= Netarhat =

- Town
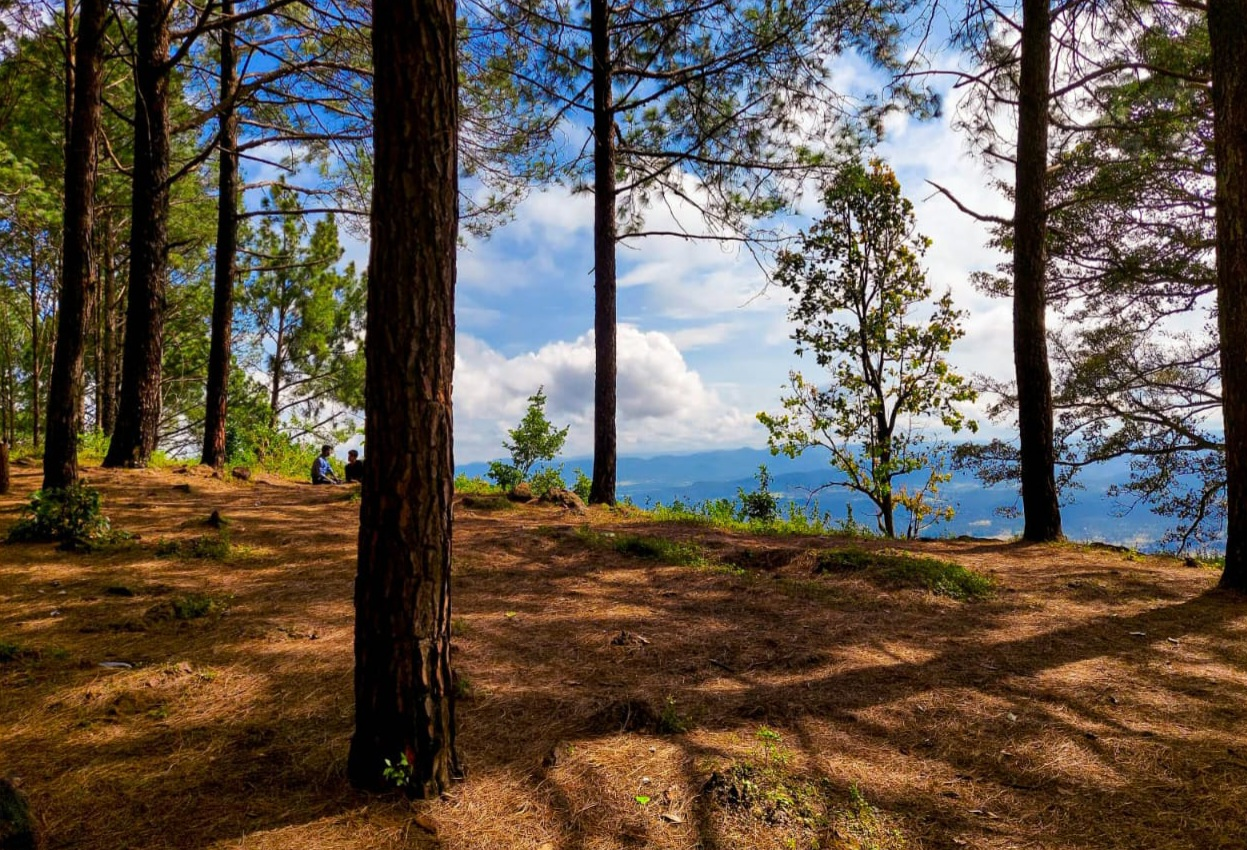
- Pine trees of Netarhat Hill station

- Location in Jharkhand, India Netarhat (India)
- Coordinates: 23°28′31″N 84°16′02″E
- Country: India
- State: Jharkhand
- District: Latehar
- Block: Mahuadanar
- Elevation: 1,128 m (3,701 ft)

Languages
  - Official: Hindi, Nagpuri, kurukh
- Time zone: UTC+5:30 (IST)
- Vehicle registration: JH-19
- Website: latehar.nic.in

Netarhat is a hill station in Latehar district in the Indian state of Jharkhand. The hill station is among the highest points of the Chotanagpur plateau. It is known for the natural beauty of hills, forest and waterfalls. It is also referred to as the "Queen of Chotanagpur".

== Geography ==
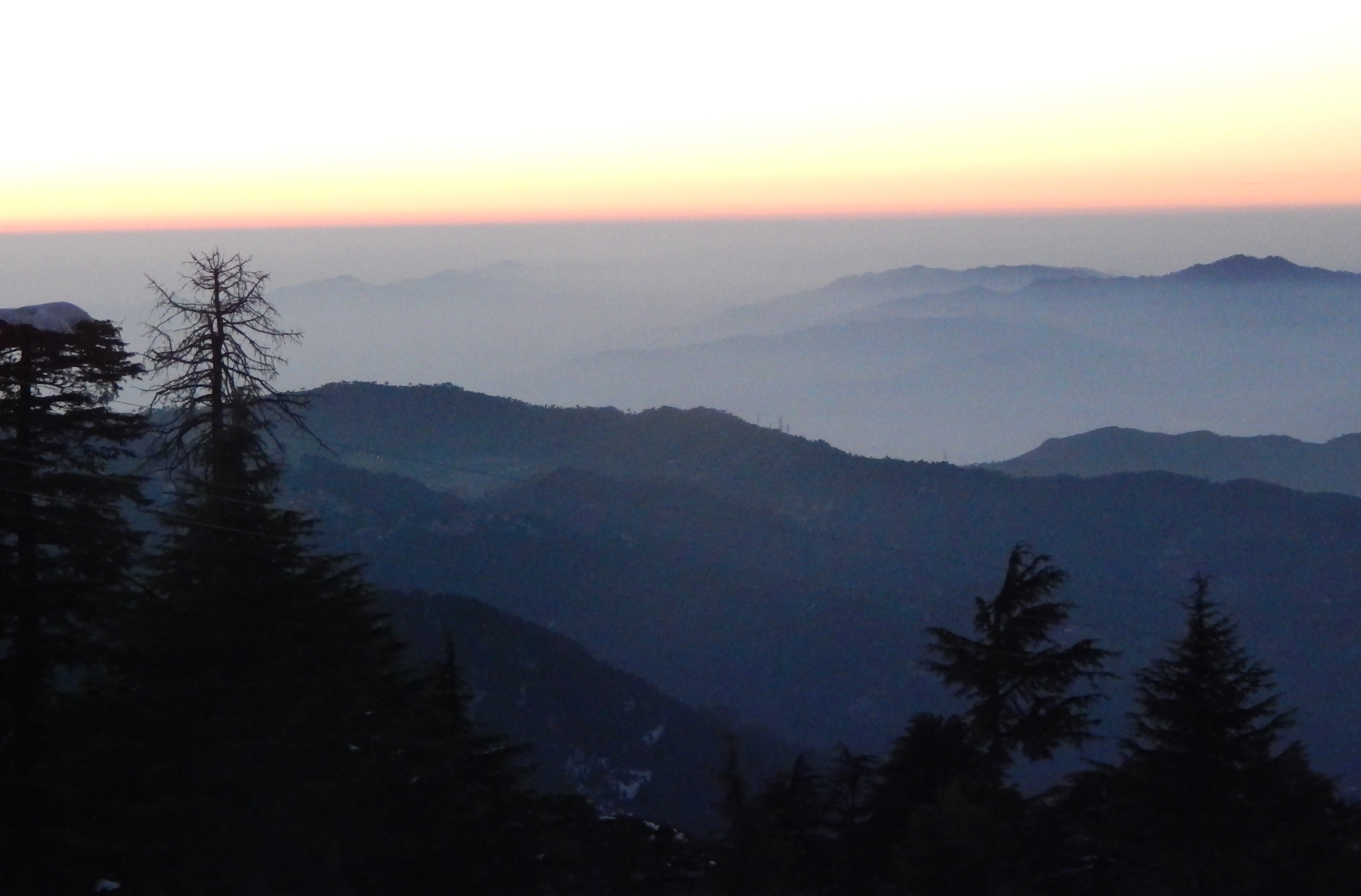
Sunset in Netarhat

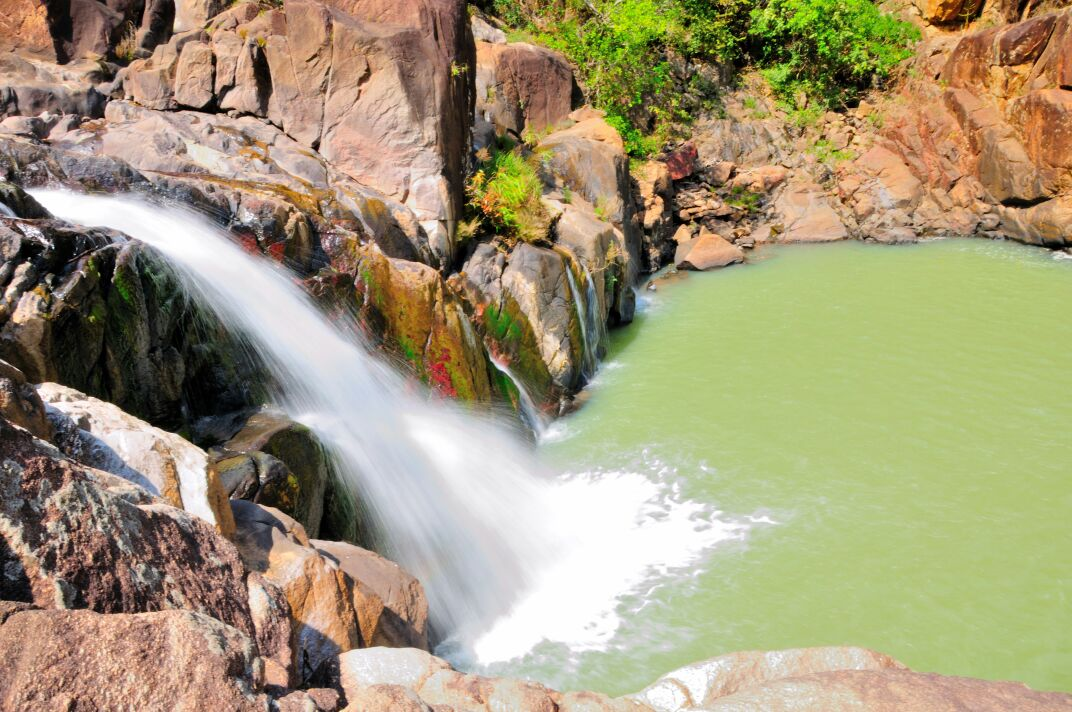
Waterfall in Netarhat

Netarhat is located at a height of 1,128 metres (3,701 ft). It is a plateau covered with thick forest. Located in the Pat region of the Chota Nagpur Plateau, Netarhat plateau is about 4 miles (6.4 km) long and 2.5 miles (4.0 km) wide. It consists of crystalline rocks and has a summit capped with sandstone, trap, or laterite. The region of Netarhat is covered with Sal, Kendu, Mahua, and Eucalyptus trees.

== Education ==
Netarhat Vidyalaya is a residential public school established in 1954.

== Tourism ==
Netarhat is known for its hills, dense forest, waterfalls. Netarhat has several places of tourist interests:

- Lodh Falls is the highest waterfall of Jharkhand and 21st highest in India. This waterfall is situated at 70 km away from Netarhat and in the forest of Sal.
- Upper Ghaghri Falls is situated 4 km away from Netarhat.
- Naina Fall
- Mahuadanr Wolf Sanctuary is the lone sanctuary in India made for the protection of wolves and mainly consists of Indian wolves.
- Magnolia Point, It is 10 km away from Netarhat and is known for its sunset.
- Sunrise Point is situated in Netarhat and known for its sunrise at mornings.
- Lower Ghaghri Falls It is situated 10 km away from Netarhat and is known for its waterfall.
- Koel river View Point is 3 km from Netarhat.
- Suga Bandh Falls is situated at 70 km away from Netarhat and is a picnic spot for locals.
- Sadni Falls is 35 km from Netarhat.
- Betla National Park is situated at 94 km away from the place and known among the first national parks in India to become a tiger reserve under Project Tiger (Palamu Tiger Reserve), 64 km away from Netarhat. It also houses two historic forts of Chero kings.
- Pear Orchards and Pine Forests are initiative of local Forest Department and they planted a lot of trees in the place.
- Lake park
- Sunrise Park
- 90° fall

== Transport ==
It is located 156 kilometres (97 mi) west of Ranchi, the state capital. It is 118 kilometres (73 mi) from Daltonganj. It is located 82 kilometres (51 mi) from district headquarter Latehar
