= Sinjo =

- Village
- Location within Jharkhand Location within India
- Coordinates: 23°51′10″N 84°21′25″E
- Country: India
- State: Jharkhand
- District: Latehar
- Block: Manika

Population
  - Total: 3,096

Languages
  - Official: Bhojpuri, Korwa
- Time zone: UTC+5:30 (IST)
- Postal code: 822126
- Vehicle registration: JH
- Website: latehar.nic.in

Map of Latehar'

Sinjo is a village of Manika Block in Latehar district, of Jharkhand, India. It is located around 120 km from Ranchi, the state capital.
