= Malhan, Latehar =

Village in Jharkhand, India

Malhan
- Village
- Location within Jharkhand Location within India
- Coordinates: 23°38′55″N 84°50′26″E
- Country: India
- State: Jharkhand
- District: Latehar

Population
  - Total: 2,649
- Time zone: UTC+5:30 (IST)
- Postal code: 829203

Malhan is a village located in Latehar, Jharkhand, India. There is both a government primary school and a secondary school in the village.
