= Lower Ghaghri Falls =

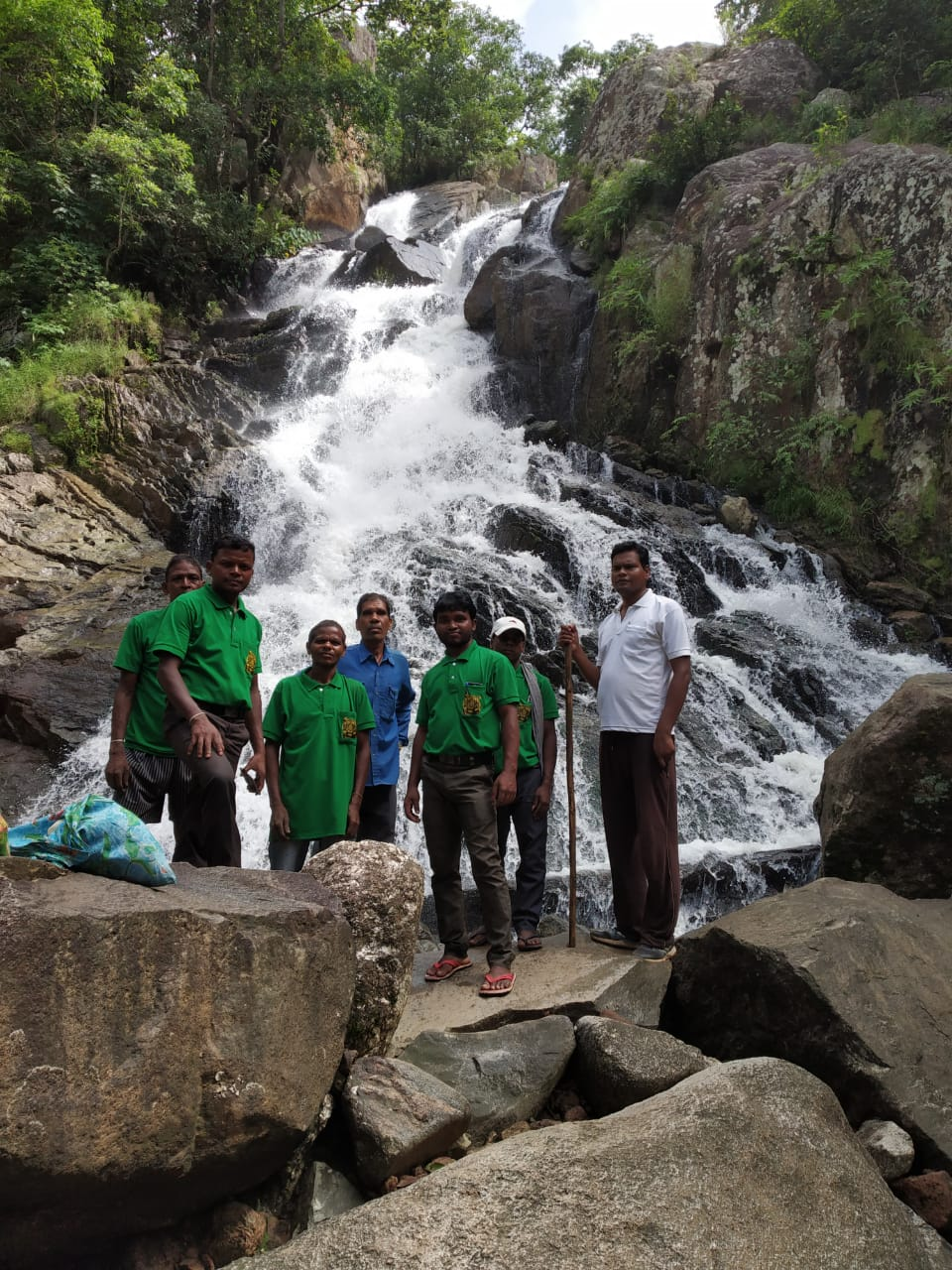
- Interactive map of Lower Ghaghri Falls
- Location: Latehar district, Jharkhand, India
- Coordinates: 23°31′54″N 84°14′45″E
- Total height: 98 metres (322 ft)
- Watercourse: Ghaghri River, a tributary of Auranga River

Lower Ghaghri Falls is located 10 kilometres (6.2 mi) from Netarhat in Latehar district in the Indian state of Jharkhand. It is the 33rd highest waterfall in India. It is known for its mesmerizing beauty and a major tourist attraction in Jharkhand.

This waterfall is situated on the Ghaghri River, tributary of Auranga River. The forest around the Lower Ghaghri Falls is so dense that even sun rays find it difficult to pierce through. The water falls from the height of 320 feet (98 m) from the cascade. The sound of falling water makes the surrounding musical. The Upper Ghaghri Falls, 4 kilometres (2.5 mi) from Netarhat, is a smaller waterfall, below Netarhat Dam.

== See also ==
- List of waterfalls
- List of waterfalls in India
- List of waterfalls in India by height
