= Sabitha Kumari =

Indian squad commander

Sabitha Kumari is the nom de guerre of a squad commander of the Communist Party of India (Maoist) in West Bengal, India.

== Early life ==
According to the West Bengal police Intelligence Bureau, she was born in the Prabira village of Jharkhand and is a science graduate from Daltonganj College.

== Political career ==
Sabitha Kumari joined the Maoists in 2000. She was earlier in charge of the Maoist guerrilla outfit in Dantewada, Chhattisgarh., and she is on the Chhattisgarh most-wanted list and several cases are registered against her, including accusations of killing police officers and political leaders and helping fellow Maoists escape from police lock-up.
