= Betla National Park =

National park in Jharkhand, India

- IUCN category II (national park)
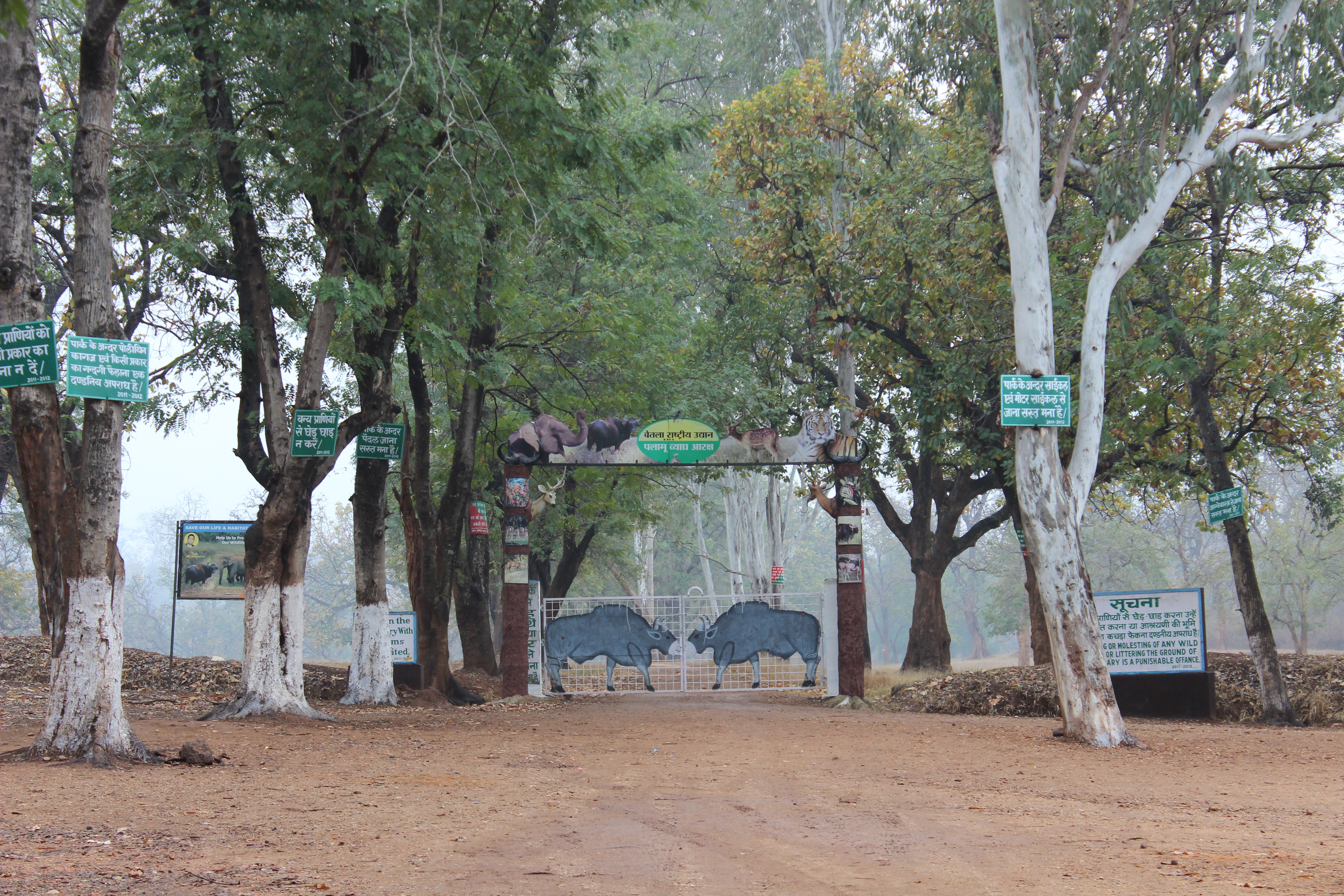
- Entrance of Betla national park

- Location within Jharkhand Location within India
- Interactive map of Betla National Park
- Location: Latehar and Palamu district, Jharkhand, India
- Nearest city: Medininagar
- Coordinates: 23°52′N 84°11′E
- Area: 226.32 km^{2} (87.38 sq mi)
- Established: 1974 (Tiger Reserve); 1986 (National Park)
- Governing body: Ministry of Environment, Forest and Climate Change, Jharkhand Forest Department
- Website: Betla National Park

Betla National Park is a national park located in the Latehar and Palamu district of Jharkhand, India. Its the only national park in the state. It is spread over an area of 226.32 km^{2} (87.38 sq mi) and is a part of the Palamu Tiger Reserve. It was declared a national park in 1986. The park hosts a wide variety of wildlife.

== Geography ==
Betla was one of the first national parks in India to become a tiger reserve under Project Tiger in 1974. It was declared a national park in 1986. It is spread over 226.32 km^{2} (87.38 sq mi) area in Palamu and Latehar district and is a part of Palamu Tiger Reserve, which comprises a total area of 1,129.93 km^{2} (436.27 sq mi). The tourist zone area is 53 km^{2} (20 sq mi) in the buffer zone. Betla is an acronym for bison, elephant, tiger, leopard and axis-axis which are found in the Park. The park is under the administration of the Forest Department.

== Flora ==
The forests of the park have a vast range of vegetation consisting of sal and bamboo as the major components along with a number of medicinal plants. The North Koel River and its tributaries flow through the northern portion of the park, producing grasslands.

== Fauna ==
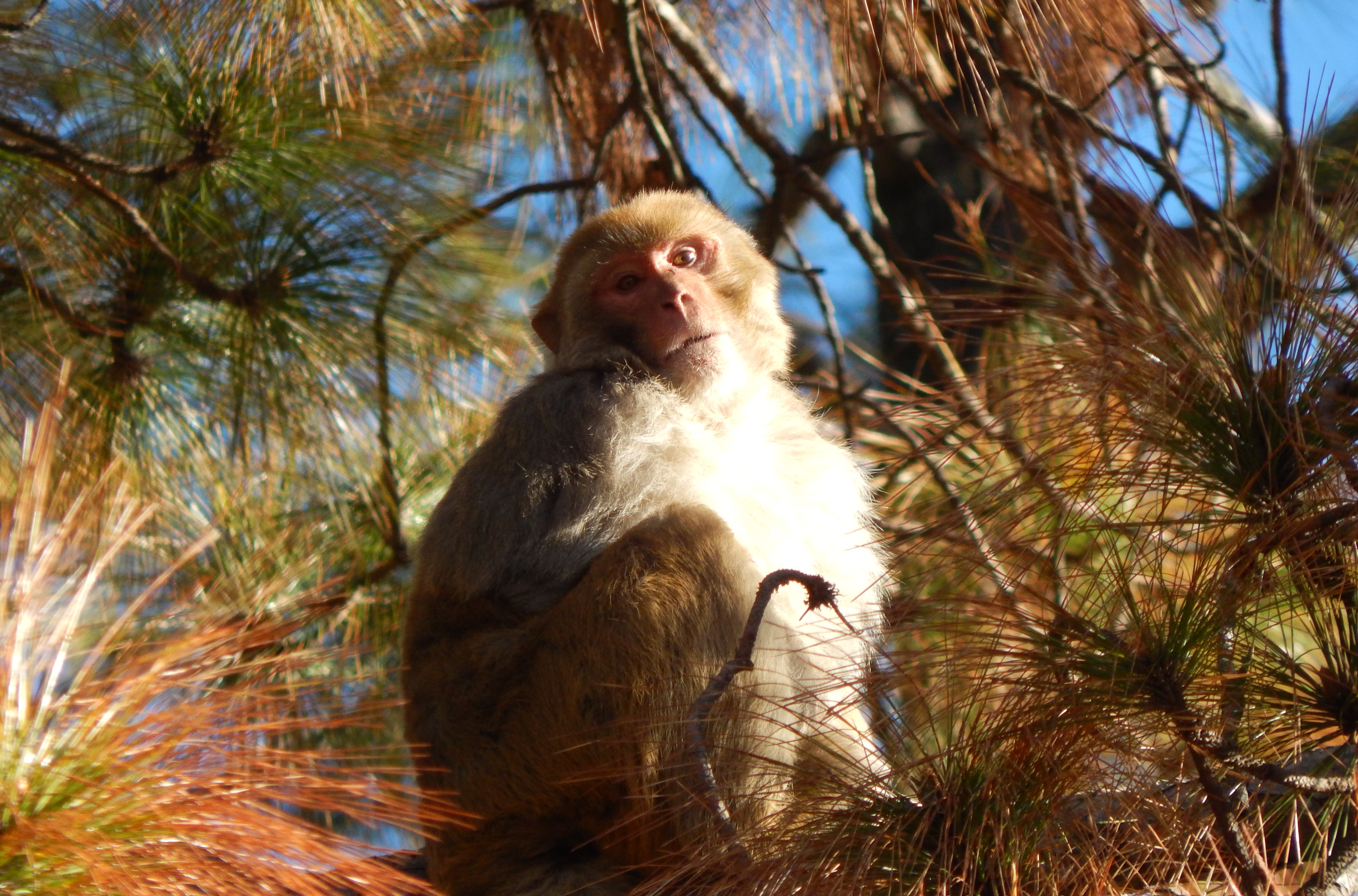
A monkey in the Betla National Park

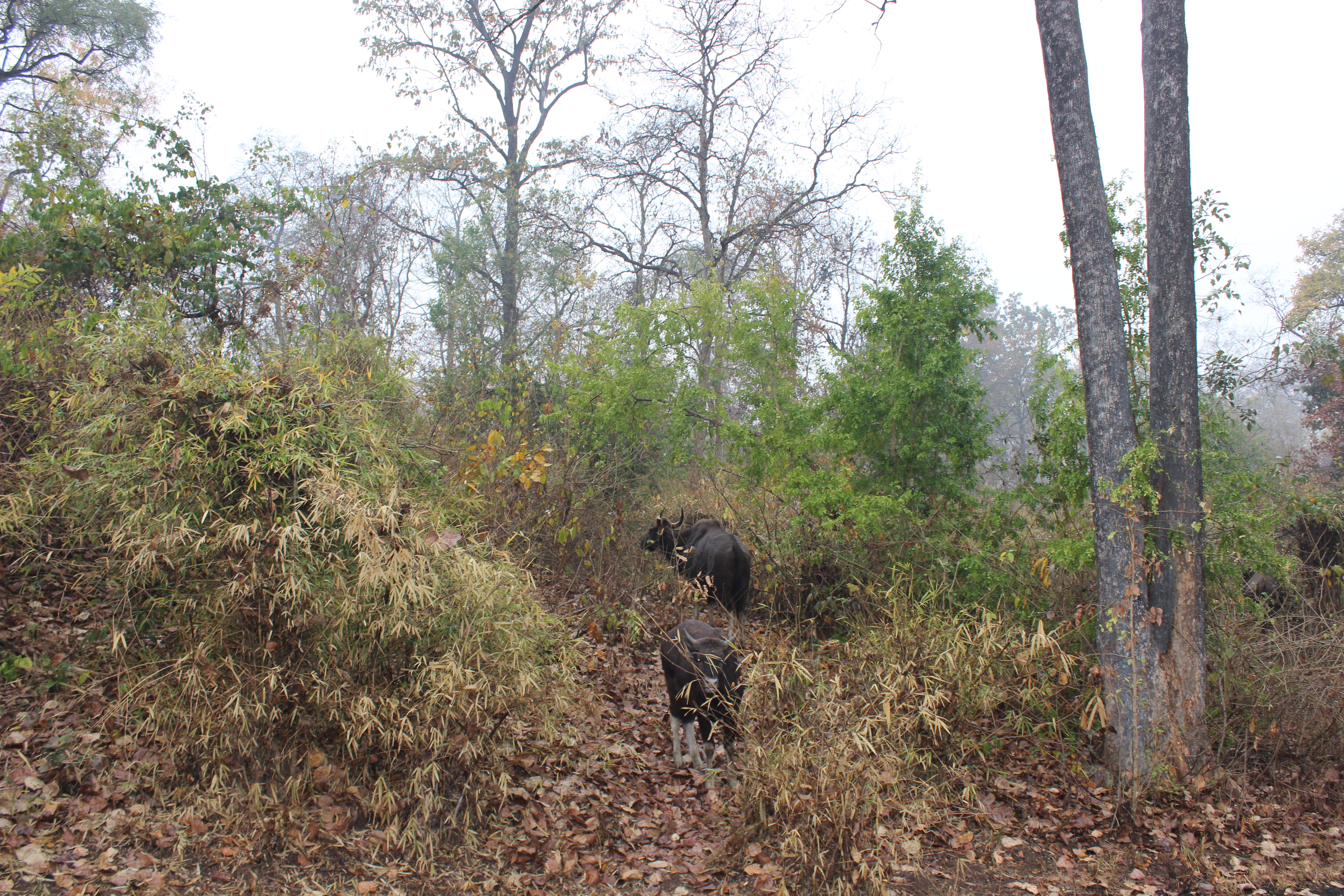
Gaur in Betla National Park

The park has a diverse ecosystems and an abundance of wild animals. The national park is home to variety of wild animals including chital, sambar, gaur, elephants, nilgai, muntjac, wild boar, jackal, wolf, leopard, tiger, hyena, sloth bear, langurs, rhesus monkeys, Indian giant squirrel, mouse deer, four-horned antelopes, small indian civet, Indian pangolin, Indian porcupine, mongoose and jungle cat.

The park hosts a variety of birds including the hornbill, peafowl, red jungle fowl, black partridge, white-necked stork, black ibis, swamphen, quail, pied hornbill, wagtail, harial, dove, drongo, crested serpent-eagle, forest owlet and papeeha.

== Other points of interest ==
- Palamu Fort, 17th century fort built by Chero Kings.

== Ecotourism ==
The park provides several opportunities to observe a variety of wildlife at close range. Jeep safaris are available with guides for venturing inside the park. Watch towers have been constructed to view the wildlife.

=== Access ===
Betla National Park is 25 km (16 mi) south from Medininagar, 65 km (40 mi) northwest from Latehar and 170 km (110 mi) northwest from Ranchi.

=== Accommodation ===
The accommodation facilities in the tourist complex include hotels, tourist lodges, log huts and tree houses inside the forest.
