= Palamau Tiger Reserve =

Tiger Reserve in Jharkhand, India

- IUCN category IV (habitat/species management area)
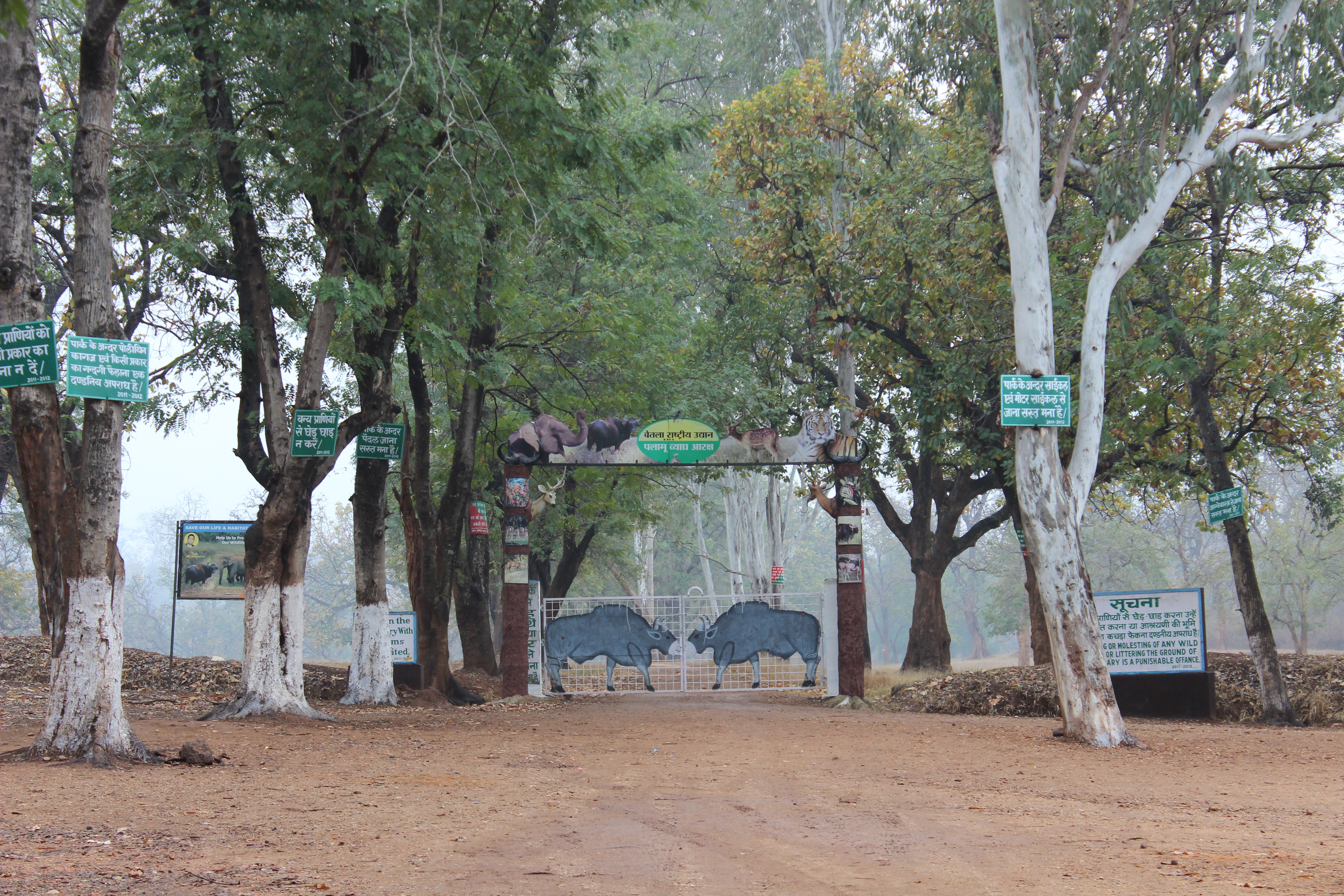
- Entrance of Betla National Park and Palamau Tiger Reserve

- Location within Jharkhand Location within India
- Interactive map of Palamau Tiger Reserve
- Location: Palamu, Latehar, Garhwa district, Jharkhand, India
- Nearest city: Medininagar
- Coordinates: 23°42′N 84°11′E
- Area: 1,129.93 km^{2} (436.27 sq mi)
- Max. elevation: 1,140 m (3,740 ft)
- Established: 1960 (Wildlife Sanctuary); 1973-74 (Tiger Reserve)
- Governing body: Ministry of Environment, Forest and Climate Change, Jharkhand Forest Department

Palamau Tiger Reserve is a tiger reserve in India and the only one in the state of Jharkhand. It covers a total area of 1,129.93 km^{2} (436.27 sq mi) in the Palamu, Latehar and Garhwa districts. It comprises the Betla National Park. It is one of the first nine tiger reserves in India declared in 1973.

== History ==
Palamu Tiger Reserve was one of the first nine Tiger Reserve of India in 1973–74. The count of wildlife in the region was done in the year of 1894–95 and 1896–97 by DME Sundar. The first tiger census carried out in the reserve based on pugmark in 1932 under supervision of Palamu divisional forest officer JW Nicholson. The area in the Palamu district was set aside as a protected area in 1947 under the Indian Forests Act. It was declared as a wildlife sanctuary in 1960. In 1973, the area was set up as the Palamu Tiger Reserve. Before the formation of the reserve, the area was used for cattle grazing and camping; it was acutely prone to forest fire.

In 2022, the reserve was reported to be largely under Naxal control. The area of Budha Pahad in the reserve was freed from Maoists in September 2022 after the special operation.

== Geography ==
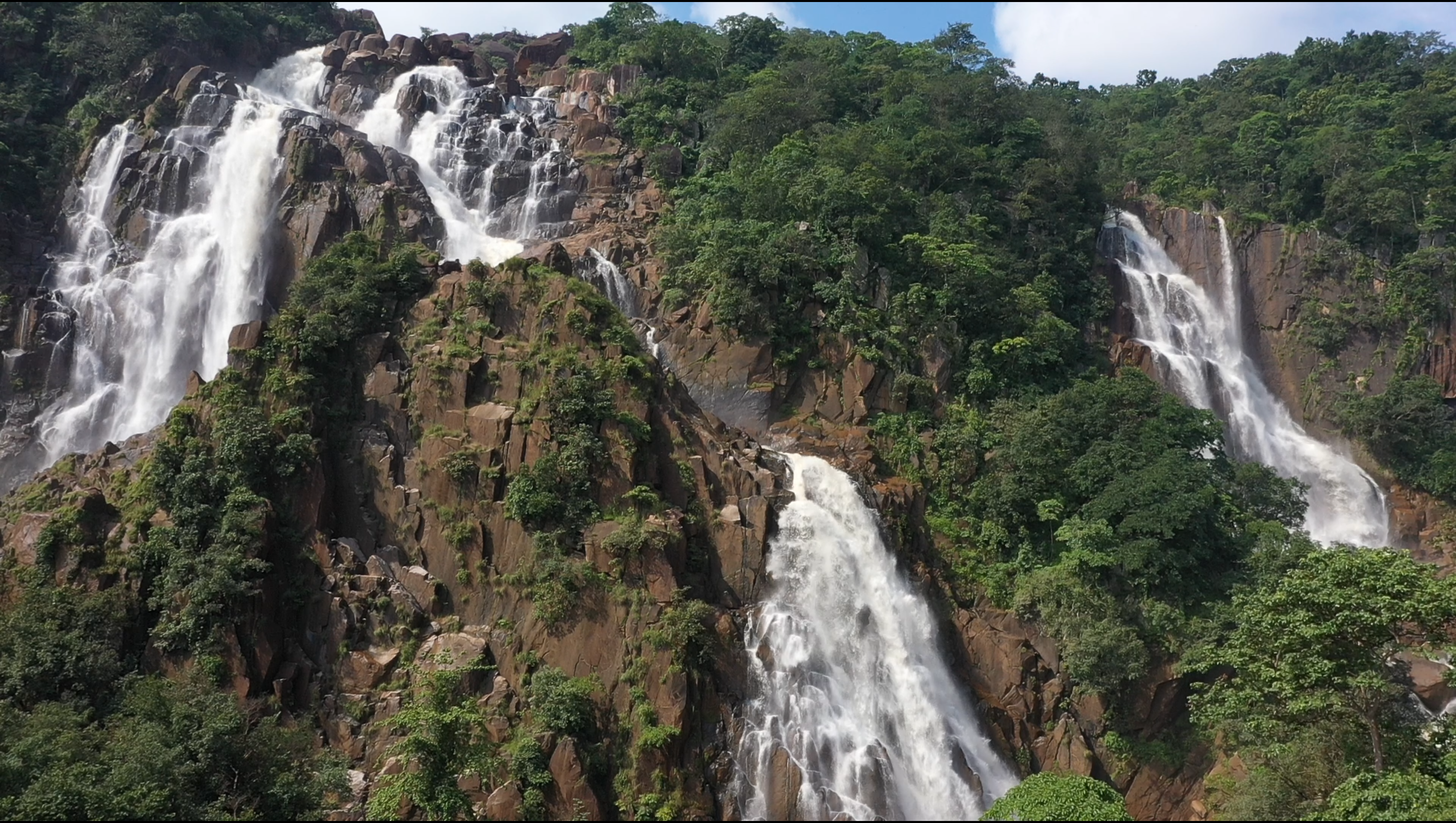
Lodh Falls, the highest waterfall in Jharkhand in Palamau Tiger Reserve

Palamau Tiger Reserve is located in the Palamu, Latehar and Garhwa district in the state of Jharkhand and has a total area of 1,129.93 km^{2} (436.27 sq mi) with a core area of 414.08 km^{2} (159.88 sq mi) and a buffer area of 715.85 km^{2} (276.39 sq mi). It comprises the 979.27 km^{2} (378.10 sq mi) area of Palamau Wildlife Sanctuary and 226.32 km^{2} (87.38 sq mi) of Betla National Park. It includes Mahuadanr Wolf Sanctuary. It is connected to Guru Ghasidas - Tamor Pingla Tiger Reserve to the west and Lawalong Wildlife Sanctuary to the east.

Ramandag, Latoo and Kujrum are forest villages in the core area. Most of the villages are small; one village, Meral, consisted in 1993 of just 99 acres (400,000 m^{2}) of land, 9 families and 78 people. Only seven of the villages were in existence in 1923. In 2023, diversion of forest land for non-forest use was approved by the Union ministry of forests, climate change and environment for the relocation of Kujrum, Latu and Jaigir villages to outside the core area.

== Flora ==
Palamu Tiger Reserve consists of deciduous forests of sal and bamboo tree. It consists of dry mixed forest, dry and moist sal forest, moist mixed forest and savannah sal forest. It has 970 species of plants, 17 species of grass and 56 species of medicinal plants.

== Fauna ==
Palamau Tiger Reserve hosts 47 mammal species and 174 bird species. Mammals include chital, sambar deer, gaur, Indian elephant, nilgai, muntjac, mouse deer, four-horned antelope, wild boar, golden jackal, dhole, Indian wolf, Indian leopard, Bengal tiger, sloth bear, striped hyena, rhesus macaque, langurs, small Indian civet, Indian pangolin, Indian porcupine, Indian grey mongoose, jungle cat and smooth-coated otter.

There are over 174 species of birds in the reserve including peafowl, red jungle fowl, Oriental pied hornbill, crested serpent-eagle, pied kingfisher, white-throated kingfisher, forest owlet, black partridge, white-necked stork, black ibis, grey-headed swamphen, quail, wagtail, dove, drongo, Asian openbill, red-wattled lapwing, Eurasian moorhen, gadwall, northern pintail, little cormorant, grey wagtail, pond heron and little ringed plover.

In 1973, 50 tigers were thought to be living in the Palamau Tiger Reserve, which came down to 38 in 2005. The 2009 tiger census based on DNA analysis indicated that there were just six tigers in the reserve. The forest department claimed that, since the core area was almost inaccessible due to difficult terrain and the Naxalite presence, the census may not have found all the tigers. The decreased game and hunting opportunities suggest that there are only six tigers in 2012. In 2018, the All India Tiger count recorded no tigers and as per the 2022 census, there was one tiger in the reserve. In January 2025, there were six tigers in the reserve.

As per 2022 census, there were 51 leopards in the reserve. As of 1989, 65 Asian elephants were thought to reside in the reserve. In 2017 census, 182 elephants were in the reserve. During the 19th century, the Asiatic lion were in the Palamu, which are now not found in the area.

== Issues ==
Increased pressure from human activities, including illegal settlement and poaching, has reduced the number of tigers and the ability of the reserve to support more tigers. There are 191 villages in and 207 on the peripheries of the reserve. Around four lakh cattle stray into the reserve in search of fodder which diminishes food for the wild animals of the reserve. The 50 km highway and 20 km railway line passes through the reserve, which creates a threat to wild animals. Several animals, including elephants, deer, bison have been killed in the past due to collision with trains. Staff shortage is a big problem as many forest guard posts are vacant due to recruitment pending since the 1990s. Monitoring, protection and conservation work is not applied in all regions of this reserve. Naxalites existence along with difficult terrain makes proper surveillance and implementation of conservation measures tough.
