= Tubed, Latehar =

Tubed, Latehar is a village in Latehar district of Jharkhand state of India.
