= Matrishri Usha Jayaswal Mega Power Plant =

- Country: India
- Location: Latehar district, Jharkhand
- Coordinates: 23°44′18″N 84°46′45″E
- Owner: Abhijeet Group

Thermal power station
- Primary fuel: Coal

Power generation
- Nameplate capacity: 1,080 MW

Matrishri Usha Jayaswal Mega Power Plant is a coal-fired power station in the state of Jharkhand, India.
