= Latehar =

- Town
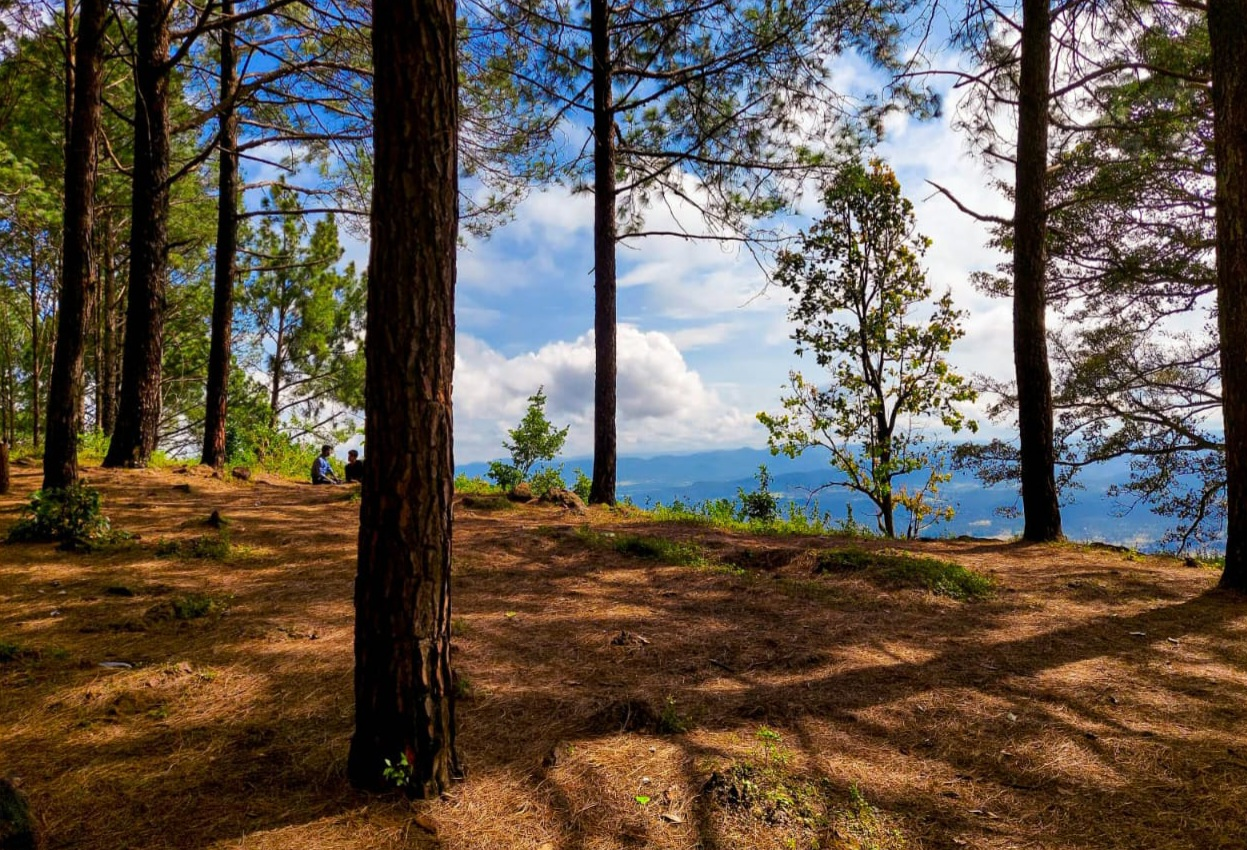
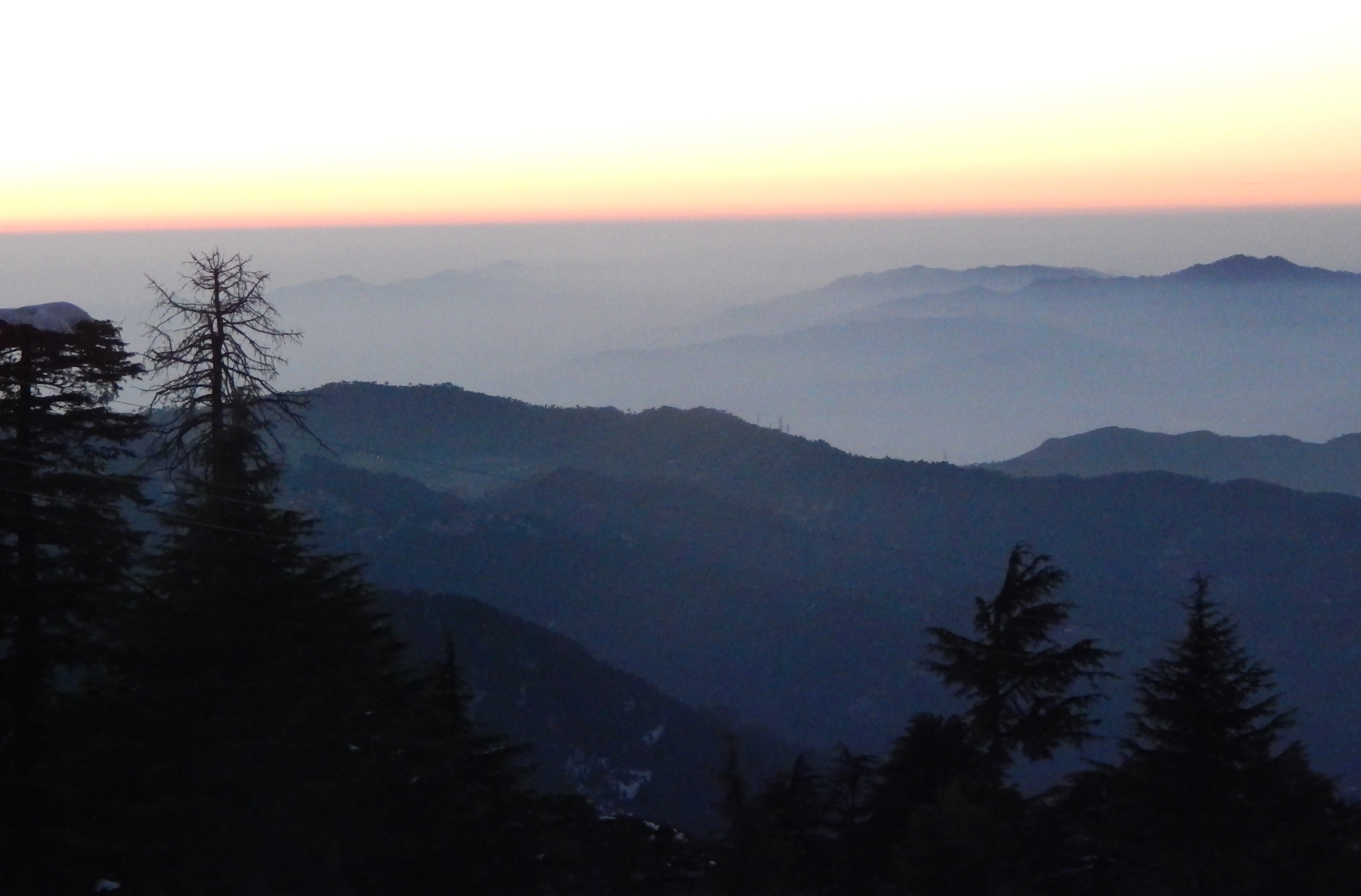
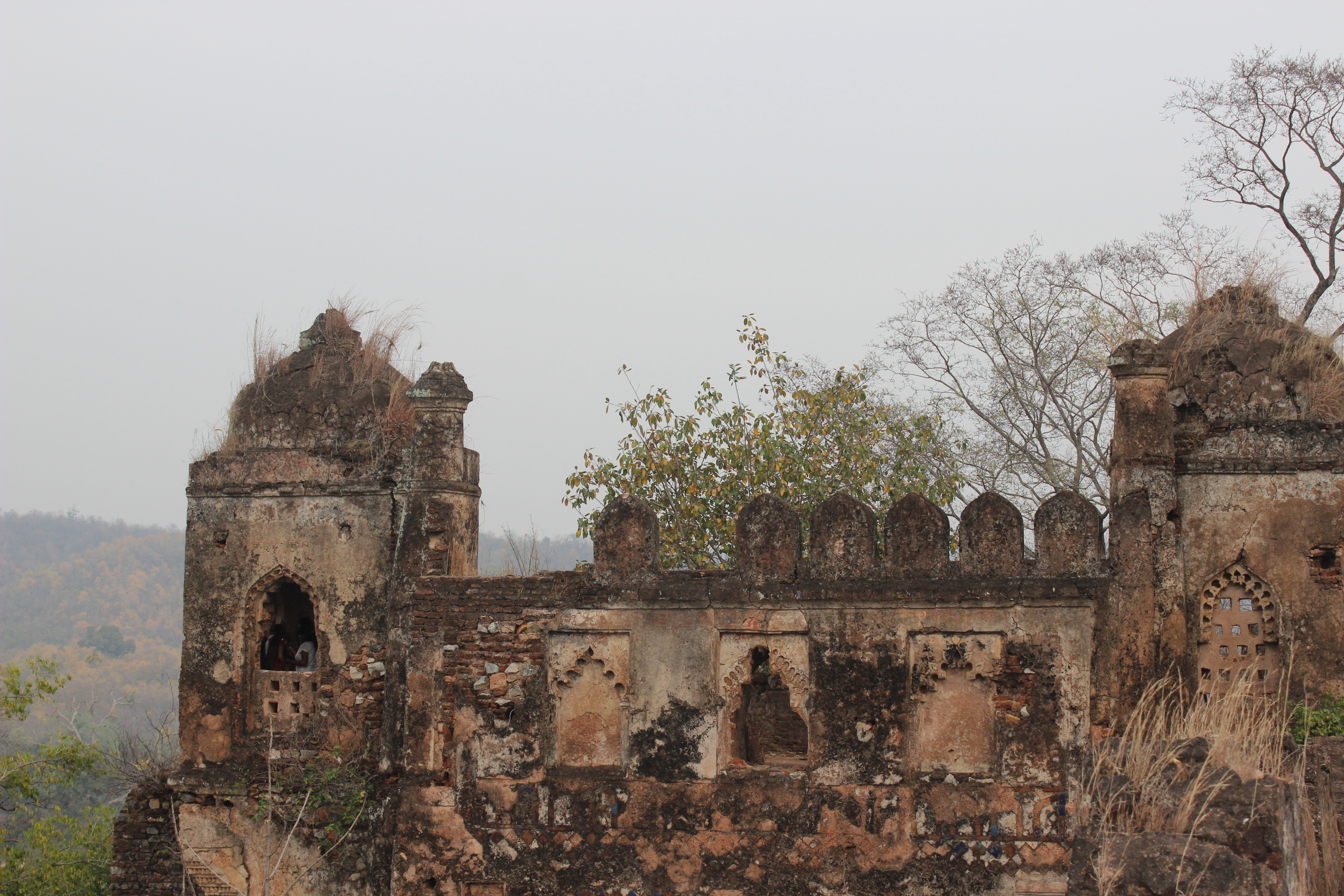
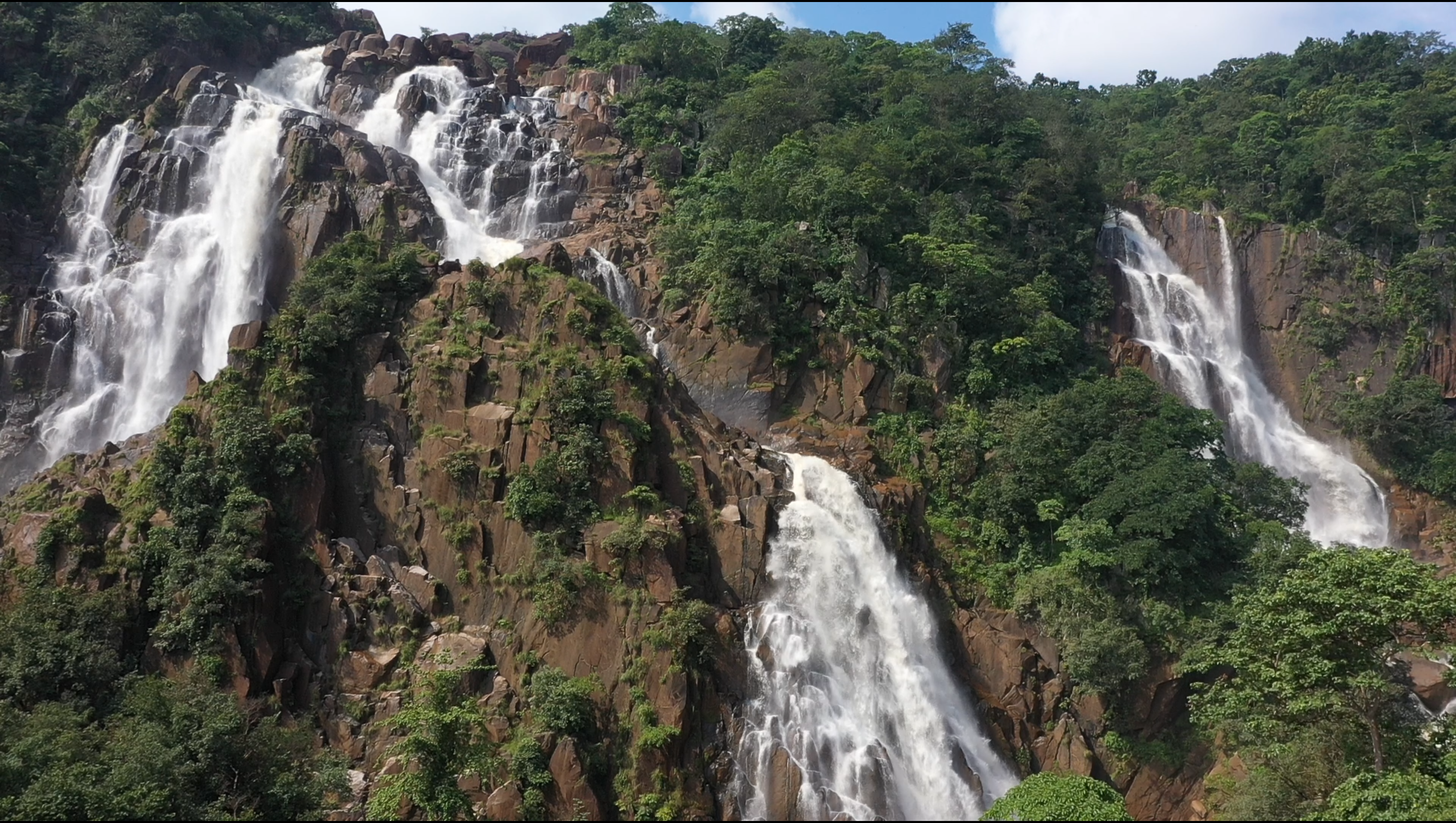
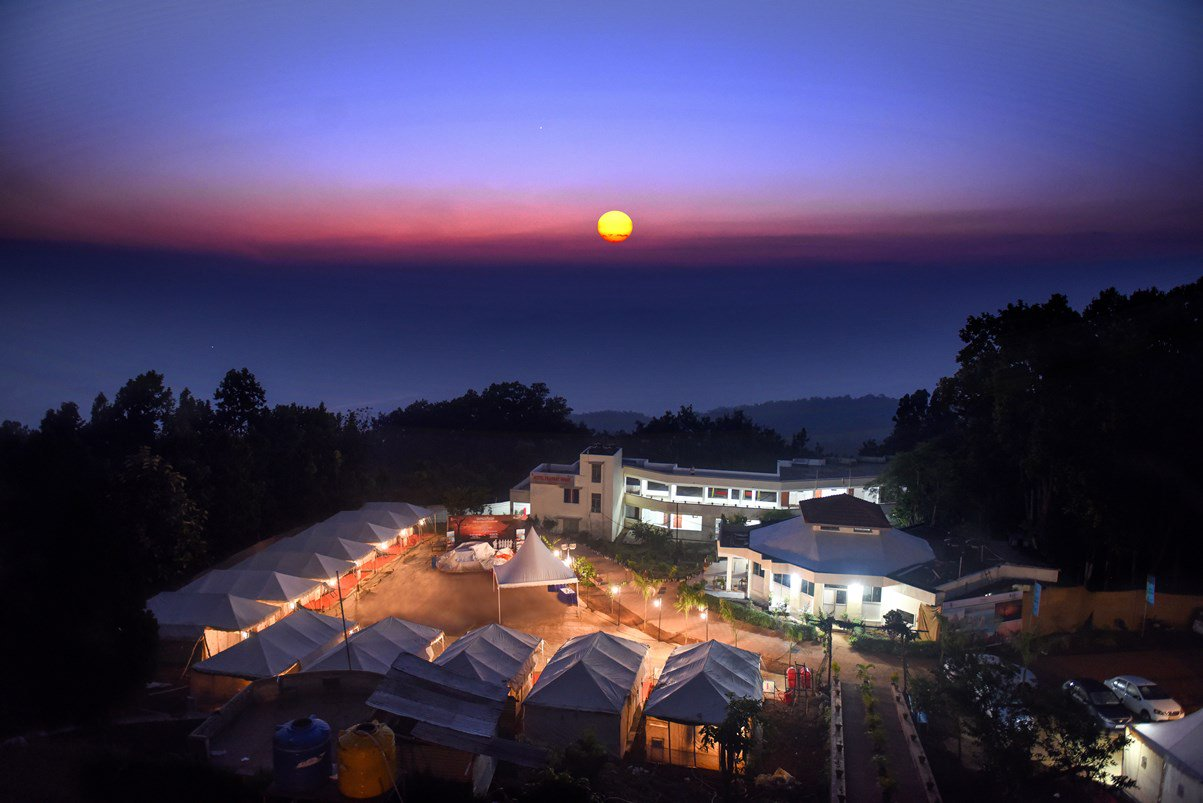
- Top to bottom: Pine trees at Netarhat, Palamu Fort, Lodh Falls, Birds-eye view of Prabhat Vihar Government guest house at Netarhat in the evening

- Location in Jharkhand, India
- Coordinates: 23°44′42.044″N 84°30′18.028″E
- Country: India
- State: Jharkhand
- District: Latehar
- Established: 4 April 2001

Government
  - Type: Municipal governance in India (town panchayat)
  - Body: Nagar Panchayat Latehar
  - MLA, Latehar (Vidhan Sabha constituency): Baidyanath Ram, Jharkhand Mukti Morcha
- Elevation: 387 m (1,270 ft)

Population (2011)
  - Total: 26,981

Languages
  - Official: Hindi
- Time zone: UTC+5:30 (IST)
- Postal code: 829206
- Vehicle registration: JH-19
- Website: latehar.nic.in

Latehar is a town in the Latehar district of Jharkhand, India. It is known for its natural environment, forest, forest products and mineral deposits.

Latehar remained a part of Palamau District as a sub division since 1924. It was elevated from sub divisional status to a district on 4 April 2001, vide Jharkhand Government Notification No 946 dated 04.04.2001. Latehar is located on the north–west corner of Jharkhand in the Palamau Commissionary. It is surrounded by Ranchi, Lohardaga, Gumla, Palamu and Chatra district apart from Chhattisgarh state. 45.54% of the population belonging to the scheduled tribes. More than 66% of total population comprises SCs and STs. The total area of the district is 3,622.50 km^{2} and one of the block headquarters is more than 200 km away from the district headquarters.

== Early history ==
The early history of Palamu is shrouded in legends and traditions. Since the district consisted mostly of forest tracts the territory seldom engaged the attention of invading armies, and the area remained outside the pale of influence of empires which were established in other parts of modern Bihar. The area was probably inhabited by autochthonous tribes in the past. The Kharwars, Oraons and Cheros, three aboriginal races ruled over this tract. Inscriptions and other relics which have been found indicate a fairly developed civilization in spite of the jungles and comparative inaccessibility of the area. The Oraons had their headquarters at Rohtas Garh in the then Shahabad district (which included the present district of Kaimur and Rohtas) and there are indications that for sometime a portion of Palamu was ruled from the headquarters of Rohtas Garh. The Cheros reigned in Palamu for nearly 200 years. This included the Chero ruler Medni Rai, who according to tradition made himself lord Paramount of the southern portion of Gaya and of large portions of Hazaribag and Surguja (in Chhattisgarh). His son, Pratap Rai built a fort at Palamu separate from the fort that had been built by his father. Prior to the domination of Palamu by the Cheros, Rakshel Rajputs held sway over the district. They, in turn, had supplanted early Marhatta settlers of whom, however, no trace is to be found now. They have probably been assimilated in the indigenous population. A factual history of Palamu, begins from the first half of the 16th century. In 1538, Sher Shah Suri had sent one of his officers to control the turbulent chiefs and free the Grand Trunk Road from their clutches who used to exploit the travellers. The Mughal influence extended to Palamu during the reign of Emperor Akbar when it was invaded by Raja Mansingh in 1574. The troops left by him were, however, driven out in 1605 when Akbar died.

In 1629, Emperor Shah Jahan appointed Ahmad Khan as the sufedar of Patna. Palamu was conferred to him as his Jagir. Ahmad Khan imposed tax to the tune of ₹ 1,36,000. The non-payment of this mandatory tax by the Chero rulers of Palamu led to three successive attacks by the Mughals. The first invasion took place in the reign of Pratap Rai. The Mughal army was led by Shaista Khan the Governor of Bihar. The army reached the fort of Palamu, defeated Pratap Rai and compelled him to pay a tax of ₹ 80,000. The second invasion was called by internal bickerings. As a result of this Pratap Rai after negotiations agreed to pay an annual tax off Rs. One lakh only On the recommendation of Itaikad Khan, successor of Shaista Khan, Emperor Shahjehan gave Palamu to him as a military chief on a jama of ₹ 2.5 lakh. Despite two invasions, the payment of tax by Chero Chiefs were never regular. As a last resort, Daud Khan, Governor of Bihar, left Patna with a strong force in 1660 and in spite of heavy drawbacks and difficult terrain, reached within 3 km of Palamu. There was an engagement and fighting which lasted three days, after which the fort was captured. Palamu was then placed in charge of Muhammadan Faujdar. But this system was done away soon and Palamu was placed under the direct control of the Viceroy of Bihar in 1660. Palamu was again invaded by Subedar Sarballand Khan. But actual fighting was warded off by the payment of one lakh of rupees in cash and in the shape of diamonds.

== Geography ==
Latehar lies at 23.75°N 84.50°E. It has an average elevation of 387 m (1,270 ft).

== Demographics ==
As of 2011 India census, Latehar town had a population of 26,981.

== Economy ==
The economy of the people revolves round the forest produces, agriculture and minerals. Rice, fruits, maize, wheat, etc. are the major crops grown here.

Magadh Amrapali coal mines of Central Coalfield Ltd between Latehar & Chatra districts is the largest coal mine of Asia. It has many operational coal mines in Latehar. Jharkhand State Mineral Development Corporation (JSMDC) also has a coal mining project at Sikni. Hindalco Industries has a bauxite mine at Kukutpat.

Chandwa has a thermal power project, Matrishri Usha Jayaswal Thermal Power Plant, a coal-fired power plant of 1080 MW established by Corporate Power Ltd, a unit of Abhijeet Groups.

Essar Power Ltd has a thermal power plant of 1800MW at Tori.

== Tourist Attractions ==
=== Betla National Park ===
Situated in the district of Latehar, 8 km away from Barwadih, it is spread over an area of 979 sq km. The core area of 232 km^{2} of the sanctuary was declared as Betla National Park in September 1989. The park occupies the western parts of the Chota Nagpur Plateau and was constituted in 1960 as an extension of the Hazaribagh National Park. Barwadih has the distinction of being the forest where the world's first tiger census was enumerated in 1932. The park became one of the earliest 9 tiger reserves in India under 'Project Tiger' in 1974.

The forests of the park have a range of vegetation consisting of tropical wet evergreen forests in the lower reaches, mixed (moist and dry) deciduous forests in the middle and temperate alpine forests in the upper reaches including sal and bamboo as the major components along with a number of medicinal plants. The river Koel and its tributaries run through the northern portion of the park. There are grasslands in the river flowing area. It also has waterfalls and hot springs. Once the seat of Chero kings, there are two historical forts, one of them from the 16th century, deep inside the forest. The main sentinel of the old fort is visible high up on the hill with defences in three directions and three main gates.

=== Adventure Tourism ===
Tourist places

- 1) Netarhat Sunrise Point
- 2) Netarhat Sunset Point
- 3) Lodh waterfalls
- 4) Upper Ghaghri Waterfall
- 5) Lower Ghaghri Waterfall
- 6) Sugha Bandh waterfall
- 7) Mirchiya waterfall
- 8) Indra waterfall
- 9) Betla National Park
- 10) Cave of tubed
- 11) Palamu Fort
- 12) Nagar temple
- 13) Vaishno Durga Mandir
- 14) Tattha pani
- 15) Netarhat school
- 16) Tappa Hill
- 17) Tree House Betla
- 18) Netarhat Dam
- 19) Lalmatiya Dam
- 20) Jhariya Dam
- 21) Maa Vaishno Temple
- 22) Jagraha Dam Chandwa
- 23) Datam Patam Waterfall Balumath
- 24) Dumohan Chandwa
- 25) Boda Pahar Chandwa
- 26) Chullah Pani Boda Pahar Chandwa
- 27) Chatuag Chnadwa.

== Schools ==
Schools and colleges:

- St. Joseph-2 School
- Latehar Public School
- Latehar College

== See also ==
- Latehar district
- Medininagar
