= Netarhat Awasiya Vidyalaya =

Netarhat Residential School
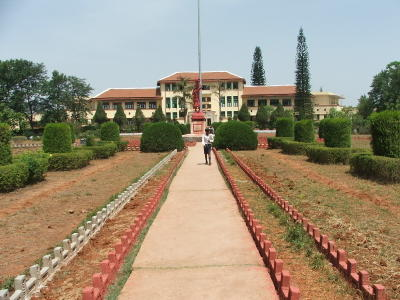
- Building, Netarhat School

Location
- Netarhat, Jharkhand, India; 23°28′23″N 84°15′44″E

Information
- Type: Public
- Motto: "Atta Dipa Viharatha" – be the own light'
- Established: 15 November 1954 (71 years ago)
- Principal: Santosh kumar
- Grades: Classes VI – XII
- Area: 780 acres (320 ha)
- Website: Official website

Netarhat Residential School is a school in Netarhat, India. Students participate in the Regional Mathematics Olympiad and National Talent Search Examination (NTSE) conducted by the National Council of Educational Research and Training (NCERT). Students also participate in inter-house and inter-set competitions and inter-school competitions. Santosh kumar is the present principal of Netarhat Residential School.

== History ==
Netarhat Residential School was established on 15 November 1954, after the independence of India for the people of state of Bihar. It was a dream of the first chief minister of Bihar, Shri Krishna Singh and his deputy chief minister and finance minister Anugrah Narayan Sinha to establish a centre of excellence. The educationist Frederick Gordon Pearce, Jagadish Chandra Mather and Sachidanand Sinha played a vital role in making the plans for the school (or Netarhat Vidyalaya). Pearce has received kudos from Rajendra Prasad, then the president of India for his works.

== Alumni ==
The alumni association is known as NOBA – Netarhat Old boys Association. There are chapters of NOBA, and the members meet regularly.

== Ambience ==
The school is situated far away from the busy life of town, on the plateau of Chhotanagpur, in the state of Jharkhand in India. The whole atmosphere is based on Gurukul – away from home, staying in Ashrams, simple and country-made dress based on the Gandhian philosophy.

The guiding philosophy can be summarized by the following shloka in Sanskrit etched at the entrance of the main building of the school.
ना त्वहम् कामये राज्यम् ना स्वर्गम् ना पुनर्भवम् |
कामये दुःखतप्ताणाम् प्राणीणामार्त्ति नाशनाम् ||
(Oh Lord, I desire not kingdom nor the heavens nor even moksha. All I desire is to remove the suffering from the afflicted beings.)

== Location ==
Netarhat (23°28'48"N 84°16'11"E) is located at an elevation of 1250 meters and is renowned for spectacular sunrises, sunsets, waterfalls, and beautiful flora and fauna. The nearest major railway station and airport is Ranchi, which is 156 kilometers away. There are buses for Netarhat from Ranchi and Palamau.

Tourists from all over India and abroad visit Netarhat, whose name means Nature's Heart.

== Admission and curriculum ==
Admission to the school, which is run by the government of Jharkhand (since inception it was run by the government of Bihar until the separation of the states) is given on the basis of three stages of examination: descriptive and multiple-choice written tests, psychological tests and personal interview. Boys between 10 and 12 years of age who are living in the state can apply for admission on a prescribed form through Sub-divisional Education Officers. As many as 20,000+ students used to vie for 100 seats (60 till the year 1982) just before the separation of the state of Bihar. Seats are reserved for the students belonging to the scheduled castes, scheduled tribes and other classes as defined by the state government.

Students are provided education up to 10+2 level. The medium of instruction is English and the curriculum is based on the standards set by the Central Board of Secondary Education. For the students of first three years (Class VII to IX) the school has developed its own curriculum with provision for compulsory training in Music, Fine Arts, Agriculture and Crafts. Computer studies have been introduced to the school.

== Administration and staff ==
The school has now been given the autonomous status and been named as Netarhat Vidyalaya Samiti under the control of Ministry of HRD, Govt. of Jharkahnd. The principal is the member secretary of the executive committee. As it is a government institution, its entire administrative system is governed and controlled by government rules and regulations.

All the teachers who are Gazetted Government servants have been entrusted academic and administrative control. The principal is overall controlling officer.

A few teachers of the past and present have been awarded by the president of India.

Name	From	To
Charles James Nepier	Apr 1954	Aug 1955
Radha Sinha	Sep 1955	Mar 1956
Jeevannath Dar	Apr 1956	Dec 1966
Birendra Kumar Sinha	Jan 1967	Feb 1976
Ramdev Tripathi	Feb 1976	Feb 1979
Kailash Narayan Mehrotra	Jun 1979	Oct 1980
Mithilesh Kanti	Oct 1980	Sep 1983
Dwarika Prasad Singh	Sep 1983	Apr 1986
Satya Narayan Singh	Nov 1986	Apr 1988
Mangal Dev Pandey	Aug 1988	Apr 1990
Param Mitra Sashtri	Apr 1990	Sep 1991
K.N. Vasudevan	Aug 1991	Sep 1995
Kamleshwar Prasad	Oct 1995	Sep 2000
Narendra Prasad	Sep 2000	Aug 2003
Binod Kumar Karn	Sep 2003	Jan 2010
Ramakant Gajanan Marathe	Feb 2010	Nov 2010
Ram Naresh Singh	Dec 2010	Sep 2013
Bimalanshu Shekhar Mallik	Oct 2013	Dec 2015
Ram Naresh Singh	Dec 2015	Mar 2016
Bindhyachal Pandey	Mar 2016	Jan 2018
Anjani Kumar Pathak	08.01.2018	June 2018
Santosh Kumar Singh	June 2018	June 2023
Prasad Paswan	June 2023	March 2024
Abhishek Mishra	April 2024	June 2024
Santosh Kumar Pathak	June 2024	Till Date

== Co-curricular activities ==
Games, sports and physical training form a part of the routine at the Netarhat School. The school has senior division Naval wing besides the three junior divisions of N.C.C.National Cadet Corps (India) – Army, Air and Naval. There are four Scout troops for junior boys and they can also opt for the Red Cross Society. Training in yoga and gymnastics is also imparted to the boys and girls. Athletics and cross-country competitions are held besides sports tournaments.

The school has facilities for playing games like football, hockey, volleyball, tennis, basketball, cricket, badminton, table tennis, kho kho, kabaddi, carrom, and chess. Annual tournaments are held for most of these games and students also participate in inter-school tournaments.

The school has facilities for hobbies like wood-work, metal-work, aeromodelling, claymodelling, gardening, photography, painting and rifle training. Dramas in Hindi and English, debates, elocution and antyakshri(अन्त्याक्षरी) competitions are held. Some students participated in the six-week-long camp held on the plateau by National School of Drama. The picturesque locale has also attracted the directors of movies including the Hindi movie Hip Hip Hurray.

Educational tours are organised by the school.

Societies of students have been formed to prepare for events such as Independence Day, Republic Day, Annual Day, Gandhi Jayanti, Tulsi Jayanti, Saraswati Puja etc.

== Fees ==
Fees are charged according to the income of the guardians. Poor but meritorious students are imparted free education. Clothes, books and other necessary stuff are also provided by the school. Food and lodging are subsidised for every student.

== Hostels ==
All the students live in hostels which are called Ashrams. Every Ashram is headed by an Ashramadhyaksha or housemaster who is a teacher. All the teachers are addressed as Shriman ji. The housemasters and their wives, who are called Mataji (Mother), live in the Ashrams and have their meals with the boarders. Meals are prepared under the supervision of Mataji.

Seniors are addressed with ji suffixed to their names which is common way of showing respect in India among the Hindi speaking population. This tradition continues even after the students pass out of the school.

The Ashram chores are done by the inmates. The boarders follow a routine with provisions for swadhyaya(self-study), rest, P.T., games and sports, daily chores, television, group activities etc. A senior student is appointed as a prefect for the Ashram, as well as a couple of other senior prefects.

The barbers, cobblers, tailors and washermen are available on campus and the cost is borne by the school itself. There is a sick-room with a full-time medical officer.

The students are not allowed to wear any clothes or accessories other than those provided by the school to ensure uniformity.

Hostels are grouped into seven sets or ashram – wargas for purpose of administration and competition.

Set (Ashramvarga)	Houses (Ashrams)
1st Set	Arun, Shanti, Gautam
2nd Set	Anand, Prem, Arjun
3rd Set	Ashok, Kishore, Saket
4th Set	Nalanda, Vikram, Taxila
5th Set	Bhabha, Raman, Bose
6th Set	Arvind, Ramkrishna, Pradeep
7th Set	Kanva, Kapil, Kanad
