= Ladigarh =

Village in Jharkhand, India

Ladigarh is a village 7 km (4.3 mi) from Daltonganj in the Indian state of Jharkhand.
