= Auranga River (Jharkhand) =

- Location of the river mouth Auranga River (Jharkhand) (India)

Location
- Country: India
- State: Jharkhand

Physical characteristics
- Source
  - location: Chulha Pani, Lohardaga Jharkhand
  - coordinates: 23°36′52″N 84°40′23″E
  - elevation: 921m
- Mouth: North Koel River
  - location: Kechki
  - coordinates: 23°56′42″N 84°08′28″E
  - elevation: 247m
- Length: 95 km (59 mi)

Basin features
- Tributaries
  - left: Lawapani waterfall
  - right: Nunforwa waterfall, Tatapani hot water spring, jaram sukri

The Auranga River originates at Chulha Pani on the border of Lohardega & Latehar district of Jharkhand. On its left River Damodar also originates from same point. River Auranga flows through the Richughutu, Latehar railway station and Palamu districts in the Indian state of Jharkhand.

== Course ==
The Auranga originates near Chulhapani, Lohardega. It descends from the Ranchi plateau and pursues a winding course in a north-westerly direction for a distance of about 95 kilometres (59 mi), till it flows into the Koel near Kechki, Which is called as Kechki Sangam a Popular Tourist destination 16 kilometres (10 mi) south of Daltonganj.

It passes through a large valley, the southern face of which is formed by the Kumandih hills. Its bed widens rapidly and by the time it reaches the Palamu Fort it has attained a considerable size. Where the ruins of these two forts overlook it, the channel is crowded with huge masses of gneiss. Owing to its rocky bed, navigation is impossible in the rains, and at other times the supply of water is insufficient for even the smallest craft

It is a major tributary of North Koel river, which brings a lot of red and muddy water during monsoon season Also the river water is so clean and pure during winter season .

=== Tributaries ===
Its principal tributaries are Lawapani Waterfall, Nunfoorwa waterfall in sukri, Tatapani hot spring in jaram. Also There are many tributaries other than which is mention above that are small channel of water from Mountain which joined the river .
