= Garu Block =

Garu Block is one of the administrative blocks of Latehar district, Jharkhand state, India.
