= Mahuadanr Wolf Sanctuary =

Wildlife sanctuary in India

- IUCN category IV (habitat/species management area)
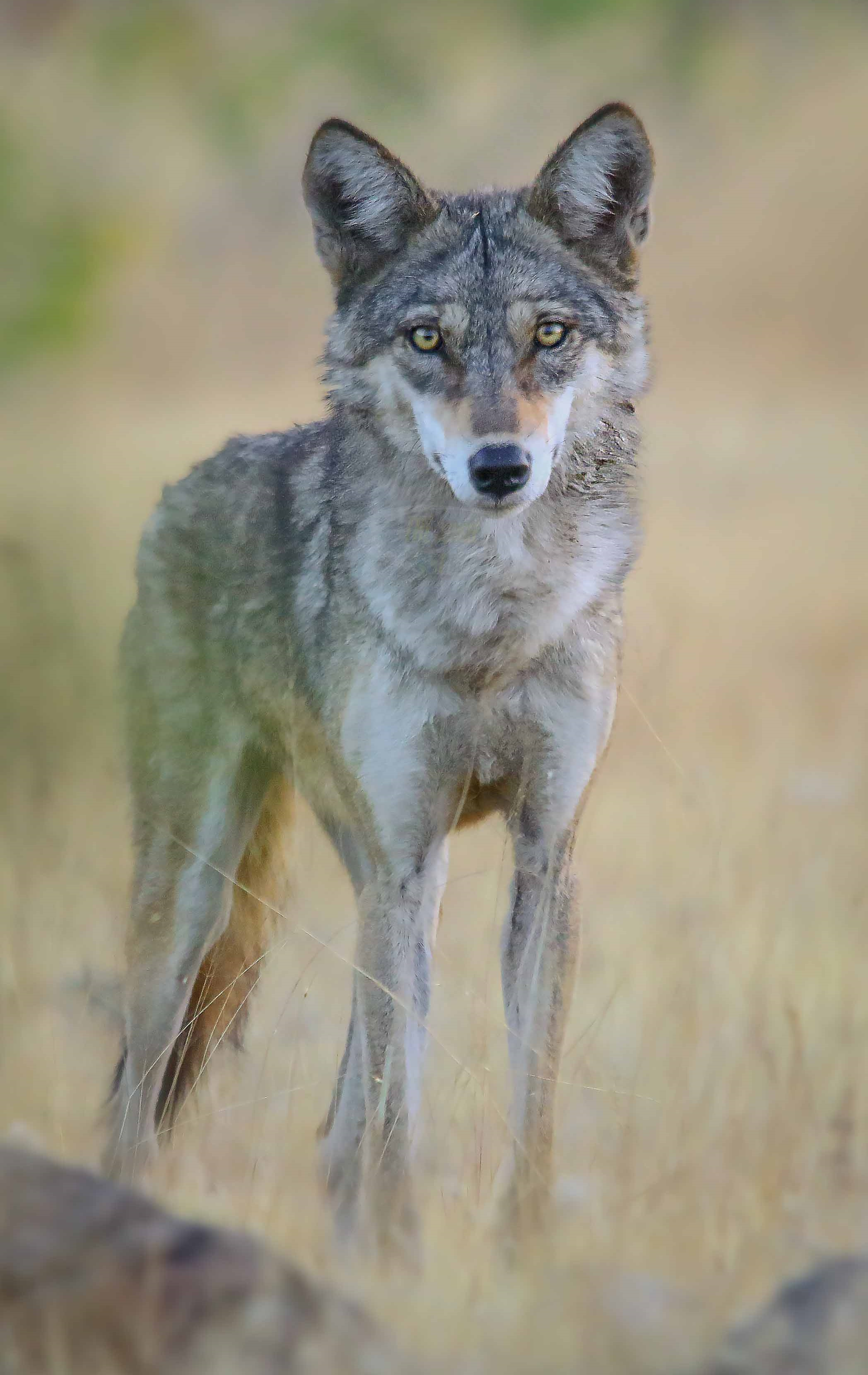
- Indian wolf (Canis lupus pallipes)

- Location within Jharkhand Location within India
- Interactive map of Mahuadanr Wolf Sanctuary
- Location: Latehar district, Jharkhand, India
- Coordinates: 23°27′N 84°02′E
- Area: 63.25 km^{2} (24.42 sq mi)
- Established: 1976
- Governing body: Department of Environment, Forest and Climate Change, Government of Jharkhand
- Website: forest.jharkhand.gov.in/wildlife/mahuadand.aspx

Mahuadanr Wolf Sanctuary is a wildlife sanctuary located in Latehar district of Jharkhand. It is part of Palamau Tiger Reserve. It was declared to be a wildlife sanctuary in 1976 for the protection of the Indian wolf. Its the only wildlife sanctuary in India dedicated exclusively to the Indian wolf.

== Geography ==
Mahuadanr Wolf Sanctuary is located in Latehar district of Jharkhand. In 1976, the sanctuary was declared a wolf sanctuary for the protection of the Indian wolf (Canis lupus pallipes) population. It is part of Palamau Tiger Reserve. It is spread over approx. 63 square kilometres.

== Wildlife ==
The sanctuary is home to many species of wild animals including chital, wild boar, striped hyena, sloth bear and Indian wolf. There are large numbers of wolf dens in the park, where the packs nest and rear their young, and where males court females during the breeding season, between November and February. According to the first count in 1979, there were 49 wolves in the sanctuary. In 2009, there were 58 wolves counted in the sanctuary. There were 120 wolves in 2020. According to survey of wild life Institute in 2024, there were four packs and 70 wolves in the sanctuary.
