= Manika Block =

Manika
- Community development block
- Location within Jharkhand Location within India
- Coordinates: 23.86°N 84.36°E
- Country: India
- State: Jharkhand
- District: Latehar

Languages
  - Official: Hindi
- Time zone: UTC+5:30 (IST)
- Postal code: 822126
- Vehicle registration: JH
- Website: latehar.nic.in

Manika, is a community development blocks in Latehar district, in Indian state of Jharkhand. It is located around 131 km from Ranchi, the state capital.
