= Medininagar =

- City
- Location of Medininagar in Jharkhand
- Coordinates: 24.03°N 84.07°E
- India: India
- State: Jharkhand
- Division: Palamu
- District: Palamu
- Established: 1880
- Founder: Edward Tuite Dalton
- Named for: Maharaja Medini Ray

Government
  - Type: Municipal Corporation
  - Body: Medininagar Municipal Corporation
  - Mayor: Aruna Shankar (BJP)
  - Deputy mayor: Mangal Singh (BJP)
  - Municipal Commissioner: Jawed Hussain (IAS)

Area
  - Total: 150 km^{2} (58 sq mi)
  - Rank: 5th in Jharkhand
- Elevation: 215 m (705 ft)

Population (2011)
  - Total: 158,941
  - Rank: 10th in Jharkhand
  - Density: 1,100/km^{2} (2,700/sq mi)

Languages-
  - Official: Hindi, English
- Time zone: UTC+5:30 (IST)
- PIN: 822101
- telephone: 06562
- Vehicle registration: JH-03
- Literacy: 87.29%
- Website: www.palamu.nic.in

Medininagar, formerly Daltonganj, is a city and municipal corporation in Palamu district in the Indian state of Jharkhand. It is also the administrative headquarter of Palamu district and divisional headquarters of Palamu division, as well as the subdivision and block of the same name. The city is situated on the banks of the North Koel River. It is the main city in north-western part of Jharkhand.

== Origin of name ==
The city was named Daltonganj during the British Raj after Irishman Colonel Edward Tuite Dalton (1815–1880), an anthropologist and the commissioner of Chota Nagpur in 1861. The name was changed to Medininagar in 2004 by the state government of Jharkhand, after Raja Medini Ray of the Chero dynasty. The former name is still retained in the name of the city's railway station. It is administered by the Medininagar Municipal Corporation, which was formed on 30 May 2015.

== Geography ==
Medininagar is located at 24.03°N 84.07°E. It has an average elevation of 215 m (705 ft).

The Betla National Park is located about 20 km from the city. This park is known for tigers, and comes under the Palamau Tiger Project. Another picnic spot nearby is Kechki, located about 18 km from Medininagar, at the confluence of the Koel River and the Auranga River. Netarhat, a plateau covered with thick forests, is also situated near Medininagar.

== Transport ==
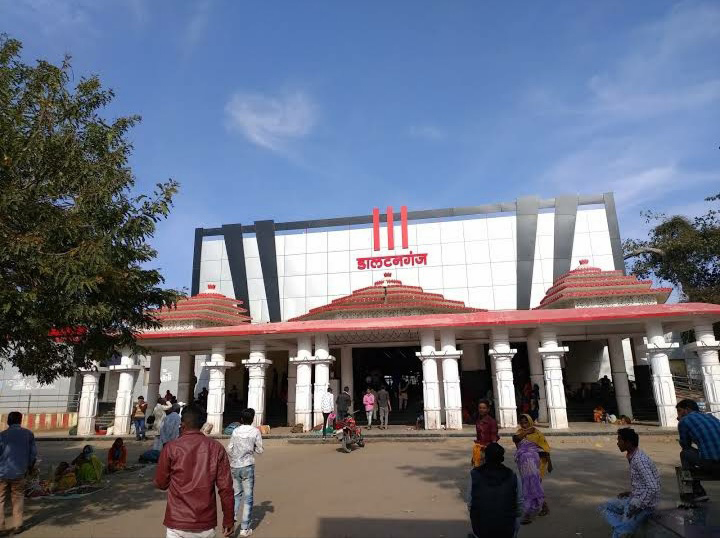
Daltonganj Railway Station

Medininagar is located 1,036 kilometres (644 mi) south east of New Delhi and is accessible by train to Daltonganj Railway station (DTO) from Ranchi, Bhopal Junction, Kolkata, Kota, Lucknow, Ahmedabad, Delhi, Jabalpur, Patna, Varanasi and Gaya. The nearest airport is 165 kilometres (103 mi) away in Ranchi. It has an airport in Chianki, used occasionally by visiting dignitaries.

Medininagar is well connected with Ranchi, Jamshedpur, Dhanbad, Raipur, Ambikapur, Kolkata, Durgapur, Varanasi, Delhi, Lucknow, Allahabad, Kota, Kanpur Gaya, Patna, and other locations by road.

Chianki Airstrip is located on the south of the Medininagar. It is mostly used by private choppers and small aircraft. There is a plan to strengthen and extend the airstrip for operation of medium size planes.

== Demographics ==
As of 2011 India census, Medininagar had a population of 389,307. Males constitute 53% of the population and females 47%. It has an average literacy rate of 87.29%, higher than the national average of 74.04%: male literacy is 91.92% and, female literacy is 82.10%. 13% of the population is under 6 years of age.

== Culture ==
Major Hindu and Christian festivals are celebrated in Medininagar. The town is the seat of the Roman Catholic Diocese of Daltonganj. The town has several societies, clubs, and NGOs including Palamau Club, Rotary Club and Rida Foundation.

Satyajit Ray's Bengali film, Aranyer Din Ratri was shot in Palamu and the Bollywood movie, Nastik starring Arjun Rampal was also shot in Medininagar.

Masoom art Group is an active NGO engaged in promotion of art and culture in the city. Their motion picture Pratyavartan was focused on the issue of Naxal movement in the state.

== Climate ==
Medininagar has a humid subtropical climate (Köppen climate classification Cwa).

Climate data for Medininagar (1991–2020, extremes 1901–2020)
Month	Jan	Feb	Mar	Apr	May	Jun	Jul	Aug	Sep	Oct	Nov	Dec	Year
Record high °C (°F)	34.2 (93.6)	40.6 (105.1)	43.9 (111.0)	46.5 (115.7)	48.8 (119.8)	46.9 (116.4)	43.8 (110.8)	40.2 (104.4)	39.7 (103.5)	40.0 (104.0)	36.5 (97.7)	33.2 (91.8)	48.8 (119.8)
Mean daily maximum °C (°F)	25.4 (77.7)	28.9 (84.0)	34.1 (93.4)	39.6 (103.3)	40.8 (105.4)	37.7 (99.9)	32.8 (91.0)	31.9 (89.4)	32.0 (89.6)	32.0 (89.6)	29.8 (85.6)	26.3 (79.3)	32.6 (90.7)
Daily mean °C (°F)	16.9 (62.4)	20.4 (68.7)	25.4 (77.7)	30.7 (87.3)	33.8 (92.8)	33.1 (91.6)	29.4 (84.9)	28.7 (83.7)	28.3 (82.9)	26.6 (79.9)	22.2 (72.0)	18.1 (64.6)	26.1 (79.0)
Mean daily minimum °C (°F)	9.1 (48.4)	12.0 (53.6)	16.8 (62.2)	22.3 (72.1)	26.5 (79.7)	27.5 (81.5)	26.1 (79.0)	25.6 (78.1)	24.7 (76.5)	20.9 (69.6)	14.7 (58.5)	9.7 (49.5)	19.5 (67.1)
Record low °C (°F)	0.0 (32.0)	0.6 (33.1)	5.6 (42.1)	11.2 (52.2)	17.8 (64.0)	18.6 (65.5)	18.2 (64.8)	20.6 (69.1)	17.2 (63.0)	10.0 (50.0)	4.0 (39.2)	1.7 (35.1)	0.0 (32.0)
Average rainfall mm (inches)	17.4 (0.69)	17.0 (0.67)	18.1 (0.71)	7.5 (0.30)	18.0 (0.71)	158.3 (6.23)	307.4 (12.10)	306.9 (12.08)	170.6 (6.72)	48.4 (1.91)	9.7 (0.38)	6.8 (0.27)	1,086 (42.76)
Average rainy days	1.3	1.4	1.9	1.0	1.6	7.0	14.3	14.2	9.7	2.7	0.6	0.6	56.2
Average relative humidity (%) (at 17:30 IST)	51	42	32	26	29	53	77	79	77	65	60	58	54
Source 1: India Meteorological Department
Source 2: Tokyo Climate Center (mean temperatures 1991–2020)

== Education ==
Nilamber-Pitamber University at Medininagar was established in 2009 and serves the Palamu division of Jharkhand.

There are many colleges for undergraduate, post graduate & other higher education in and around Medininagar which includes:

- DAV Institute of Engineering and Technology established by D.A.V College Managing Committee.
- Bhishma Narain Singh Law College
- Ganesh Lal Agrawal College
- Elite Public B.Ed. College
- Janta Shivratri College
- Jyoti Prakash Mahila B.Ed. College
- R K Brahman +2 High school, established in 1942

The major private schools in Medininagar include:

- Heritage International School (CBSE)
- M.K. DAV Public School, Chianki (CBSE)
- Sacred Heart School, Chianki (ICSE)
- Rotary School (Anand Shankar), Chainpur(CBSE)

== Medical Facilities ==
Town has a lot of Public as well as private medical facilities and attracts patients from neighbourhood Villages and Cities. The List Includes:

Public Hospitals:

- Medini Rai Medical College and Hospital, Palamu– Medininagar, Palamu

Private Hospitals:

- Prakash Chandra Jain Seva Sadan
- Aashi Care Hospital
- Shree Narayan Multispeciality Hospital

== Places of Interest ==
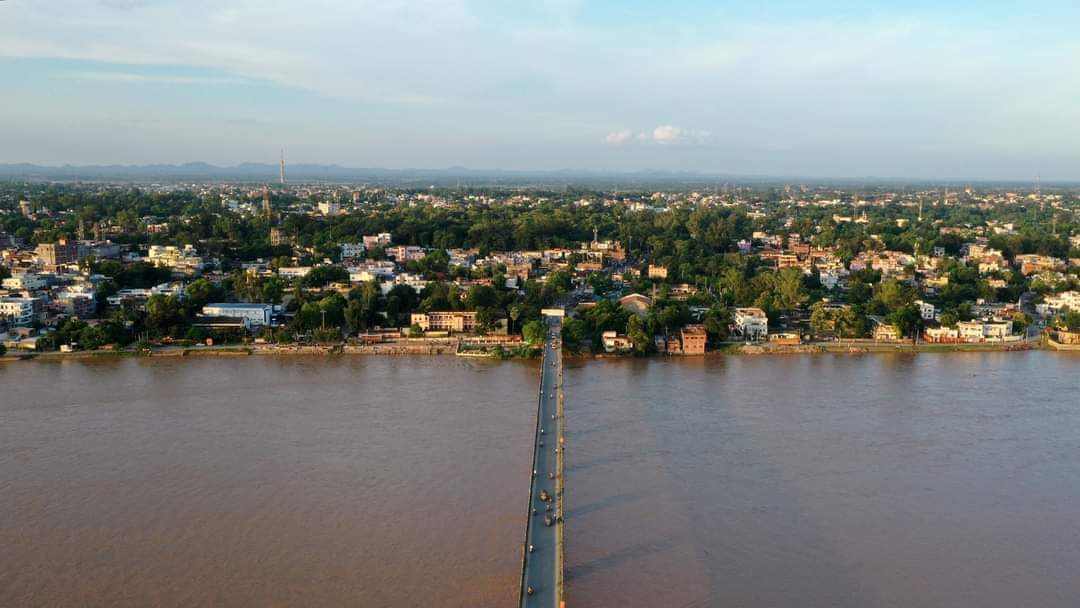
View of Medininagar from Koyal River

- Betla National Park, park hosts a wide variety of wildlife
- Palamau Tiger Reserve, one of the first tiger conservation projects in India whose brand ambassador is MS Dhoni
- Palamu fort, built in 15th century a twin forts structure by Medini Ray
- Kechki Forest Rest House, a shooting location for Satyajit Ray’s 1970 film Aranyer Din Ratri (Days and Nights in the Forest), located about 19 km from Medininagar (Daltonganj) in Palamu district, Jharkhand.
- B. R. Ambedkar Park, park jogging track along its beautiful lakes
- Bheem Chulha, a 5,000-year-old stove, on which Bhima used to make food during the Pandavas’ ignorance
- Bishrampur Fort, built by Chero rulers
- Gandhi Udyan Park, famous among the youngsters
- Hussainabad Fort, built by Mughal jagirdar, Hidayat Ali Khan.
- Kala-Kabra Mound, Harappan era artefacts
- Shahpur Fort, built by Chero ruler, Raja Medini Rai.

== See also ==
- Ladigarh
