= Lodh Falls =

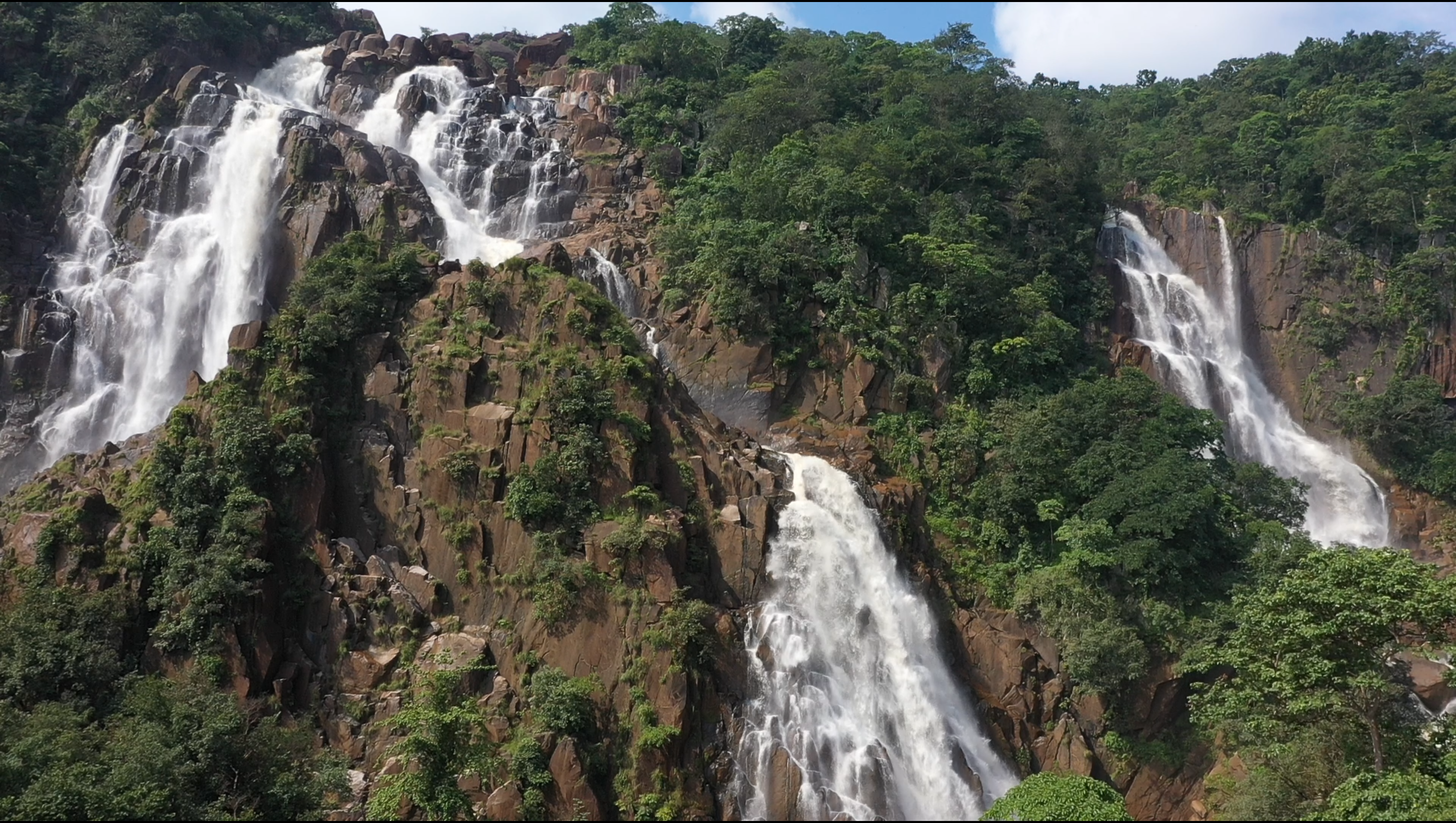

- Location within Jharkhand Location within India
- Location: Latehar district, Jharkhand. India
- Coordinates: 23°28′50″N 84°01′10″E
- Type: Tiered
- Elevation: 143 metres (469 ft)
- Longest drop: 143 m (469 ft)
- Watercourse: Burha River

The Lodh Falls (also known as Budha Ghagh) is a waterfall on the Burha River in the mid-forest of Palamau Tiger Reserve, in Latehar district of Jharkhand state in India. It is the highest waterfall in Jharkhand and the 21st highest waterfall in India.

== Waterfall ==
It is located on the Burha River, deep in the forest of the Latehar district the Chota Nagpur Plateau. The Lodh Falls is a tiered waterfall with multiple distinct drops in a relatively close succession. It is 143 metres (469 ft) high. The thundering sound of the fall is audible even 10 km away.

The Lodh Falls is an example of a nick point caused by rejuvenation. Knick point, also called a nick point or simply nick, represents breaks in slopes in the longitudinal profile of a river caused by rejuvenation. The break in channel gradient allows water to fall vertically giving rise to a waterfall.

== See also ==
- List of waterfalls
- List of waterfalls in India
- List of waterfalls in India by height
