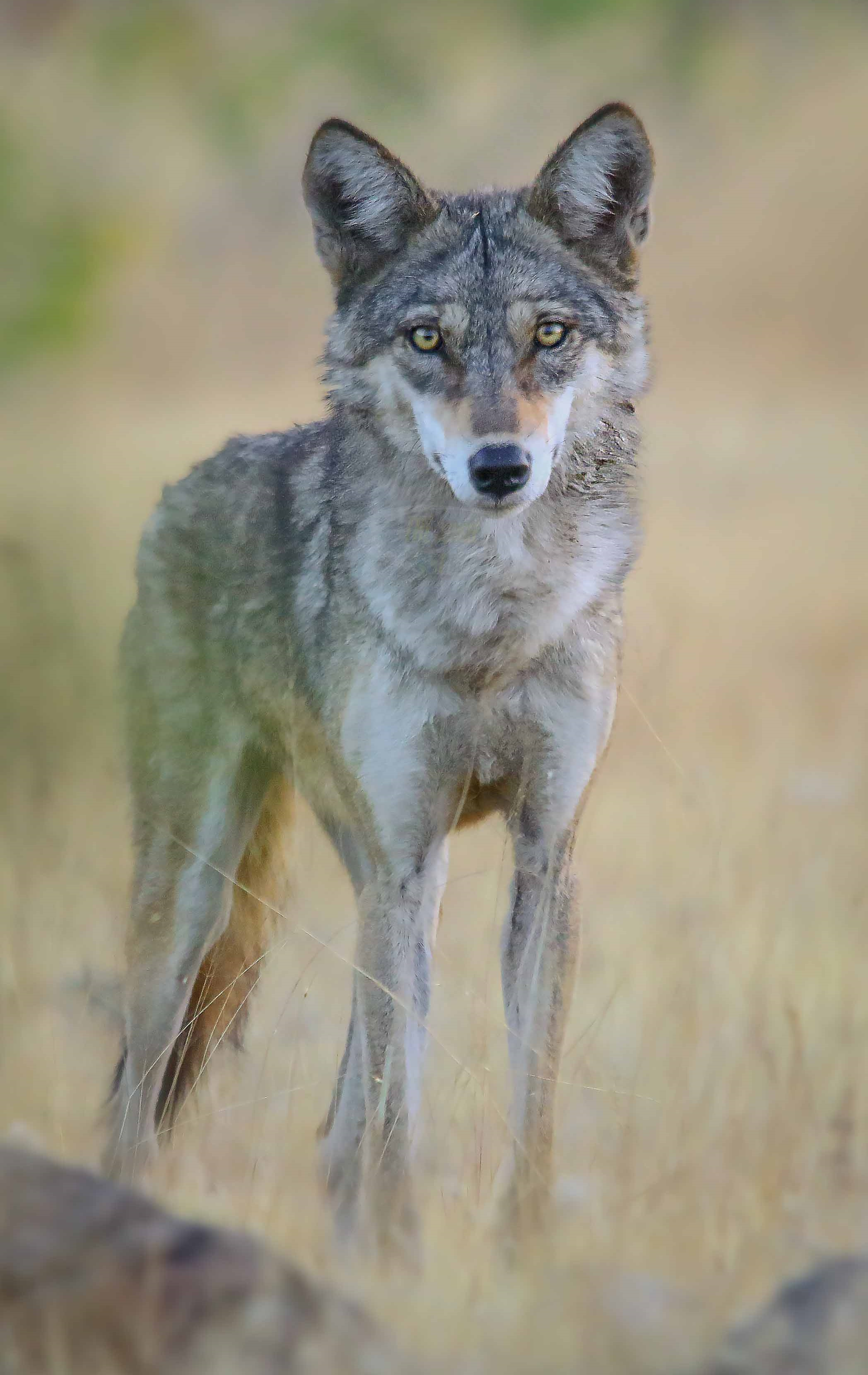

Conservation status
- Vulnerable (IUCN 3.1)

Scientific classification
- Kingdom: Animalia
- Phylum: Chordata
- Class: Mammalia
- Order: Carnivora
- Family: Canidae
- Genus: Canis
- Species: C. lupus
- Subspecies: C. l. pallipes

Trinomial name
- Canis lupus pallipes Sykes, 1831
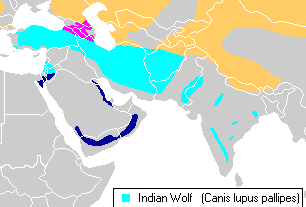
- Canis lupus pallipes distribution

Synonyms
- Canis pallipes pallipes

= Indian wolf =

Wolf subspecies

The Indian wolf (Canis lupus pallipes) is a subspecies of gray wolf that ranges from Southwest Asia to the Indian subcontinent. It is intermediate in size between the Himalayan wolf and the Arabian wolf, and lacks the former's luxuriant winter coat due to it living in warmer conditions. Within this subspecies, the "Indian plains wolf" is genetically basal to all other extant Canis lupus apart from the older-lineage Himalayan wolf, with both proposed as separate species. The Indian wolf travels in smaller packs and is less vocal than other variants of the gray wolf, and has a reputation for being cunning. The Indian wolf is one of the most endangered populations of gray wolf in the world.

== Taxonomy ==
The Indian wolf was first described to Western science in 1831 by the British ornithologist William Henry Sykes under the binomial Canis pallipes. In 1941, Reginald Pocock subordinated it to Canis lupus under the trinomial Canis lupus pallipes.

=== Canis indica ===
The Indian plains wolf (Canis lupus pallipes, synonym Canis indica) is formed by two closely related female lineage mitochondrial DNA haplotypes that fall within the Canis lupus pallipes subspecies of the gray wolf and is only found in the arid and semi-arid peninsular plains of India. These lineages are genetically unique from all other wolf lineageses worldwide, including from other wolves forming C. l. pallipes. The Indian gray wolf and the Himalayan wolf are phylogenetically basal to all other wolf subspecies and are closer to the African wolf. This indicates that these are the descendants of an ancient wolf distribution.

In April 2009, the Latin binomial Canis indica had been proposed for these two haplotypes as a nomenclatural and taxonomic split from Canis lupus as a new species through the Nomenclature Specialist on the CITES Animals Committee. The committee did not agree but recommended that the name be entered into the species database as a synonym of the name under which it was listed. The proposal was based on one study that relied on only a limited number of museum and zoo samples that may not have been representative of the wild population, and a call for further fieldwork was made.

Earlier, two studies had sequenced the mDNA of the Indian gray wolf and found that it is basal to all other extant Canis lupus haplotypes apart from the older-lineage Himalayan wolf. Later studies compared these sequences against worldwide wolf sequences and confirmed this basal position. One study, based on a fossil record, estimated that the divergence between the coyote and the wolf lineages occurred 1 million years ago and with an assumed wolf mutation rate, estimated that the divergence of the Indian gray wolf from the wolf/dog ancestor occurred 400,000 years ago. Another study, which expressed concerns about the earlier study, gave an estimate of 270,000 years ago.

The Indian grey wolf resembles C. l. pallipes in its outer appearance (morphological features) and its social/reproductive behavior, but it is smaller in size, and genetically distinct. These findings suggest that the Indian gray wolf is not the pallipes found in the Middle East and Central Asia. It was therefore proposed that the Indian gray wolf be reclassified as a separate species Canis indica. In 2016, a study of the mDNA of both modern and ancient wolves indicated that the Indian gray wolf and the Himalayan wolf were genetically basal when compared with all other gray wolves.

Phylogenetic tree for Canis lupus with timing in years (Note: For a full set of supporting references refer to the note (a) in the phylotree at Evolution of the wolf#Wolf-like canids)

- 250,000
  - 120,000
    - 80,000
      - 31,000
        - Dog
        - Holarctic gray wolf
      - Late Pleistocene wolf†
    - Indian plains wolf
  - Himalayan wolf

In 2021, a study compared both the mitochondrial DNA and the nuclear DNA (from the cell nucleus) from the wolves of the Himalayas with those of the wolves from the lowlands of the Indian subcontinent. The genomic analyses indicate that the Himalayan wolf and the Indian lowland wolf were genetically distinct from one another. These wolves were also genetically distinct from – and genetically basal to – the other wolf populations across the northern hemisphere. These other wolves form a single mitochondrial clade, indicating that they originated from a single expansion from one region within the last 100,000 years. However, the nuclear analysis indicated that the Indian lowland wolf and the Himalayan wolf had separated from this lineage around 200,000 years ago, with the Indian lowland wolf being genetically basal to the Himalayan wolf. This nuclear DNA finding conflicts with mitochondrial DNA findings of the Himalayan wolf being the most basal, however the Himalayan wolf has admixed with a more basal but unidentified canid and this is what was being reflected in its mDNA. Wolves from Syria and Iran clustered with the other wolves, although these and the Indian lowland wolves are taxonomically classified together as the single subspecies Canis lupus pallipes. The wolves of this subspecies share morphological characteristics due to their adaptation to arid environments. In 2022 whole-genome sequencing estimated the distinct gray wolf lineage living in the semi-arid lowland region of the Indian subcontinent diverged from other gray wolf populations around 110,000 years ago.

The taxonomic reference Mammal Species of the World (2005) does not recognize Canis indica, however NCBI/Genbank does list Canis lupus indica.

=== Iranian wolf ===
A study demonstrated minor morphological variations of the skull of Iranian wolves but these did not vary enough to classify them as being a separate subspecies, however their genetic lineage has not been verified.

== Description ==
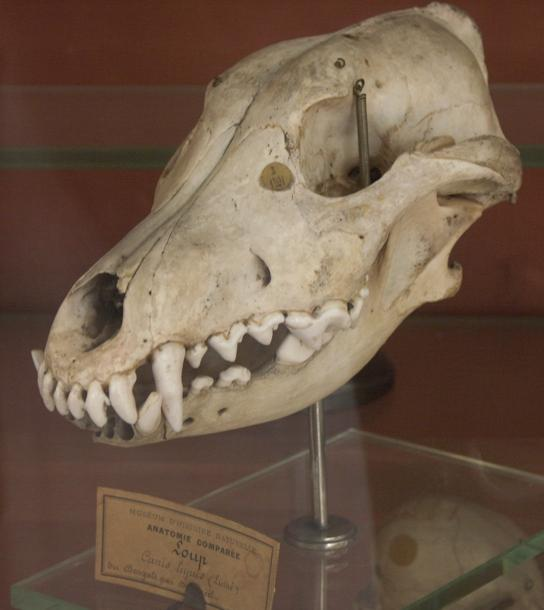
Skull specimen

The Indian wolf is similar in structure to the Eurasian wolf, but is smaller, more slightly built, and has shorter fur with little to no underfur. It is typically around 57–72 cm (22–28 in) at shoulder height, with males ranging from 19 to 25 kg (42 to 55 lb) and females 17–22 kg (37–49 lb) in weight. Its length ranges from 103 to 145 cm (41 to 57 in) from nose to tail. Like the Arabian wolf, it has short, thin fur in summer, though the hair on the back remains long even in summer, an adaptation thought to be against solar radiation. The fur is generally grayish-red to reddish-white with gray tones. The hairs are grizzled with black, particularly on the back, which sports a dark V-shaped patch around the shoulders. The limbs are paler than the body, and the underparts are almost completely white.

Wolf pups are born sooty-brown, with a milk-white patch on the chest that fades with age. Black specimens are rare, but have been recorded in India's Solapur district and two regions of Iran. In the latter country, the mutation was found to be naturally occurring, unlike in North American gray wolves, which have inherited the K^{b} allele responsible for melanism from past interbreeding with dogs.

== Distribution and habitat ==
=== West Asia ===
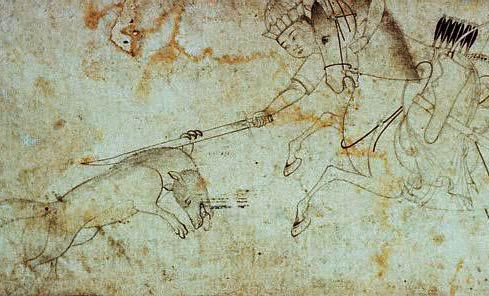
A miniature, depicting a wolf hunt in ancient Persia

During the 19th century, the Indian wolf was widespread in many parts east and west of the Jordan River. However, the population declined considerably between 1964 and 1980, largely due to persecution by farmers. Currently, Israel's conservation policies and effective law enforcement maintain a moderately sized wolf population, which radiates into neighbouring countries. Turkey may play an important role in maintaining wolves in the region, due to its contiguity with Central Asia. The mountains of Turkey have served as a refuge for the few wolves remaining in Syria. A small wolf population of 80-100 occurs in the Golan Heights, and is well protected by the military activities there. Although Turkish wolves have no legal protection, they may number about 7,000 individuals.

Little is known of current wolf populations in Iran, which once occurred throughout the country in low densities during the mid-1970s. Although widespread throughout the country, being absent only in the central desert and Dasht-e Lut, there is no reliable estimation on the wolf's population size there. Wolves in Iran continue to suffer from habitat loss, unregulated hunting and loss of prey.

=== Indian subcontinent ===
Indian wolf in Western India

The northern regions of Afghanistan and Pakistan are strongholds of the Indian wolf. In India, the Indian wolf population is concentrated in the Pir Panjal Range of the Indian Himalayan Region and has been estimated at about 300 individuals in approximately 60,000 km^{2} (23,000 sq mi) of Jammu and Kashmir, and 50 more in Himachal Pradesh. It also occurs in the states of Gujarat, Rajasthan, Haryana, Uttar Pradesh, Madhya Pradesh, Jharkhand, Maharashtra, Karnataka, Kerala and Andhra Pradesh.

The Indian wolf mainly occurs outside protected areas and feeds mainly on livestock, such as goats or sheep. However, in areas where natural prey is still abundant, as in Blackbuck National Park, Velavadar or Panna Tiger Reserve, it prefers wild prey species. Mahuadanr Wolf Sanctuary in the state of Jharkhand is the only wolf sanctuary in the country.

The Indian wolf is protected since 1972 and classified as Endangered, with many populations lingering in low numbers or living in areas increasingly used by humans. Its population was estimated at 2,000-3,000 individuals in 2004, and there was an estimated 3,100 Indian wolves were in India in 2022. In March 2023, ten captive-bred wolves were released in Gujarat, a first for India.

Hindus traditionally considered the hunting of wolves, even dangerous ones, as taboo, for fear of causing a bad harvest. The Santals, however, considered them fair game, as with every other forest-dwelling animal. During British India, it was not considered a game species and was killed primarily in response to attacking game herds, livestock, and people. In 1876, in the North-Western Provinces and Bihar State, 2,825 wolves were killed in response to 721 fatal attacks on humans. Two years later, 2,600 wolves were killed in response to attacks leaving 624 humans dead. By the 1920s, wolf extermination remained a priority in the North-Western Provinces and Awadh. Overall, over 100,000 wolves were killed for bounties in British India between 1871 and 1916.

== Behaviour and ecology ==
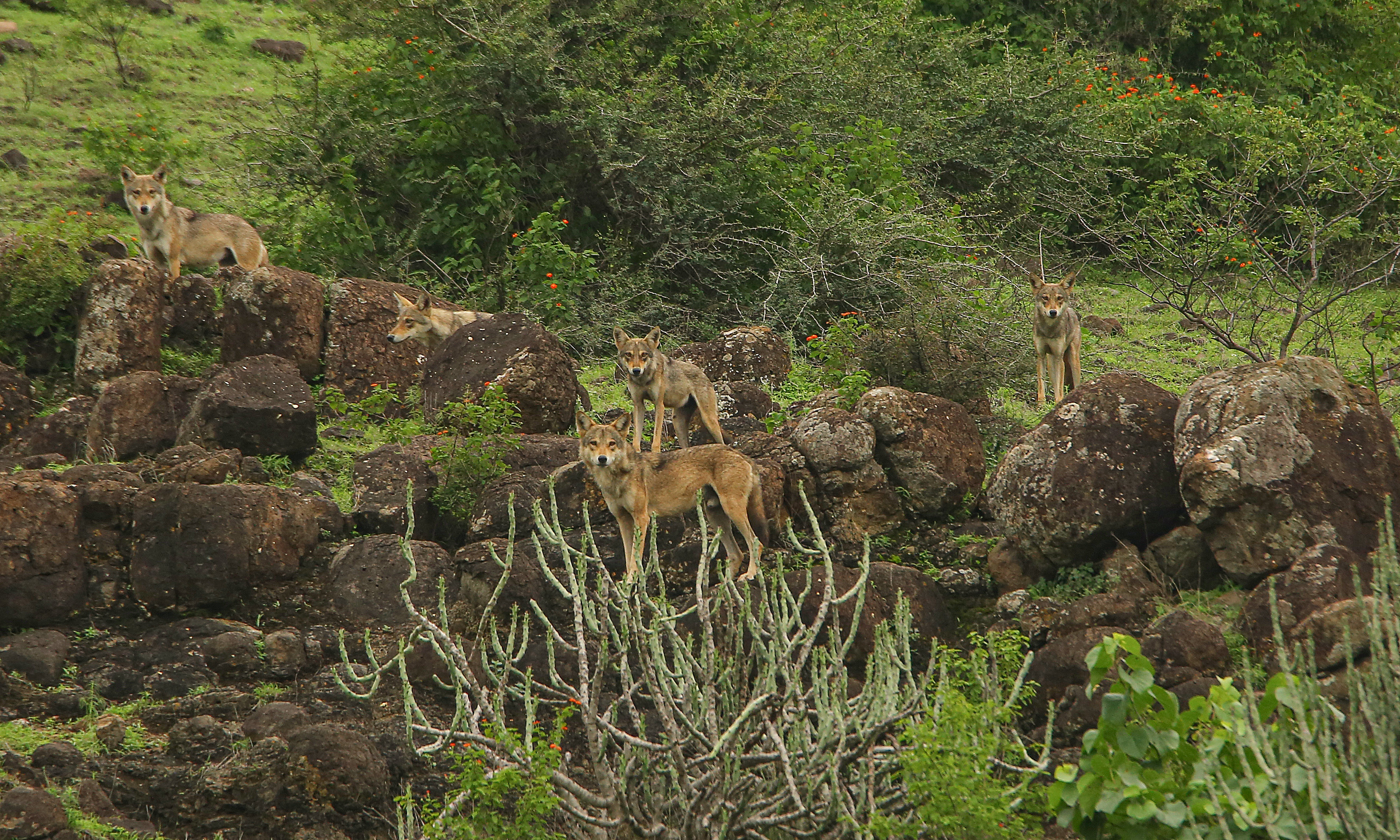
A pack of Indian gray wolves

The Indian wolf's habits are similar to those of other grey wolf subspecies, though the Indian wolf generally lives in smaller packs rarely exceeding 6-8 individuals, and is relatively less vocal, having rarely been known to howl. Indian wolf vocalization includes howls, howl-barks, whimper, social squeals, and whines with howls an average fundamental frequency of 422 Hz and whines 906 Hz. There is at least one record of a lone wolf associating with a pair of dholes in Debrigarh Wildlife Sanctuary. It tends to breed from mid-October to late December, and whelp in holes or ravines. It typically preys on antelopes, rodents, and hares. It usually hunts in pairs when targeting antelopes, with one wolf acting as a decoy while the other attacks from behind. The range of the Indian wolf overlaps with the golden jackal, sloth bear, leopard, Bengal fox, brown bear, Asiatic lion and Bengal tiger.

=== Hunting ===
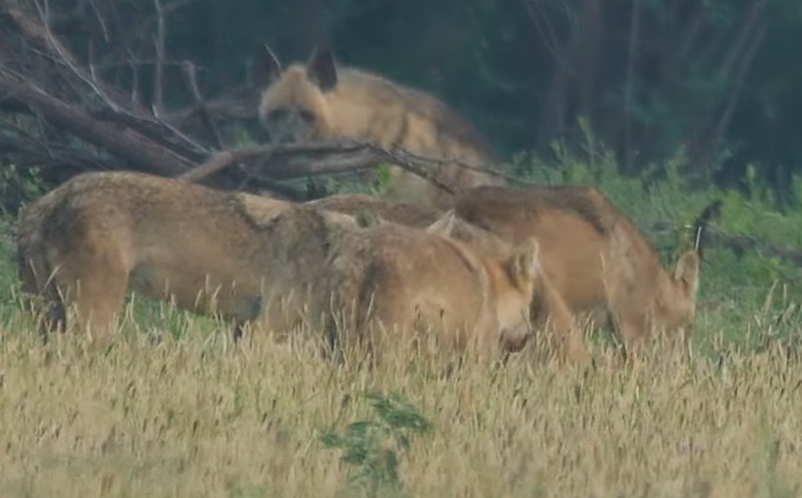
Indian wolves consuming a blackbuck in Velavadar

Indian wolves are nocturnal and hunt from dusk to dawn, using different strategies for their various prey animals. These wolves are said to be exceptional in speed and endurance. An Indian wolf pack will spread themselves out when hunting Indian hares and various rodents, in contrast to coordinating when their target is the swift blackbuck antelope. The blackbuck is the major prey animal for wolves in Nannaj and Blackbuck National Park and constitute up to 88% of Indian wolf biomass consumption. Because the antelope is faster, Indian wolves will usually chase it toward ravines, bushes or hollows, where more wolves wait in ambush. In addition to leading antelopes into an ambush, Indian wolves can chase blackbucks down hills for a short-term burst in speed. Indian wolves may also select a sick or injured animal and separate it from the herd, pursuing it to exhaustion. This strategy is commonly seen in gray wolves, and often proves successful. Finally, when they close the distance and attack, a single wolf would grab the snout to asphyxiate the antelope while others attack the rear. Indian wolves are also reported to use curiosity to lure antelopes in for a kill. One story remarks that a wolf rolled over, legs upright, when the blackbucks were feeding. When the antelope accidentally disturbed this wolf, two others sprung up for the kill.

== Relationships with humans ==
=== Attacks on humans ===
Indian wolves have a history of preying on children, a phenomenon called "child-lifting". In 1878, 624 people were killed by wolves in Uttar Pradesh, and 14 were killed in Bengal. In 1900, 285 people were killed in the Central Provinces. Between 1910 and 1915, 115 children were killed by wolves in Hazaribagh, and 122 were killed in the same area in 1980–1986. In Jaunpur, Pratapgarh and Sultanpur in Uttar Pradesh, wolves killed 21 children and mauled 16 others from March 27, 1996, to July 1, 1996. Between April 1993 and April 1995, five wolf packs attacked 80 children, 20 of whom were rescued, in Hazaribagh, West Koderma and Latehar Forest Divisions. The children were taken primarily in the summer during the evening hours, and often within human settlements.

In Iran, wolf attacks have been reported for millennia. As with India, many cases of wolves making off with small children have been reported. Adults have been attacked on occasion, including an incident in which a policeman was killed and partially eaten by three wolves after dismounting from his horse to relieve himself. On January 2, 2005, in the village of Vali Asr, near the town of Torbat Heydariya, northeastern Iran, a wolf pack attacked a homeless man in front of witnesses. Although the police intervened, the man died of his wounds.

=== Predation on livestock ===
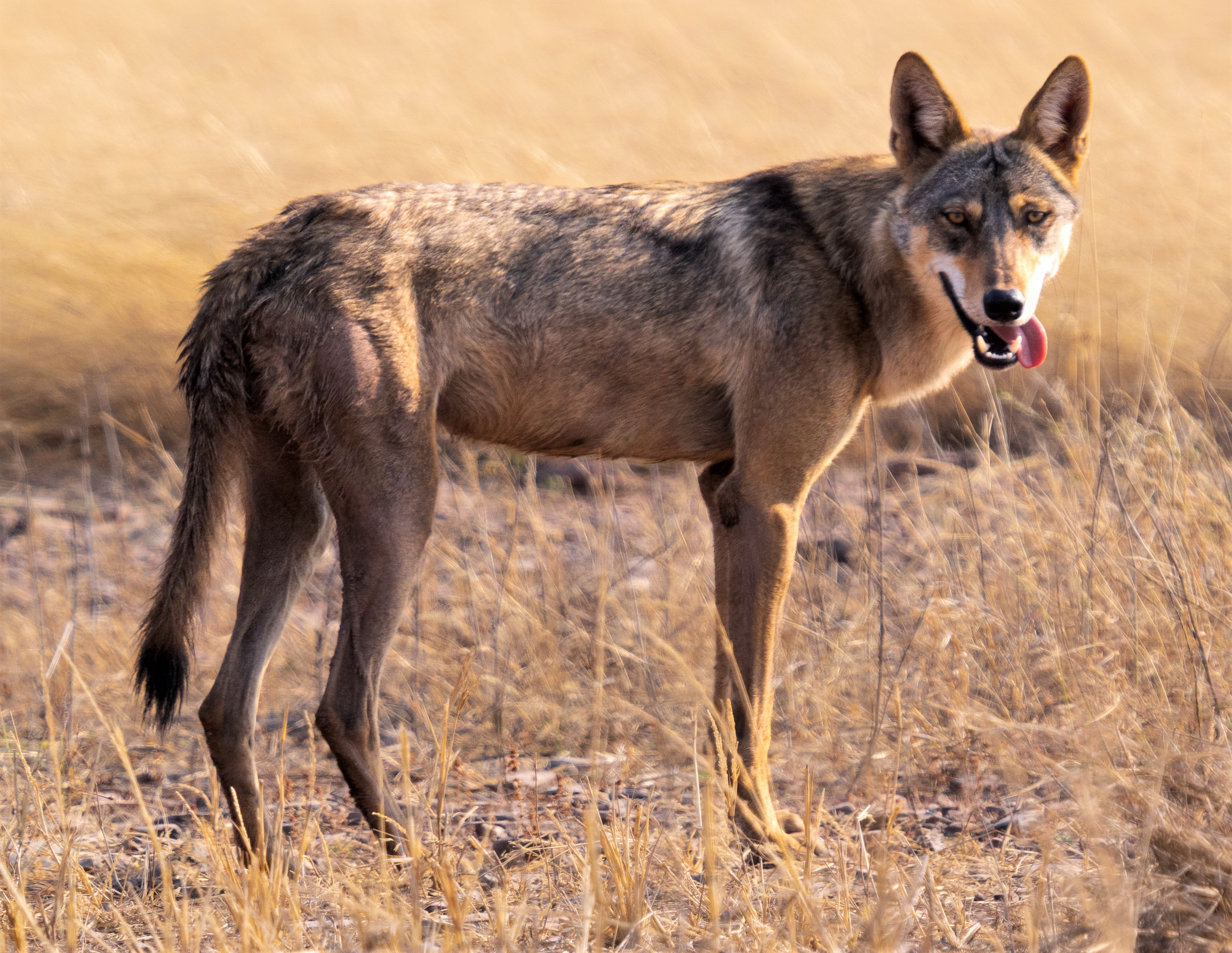
Indian wolf occupy dry grasslands where they may prey on livestock

Indian wolves will feed on livestock when natural prey is scarce. This causes human-wolf conflicts and wolf persecution since human population density is high in these areas. Grass is quickly grazed by livestock in unprotected grasslands that cannot sustain a blackbuck population afterward. Among domestic animals, goats are the primary target for Indian wolves, comprising 66% of wolf attacks around the Jhelum district, with sheep following at 27%. Wolves are also more prone to preying on livestock during denning periods and with pups below 5–6 months old. It is not uncommon for locals to exaggerate the magnitude of Indian wolf depredation and tell tales of their predatory wiles, contributing to hatred of the animal.

Human–wildlife conflict has emerged as a major threat to the survival of the Indian wolf, particularly where human settlement and agriculture expansion coincides with its territory. With increasing grasslands and scrublands being converted into agricultural lands or cities, Indian wolves have no other option but to venture into villages in search of food. It most commonly leads to livestock predation, especially where wild prey is scarce. Wolf population are poisoned, trapped or killed in retaliation by organized groups in local communities. In contrast to such more charismatic or safeguarded species as tigers or elephants, the Indian wolf lacks substantial legal protection under Indian wildlife law and is thus more liable to persecution. Additionally, myths and negative perceptions about the Indian wolf provide additional fuel for conflict since, at times, it is perceived as dangerous or not worthy of protection. To mitigate this conflict, community education and improved practice in livestock management, along with legal protection of the ecological function of the Indian wolf, is necessary.

=== In culture ===
Like the fox and the coyote, the Indian wolf has a reputation for being clever. There are many stories of their stratagems told by locals, observers and shepherds. The people of Maharashtra would sing labad landga dhong kartay, in Marathi which translates to "Wolves are clever animals and will fool you with their devilish methods."

Wolves are occasionally mentioned in Hindu mythology. In the Harivamsa, Krishna, to convince the people of Vraja to migrate to Vrindavan, creates hundreds of wolves from his hairs, which frighten the inhabitants of Vraja into making the journey. In the Rig Veda, Rijrsava is blinded by his father as punishment for having given 101 of his family's sheep to a she-wolf, who in turn prays to the Ashvins to restore his sight. Bhima, the voracious son of the god Vayu, is described as Vrikodara, meaning "wolf-stomached".

The wolf has an ambivalent reputation in Iranian culture, being demonised in the Avestas as a creation of Ahriman, and still features in contemporary cautionary tales told to misbehaving children.

Indian wolves take a central role in Rudyard Kipling's The Jungle Book series, in which a pack in the Seoni area of Madhya Pradesh adopts the feral child Mowgli, and teaches him how to survive in the jungle while protecting him from the Bengal tiger Shere Khan.
