= Latehar district =

Coordinates: 23°43′48″N 84°28′12″E

- District of Jharkhand
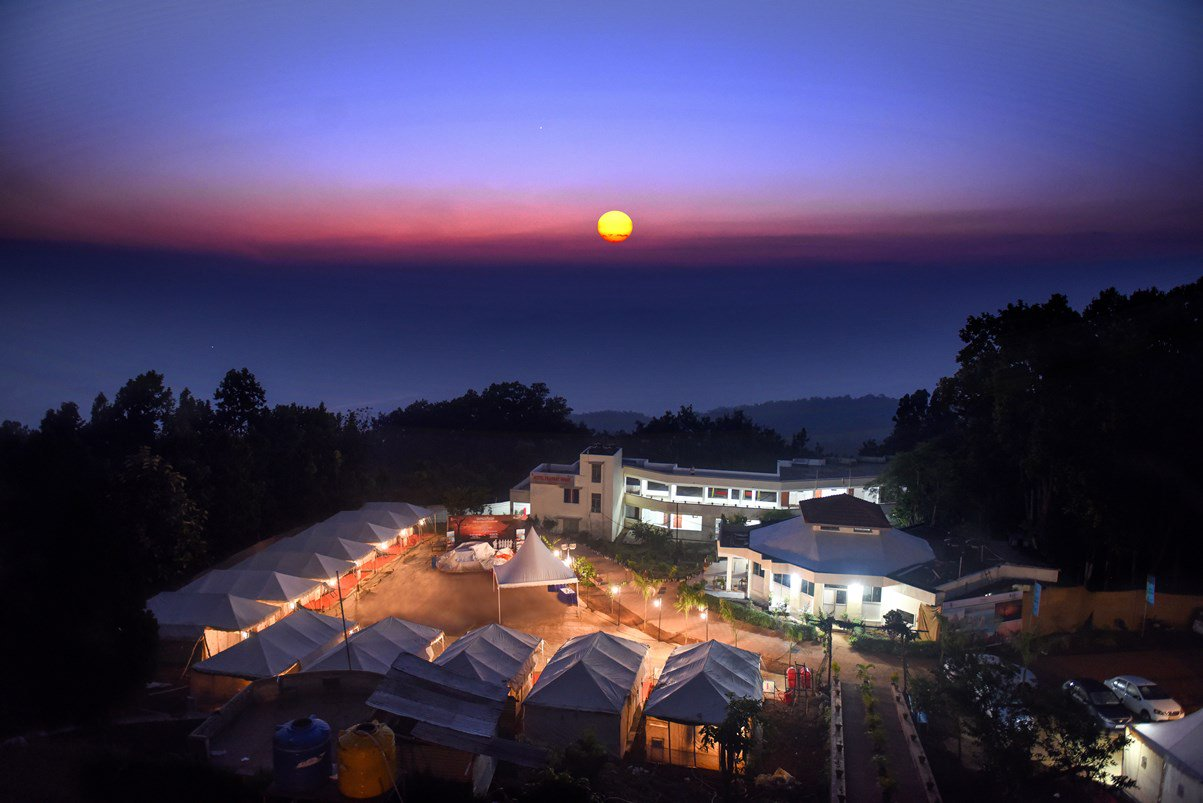
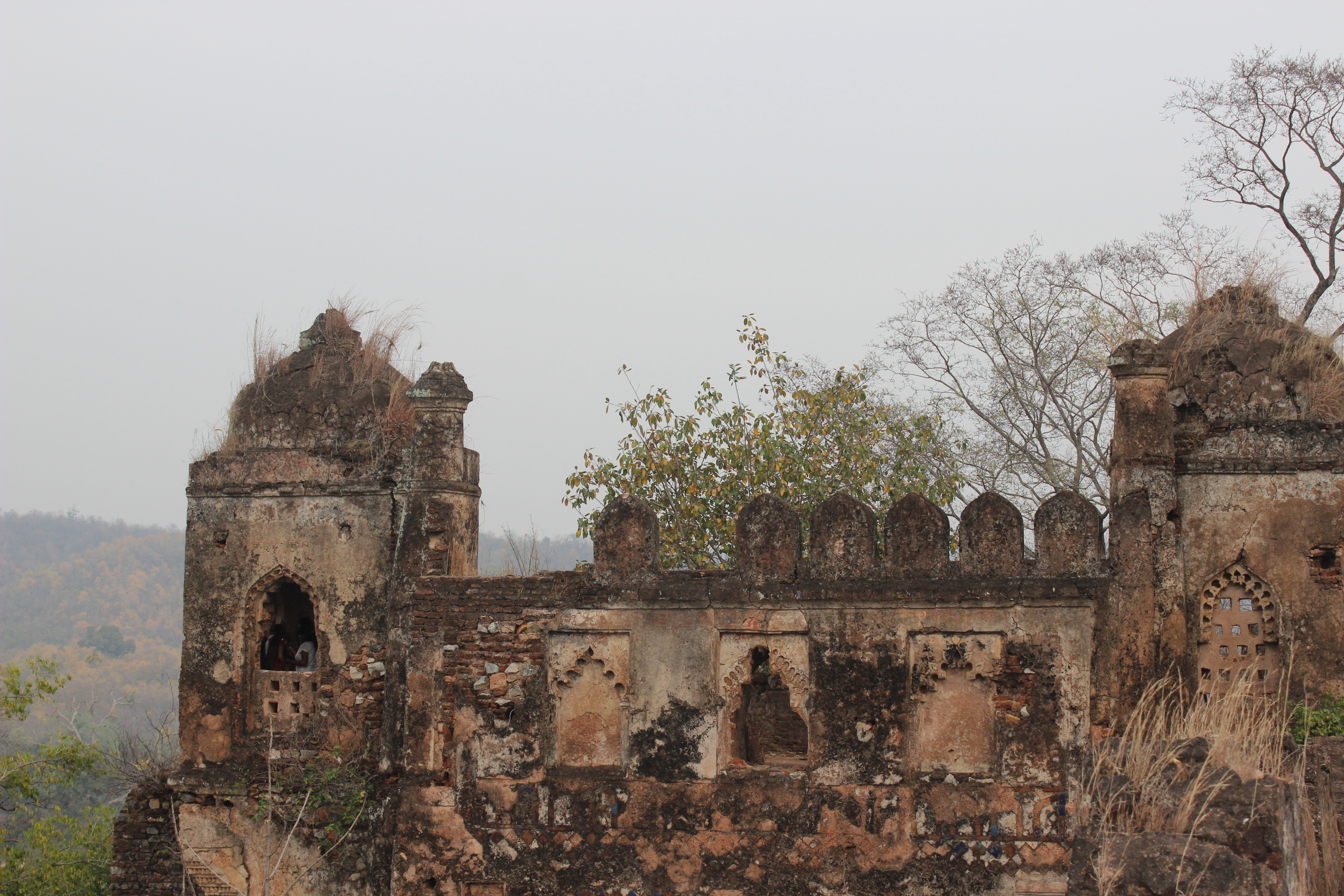
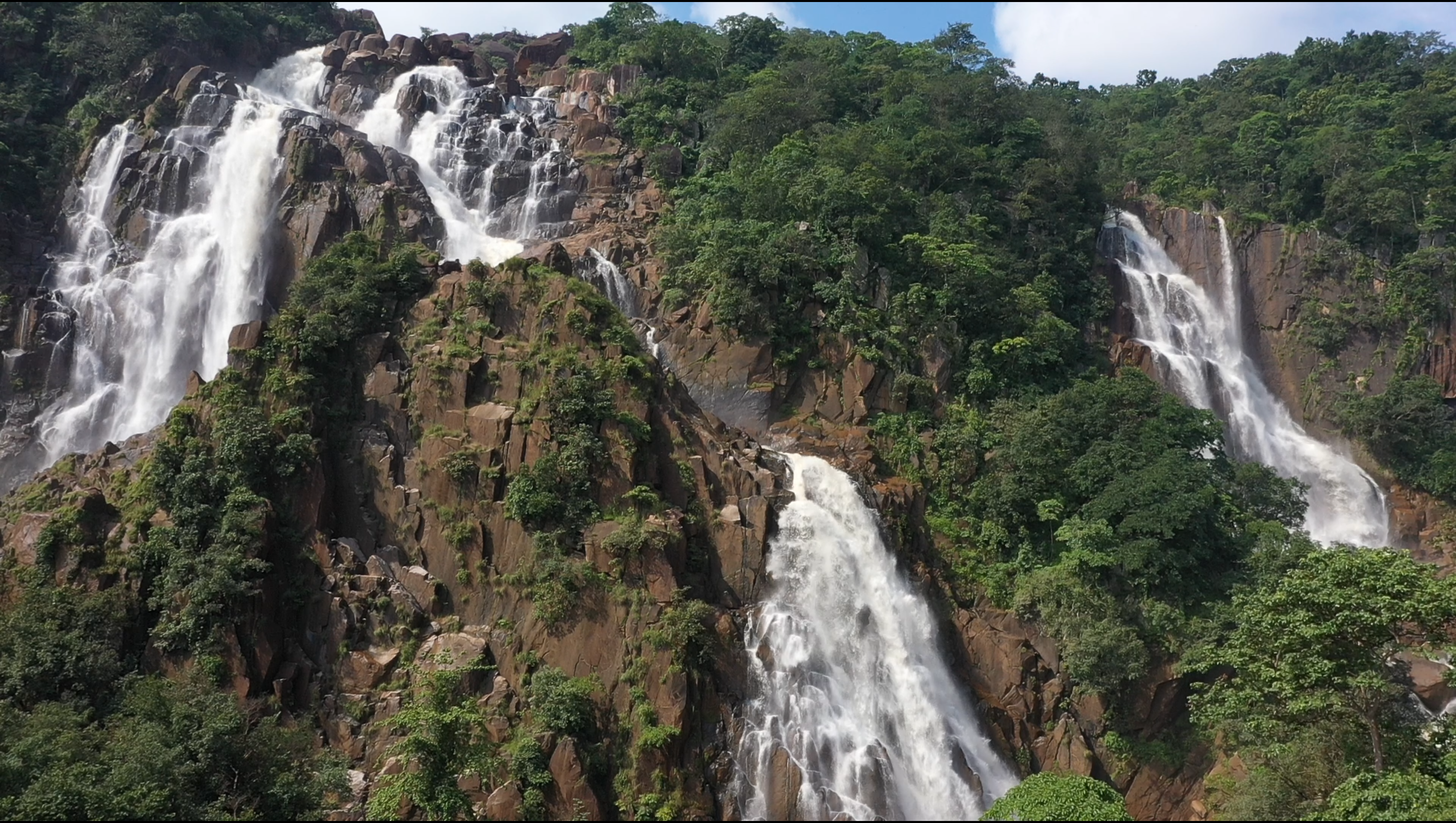
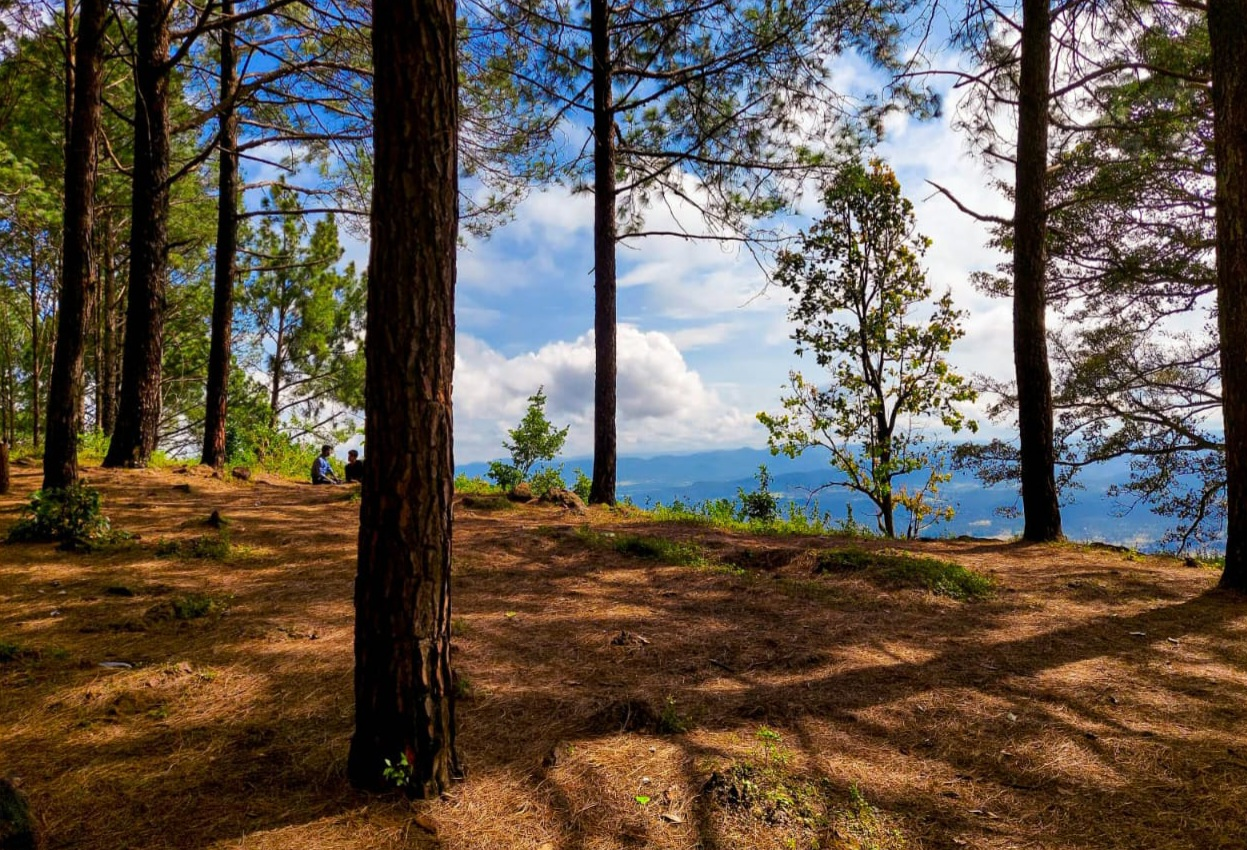
- Top to bottom: Birds-eye view of Prabhat Vihar Government guest house at Netarhat in the evening, View of Palamu Fort from Betla National Park, Lodh Falls, Pine trees at Netarhat
- Interactive map of Latehar district
- Country: India
- State: Jharkhand
- Division: Palamu
- Headquarters: Latehar

Government
  - Deputy Commissioner: Sandip Kumar, IAS
  - Lok Sabha constituencies: Chatra (shared with Chatra district)
  - Vidhan Sabha constituencies: 2 Latehar Assembly constituency, Manika Assembly constituency
  - Latehar MLA: Prakash Ram, BJP
  - Manika MLA: Ramchandra Singh, INC

Area
  - Total: 3,659.59 km^{2} (1,412.98 sq mi)

Population (2011)
  - Total: 726,978
  - Density: 198.650/km^{2} (514.501/sq mi)

Demographics
  - Literacy: 59.51 per cent
  - Sex ratio: 964
- Time zone: UTC+05:30 (IST)
- Website: http://latehar.nic.in/

Latehar district is one of the 24 districts of Jharkhand state in eastern India, and Latehar town is the administrative headquarters of this district. This district is part of Palamu division.

Latehar district is situated on longitude 84° 31' E and 23° 44.4' N latitude. The area of the district is 3660 km², with a population of 726,978 (2011 census).

== History ==
The territory covered by the present district became a part of Palamu district, when it formed on 1 January 1928. Latehar district was created on 4 April 2001 by separating the erstwhile Latehar subdivision of Palamu district. It is currently a part of the Red Corridor.

== Geography ==
- Latehar district has two of the highest waterfalls in Jharkhand – Lodh Falls and Lower Ghaghri Falls, along with several others.
- Netarhat is hill station in the district.
- Betla National Park and Mahuadanr Wolf Sanctuary is located in this District.

== Administration ==
=== Blocks/Mandals ===
Latehar district consists of 9 blocks. The following are the list of the blocks in Latehar district:

1. Latehar Block
2. Chandwa Block
3. Balumath Block
4. Manika Block
5. Barwadih Block
6. Garu Block
7. Mahuadanr Block
8. Bariyatu Block
9. Herhanj Block

=== Politics ===
There are two Vidhan Sabha constituencies in this district: Manika and Latehar. Both are part of Chatra Lok Sabha constituency.

District	No.	Constituency	Name	Party	Alliance	Remarks	Latehar	73	Manika	Ramachandra Singh
74	Latehar	Prakash Ram		BJP	NDA		Latehar			

== Demographics ==
Historical population
Year	Pop.	±% p.a.
1901	126,790	—
1911	140,616	+1.04%
1921	149,957	+0.65%
1931	167,407	+1.11%
1941	186,627	+1.09%
1951	201,560	+0.77%
1961	239,575	+1.74%
1971	299,630	+2.26%
1981	359,930	+1.85%
1991	457,040	+2.42%
2001	560,894	+2.07%
2011	726,978	+2.63%

Religion in Latehar district (2011)
Religion	Percent
Hinduism	65.07%
Sarna	18.37%
Islam	9.60%
Christianity	6.55%
Other or not stated	0.41%

According to the 2011 census Latehar district has a population of 726,978. Roughly equal to the nation of Bhutan or the US state of Alaska. This gives it a ranking of 499th in India (out of a total of 640). The district has a population density of 200 inhabitants per square kilometre (520/sq mi). Its population growth rate over the decade 2001-2011 was 29.38%. Latehar has a sex ratio of 964 females for every 1000 males, and a literacy rate of 59.51%. 7.13% of the population lives in urban areas. Scheduled Castes and Scheduled Tribes make up 21.31% and 45.54% of the population respectively.

Languages of Latehar district (2011)
1. Hindi (40.6%)
2. Sadri (27.1%)
3. Kurukh (18.3%)
4. Magahi (6.04%)
5. Urdu (5.09%)
6. Other (2.86%)

At the time of the 2011 Census of India, 40.60% of the population in the district spoke Hindi, 27.10% Sadri, 18.31% Kurukh, 6.04% Magahi and 5.09% Urdu as their first language.

== Economy ==
In 2006 the Indian government named Latehar one of the country's 250 most backward districts (out of a total of 640). It is one of the districts in Jharkhand currently receiving funds from the Backward Regions Grant Fund Programme (BRGF).

== Tourism ==
- Netarhat
- Betla National Park
- Palamu fort
- Lodh Falls
- Lower Ghaghri Falls

== See also ==
- Districts of Jharkhand
- Palamu district
- Garhwa district
