= Dhurki Garhwa =

Dhurki
- Block
- Location in Jharkhand, India Dhurki (India)
- Coordinates: 24.13°N 83.44°E
- Country: India
- State: Jharkhand
- District: Garhwa
- Block: Dhurki

Languages
  - Official: Bhojpuri, Hindi
- Time zone: UTC+5:30 (IST)
- PIN: 822121
- Vehicle registration: JH

Dhurki is one of the administrative blocks of Garhwa district, Jharkhand state, India.

== About Dhurki Garhwa Jharkhand ==
Dhurki a Taluka/Block, close to Garhwa, is located 46 km from Garhwa. Dhurki is located in north west of Garhwa. It is one of the border location of Jharkhand.

=== Languages ===
Languages spoken here include Asuri, an Austroasiatic language spoken by approximately 17 000 in India, largely in the southern part of Palamu; and Bhojpuri, a tongue in the Bihari language group with almost 40 000 000 speakers, written in both the Devanagari and Kaithi scripts.

== Facilities ==
- Market: A small market called Dhurki bazar is situated in middle of the block.

== See also ==
- Garhwa district
- Palamu district
- Jharkhand
