= Dandai Garhwa =

Dandai
- Block
- Location in Jharkhand, India Dandai (India)
- Coordinates: 24.07°N 83.64°E
- Country: India
- State: Jharkhand
- District: Garhwa
- Block: Dandai

Languages
  - Official: Bhojpuri, Hindi
- Time zone: UTC+5:30 (IST)
- PIN: 822114
- Vehicle registration: JH

Dandai is one of the administrative blocks of Garhwa district, Jharkhand state, India. It is located 22 km from Garhwa, in the south of Garhwa. It is one of the border locations of Jharkhand.

== Languages ==
Languages spoken here include Asuri, an Austroasiatic language spoken by approximately 17 000 in India, largely in the southern part of Palamu; and Bhojpuri, a tongue in the Bihari language group with almost 40 000 000 speakers, written in both the Devanagari and Kaithi scripts.

== Facilities ==
A small market called as Dandai bazar is situated in the middle of the block.

Dandai is well covered by Vodafone, Airtel, Uninor, Reliance, BSNL, Aircel, Idea, Airtel 3G, like cellular networks.

== See also ==
- Garhwa district
- Jharkhand
