= Ketar Garhwa =

Ketar
- Block
- Location in Jharkhand, India Ketar (India)
- Coordinates: 24.47°N 83.55°E
- Country: India
- State: Jharkhand
- District: Garhwa

Population (2011)
  - Total: 50,821

Languages
  - Official: Bhojpuri, Hindi
- Time zone: UTC+5:30 (IST)
- PIN: 822124
- Vehicle registration: JH

Ketar is one of the administrative blocks of Garhwa district, Jharkhand state, India.

== About Ketar ==
Ketar a Taluka/Block, is located 61 km from Garhwa. Ketar is located near sone river.

== Demographics ==
According to the 2011 census of India, Ketar CD block had a total population of 50,821, all of which were rural. Ketar had a sex ratio of 916 females per 1000 males and a literacy rate of 61.29%. Population in the age range 0–6 years was 8,745. Scheduled Castes numbered 12,075 (23.76%) and Scheduled Tribes numbered 6,653 (13.09%).

=== Language and religion ===
Religion in Ketar CD block (2011)
Hinduism	96.32%
Islam	3.62%
Other or not stated	0.06%

Hindus are the majority community in the block.

Languages in Ketar CD block (2011)
1. Magahi (72.9%)
2. Bhojpuri (20.1%)
3. Hindi (6.97%)
4. Others (0.03%)

The majority language spoken in this block is Hindi and a dialect of Magahi.

== Facilities ==
- Market: A small market called as Ketar bazar is situated in middle of the block.

== See also ==
- Garhwa district
- Garhwa
- Jharkhand
