= Bishunpura Garhwa =

Bishunpura
- Block
- Location in Jharkhand, India Bishunpura (India)
- Coordinates: 24.30°N 83.66°E
- Country: India
- State: Jharkhand
- District: Garhwa

Population (2011)
  - Total: 32,242

Languages
  - Official: Bhojpuri, Hindi
- Time zone: UTC+5:30 (IST)
- PIN: 822128
- Vehicle registration: JH-14

Bishunpura is one of the administrative blocks of Garhwa district, Jharkhand state, India.

== About Bishunpura Garhwa Jharkhand ==
Bishunpura a Taluka (Block), close to Garhwa, is located 35 km from Garhwa. Bishunpura is located in north west of Garhwa. It is one of the border location of Jharkhand. It's well covered by Vodafone, Airtel, Uninor, Reliance, BSNL, Aircel, Idea, Airtel 3G, like cellular networks, and also 5g network and bands.

== Demographics ==
According to the 2011 census of India, Bishunpura CD block had a total population of 32,242, of which the entire population lived in rural areas. Bishunpura had a sex ratio of 934 females per 1000 males and a literacy rate of 55.14%. Population in the age range 0–6 years was 5,622. Scheduled Castes numbered 8,453 (26.22%) and Scheduled Tribes numbered 1,738 (5.39%).

=== Language and religion ===
Religion in Bishunpura CD block (2011)
Hinduism	83.36%
Islam	16.44%
Other or not stated	0.20%

Hindus are the majority community in the block.

Languages in Bishunpura CD block (2011)
1. Magahi (95.3%)
2. Hindi (4.36%)
3. Others (0.34%)

The majority language spoken in this block is Hindi and a dialect of Bhojpuri and Magahi.

== Facilities ==
- Market: A small market called as Bishunpura bazar is situated in middle of the block.

== Railway ==
Ramna, a railway station of ECR is not more than 10 km away from Bishunpura bazar.

== See also ==
- Garhwa district
- Palamu district
- Jharkhand
