= Ranka Garhwa =

Ranka
- Block
- Location in Jharkhand, India Ranka (India)
- Coordinates: 23.99°N 83.79°E
- Country: India
- State: Jharkhand
- District: Garhwa
- Block: Ranka

Languages
  - Official: Bhojpuri, Hindi
- Time zone: UTC+5:30 (IST)
- PIN: 822125
- Vehicle registration: JH

Ranka is one of the administrative blocks of Garhwa district, Jharkhand state, India.

== About Ranka Garhwa Jharkhand ==
Ranka a Taluka/Block, close to Ranka, is located 22 km from Garhwa. Ranka is located on NH343. It's well covered by Vodafone, Airtel, Uninor, Reliance, BSNL, Aircel, Idea, Airtel 3G, like cellular networks.

=== Languages ===
Languages spoken here include Asuri, an Austroasiatic language spoken by approximately 17 000 in India, largely in the southern part of Palamu; and Bhojpuri, a tongue in the Bihari language group with almost 40 000 000 speakers, written in both the Devanagari and Kaithi scripts.

== Facilities ==
- Market: A small market called as Ranka bazar is situated in middle of the block.

== See also ==
- Garhwa district
- Jharkhand
