= Kharaundhi Garhwa =

Kharaundhi
- Block
- Location in Jharkhand, India Kharaundhi (India)
- Coordinates: 24.42°N 83.42°E
- Country: India
- State: Jharkhand
- District: Garhwa
- Block: Kharaundhi

Languages
  - Official: Bhojpuri, Hindi
- Time zone: UTC+5:30 (IST)
- PIN: 822112
- Vehicle registration: JH

Kharaundhi is one of the administrative blocks of Garhwa district, Jharkhand state, India.

== About Kharaundhi Garhwa Garhwa Jharkhand ==
kharaundhi a Taluka/Block/प्रखंड, close to nagar uttari railway station, is located 34 km from kharaundhi. it is located in south of Garhwa. It's well covered by Jio, Vodafone, Airtel, BSNL, Airtel 3G, like cellular networks.kharaundhi is two side of uttar pradesh boundary and one side bihar boundary.

=== Languages ===
Languages spoken here include Asuri, an Austroasiatic language spoken by approximately 17 000 in India, largely in the southern part of Palamu; and Bhojpuri, a tongue in the Bihari language group with almost 40 000 000 speakers, written in both the Devanagari and Kaithi scripts.

== Facilities ==
- Market: A big market called as Kharaundhi bazar is situated in middle of the block.
- Mandir: Devi mandir, Thkurbari, and Sankar bhagwan Mandir

== See also ==
- Garhwa district
- Jharkhand
