= Chinia Garhwa =

Chinia
- Block
- Location in Jharkhand, India Chinia (India)
- Coordinates: 24.06°N 83.63°E
- Country: India
- State: Jharkhand
- District: Garhwa
- Block: Chinia

Languages
  - Official: Bhojpuri, Hindi
- Time zone: UTC+5:30 (IST)
- PIN: 822114
- Vehicle registration: JH

Chinia is one of the administrative blocks of Garhwa district, Jharkhand state, India.

== About Chinia Garhwa Jharkhand ==
Chinia a Taluka (Block), is located 65 km from Garhwa. Chinia is located in north west of Garhwa. It is one of the border location of Jharkhand. It's well covered by Vodafone, Airtel, Uninor, Reliance, BSNL, Aircel, Idea, Airtel 3G, like cellular networks.

=== Languages ===
Languages spoken here include Asuri, an Austroasiatic language spoken by approximately 17 000 in India, largely in the southern part of Palamu; and Bhojpuri, a tongue in the Bihari language group with almost 40 000 000 speakers, written in both the Devanagari and Kaithi scripts.

== Facilities ==
- Market: A small market called as Chinia bazar is situated in middle of the block.

== See also ==
- Garhwa district
- Jharkhand
