= Sagma Garhwa =

Sagma
- Block
- Location in Jharkhand, India Sagma (India)
- Coordinates: 24.21°N 83.46°E
- Country: India
- State: Jharkhand
- District: Garhwa
- Block: Sagma

Languages
  - Official: Bhojpuri, Hindi
- Time zone: UTC+5:30 (IST)
- PIN: 822121
- Vehicle registration: JH

Sagma is one of the administrative blocks of Garhwa district, Jharkhand state, India.

== About Bhandaria Garhwa Jharkhand ==
Sagma a Taluka/Block, close to Nagar Untari, is located 43 km from Garhwa. Sagma is located in west of Garhwa. It is one of the border location of Jharkhand. It's well covered by Vodafone, Airtel, Uninor, Reliance, BSNL, Aircel, Idea, Airtel 3G, like cellular networks.

=== Languages ===
Languages spoken here include Asuri, an Austroasiatic language spoken by approximately 17 000 in India, largely in the southern part of Palamu; and Bhojpuri, a tongue in the Bihari language group with almost 40 000 000 speakers, written in both the Devanagari and Kaithi scripts.

== Facilities ==
- Market: A small market called as Sagma bazar is situated in middle of the block.

== See also ==
- Garhwa district
- Jharkhand
