= Danda Garhwa =

Danda
- Block SBI BANK
- Location in Jharkhand, India Danda (India)
- Coordinates: 24.13°N 83.94°E
- Country: India
- State: Jharkhand
- District: Garhwa
- Block: Danda

Languages
  - Official: Bhojpuri, Hindi
- Time zone: UTC+5:30 (IST)
- PIN: 822124
- Vehicle registration: JH

Danda is one of the administrative blocks of Garhwa district, Jharkhand state, India.

== About Danda Garhwa Jharkhand ==
Danda a Taluka/Block, close to Ranka, is located 40 km from Garhwa. Danda is located near koel river besides one of famous Lalgarh Village (nearest Railway Station) It's well covered by Vodafone, Airtel, Uninor, Reliance, BSNL, Aircel, Idea, Airtel 3G, like cellular networks.

=== Languages ===
Languages spoken here include Asuri, an Austroasiatic language spoken by approximately 17 000 in India, largely in the southern part of Palamu; and Bhojpuri, a tongue in the Bihari language group with almost 40 000 000 speakers, written in both the Devanagari and Kaithi scripts. danda situated at the bank of koyal river

== Facilities ==
- Market: A small market called as Danda bazar is situated in middle of the block. Near Danda Bazar Located SBI BANK

== See also ==
- Garhwa district
- Jharkhand
