= Manjhiaon Garhwa =

Manjhiaon
- Block

- Location in Jharkhand, India Manjhiaon (India)
- Coordinates: 24.32°N 83.82°E
- Country: India
- State: Jharkhand
- District: Garhwa
- Block: Manjhiaon

Population (2011)
  - Total: 70,935

Languages
  - Official: Bhojpuri, Hindi
- Time zone: UTC+5:30 (IST)
- PIN: 822114
- Vehicle registration: JH 14

Manjhiaon is one of the administrative blocks of Garhwa district, Jharkhand state, India.

== About Manjhiaon Garhwa Jharkhand ==
Manjhiaon a Taluka/Block, close to Garhwa, is located 20 km from Garhwa. Manjhiaon is located near Koel river. It's well covered by Vodafone, Airtel, Uninor, Reliance, BSNL, Aircel, Idea, and like cellular networks.

== Demographics ==
According to the 2011 census of India, Majhiaon CD block had a total population of 70,935, of which 25.87% lived in urban areas. Majhiaon had a sex ratio of 922 females per 1000 males and a literacy rate of 64.33%. Population in the age range 0–6 years was 9,511. Scheduled Castes numbered 20,698 (29.18%) and Scheduled Tribes numbered 2,659 (3.75%).

=== Language and religion ===
Religion in Majhiaon CD block (2011)
Hinduism	82.96%
Islam	16.63%
Other or not stated	0.41%

Hindus are the majority community in the block.

Languages in Majhiaon CD block (2011)
1. Hindi (90.6%)
2. Urdu (9.20%)
3. Others (0.16%)

The majority language spoken in this block is Hindi and a dialect of Bhojpuri and Magahi.

== Facilities ==
- Market: A small market called as Manjhiaon bazar is situated in middle of the block.

== See also ==
- Districts of Jharkhand
- Palamu district
- Garhwa district
- Latehar district
