= Bhawnathpur Garhwa =

Bhawnathpur
- Block
- Location in Jharkhand, India Bhawnathpur (India)
- Coordinates: 24.38°N 83.57°E
- Country: India
- State: Jharkhand
- District: Garhwa
- Block: Bhawnathpur

Population (2011)
  - Total: 85,319

Languages
  - Official: Bhojpuri, Hindi
- Time zone: UTC+5:30 (IST)
- PIN: 822112
- Vehicle registration: JH14

Bhawnathpur is one of the administrative blocks of Garhwa district, Jharkhand state, India.

== About Bhawnathpur Garhwa Jharkhand ==
Bhawnathpur a Taluka/Block, close to Ranka, is located 40 km from Garhwa. It's well covered by Vodafone, Airtel, Uninor, Reliance, BSNL, Aircel, Idea, Airtel 3G, like cellular networks. SAIL (RMD) has limestone and dolomite mines in Bhawanathpur.

== Demographics ==
According to the 2011 census of India, Bhawnathpur CD block had a total population of 85,319, of which 6.17% lived in urban areas. Bhawnathpur had a sex ratio of 910 females per 1000 males and a literacy rate of 60.17%. Population in the age range 0–6 years was 15,457. Scheduled Castes numbered 21,928 (25.70%) and Scheduled Tribes numbered 10,876 (12.75%).

=== Language and religion ===
Religion in Bhawnathpur CD block (2011)
Hinduism	91.55%
Islam	7.96%
Other or not stated	0.49%

Hindus are the majority community in the block.

Languages in Bhawnathpur CD block (2011)
1. Magahi (68.9%)
2. Hindi (22.8%)
3. Bhojpuri (6.62%)
4. Others (1.68%)

The majority language spoken in this block is Hindi, and the major dialects are Magahi and Bhojpuri.

== Facilities ==
A small market called Bhawnathpur bazar is situated in middle of the block.

== See also ==
- Garhwa district
- Jharkhand
