= Ramna Garhwa =

Ramna
- Block
- Location in Jharkhand, India Ramna (India)
- Coordinates: 24.22°N 83.60°E
- Country: India
- State: Jharkhand
- District: Garhwa
- Block: Ramna

Languages
  - Official: Bhojpuri, Hindi
- Time zone: UTC+5:30 (IST)
- PIN: 822128
- Vehicle registration: JH

Ramna is one of the administrative blocks of Garhwa district, Jharkhand state, India.

== About Ramna Garhwa Jharkhand ==
Ramna a Taluka/Block, is located 23 km from Garhwa. Ramna is located in north west of Garhwa. It is one of the border location of Jharkhand. It's well covered by Vodafone, Airtel, Uninor, Reliance, BSNL, Aircel, Idea, Airtel 3G, like cellular networks.

== Demographics ==
According to the 2011 census of India, Ramna CD block had a total population of 70,584, of which the entire population lived in rural areas. Ramna had a sex ratio of 931 females per 1000 males and a literacy rate of 57.09%. Population in the age range 0–6 years was 12,969. Scheduled Castes numbered 19,363 (27.43%) and Scheduled Tribes numbered 8,770 (12.42%).

=== Language and religion ===
Religion in Ramna CD block (2011)
Hinduism	87.21%
Islam	12.69%
Other or not stated	0.10%

Hindus are the majority community in the block.

Languages in Ramna CD block (2011)
1. Magahi (94.5%)
2. Bhojpuri (4.10%)
3. Hindi (1.06%)
4. Others (0.39%)

The majority language spoken in this block is Hindi and a dialect of Bhojpuri and Magahi.

== Facilities ==
- Market: A small market called as Ramna bazar is situated in middle of the block.

== See also ==
- Garhwa district
- Jharkhand
