= Bardiha Garhwa =

Bardiha
- Block
- Location in Jharkhand, India Bardiha (India)
- Coordinates: 24.37°N 83.73°E
- Country: India
- State: Jharkhand
- District: Garhwa
- Block: Bardiha

Languages
  - Official: Bhojpuri, Hindi
- Time zone: UTC+5:30 (IST)
- PIN: 822114
- Vehicle registration: JH

Bardiha is one of the administrative blocks of Garhwa district, Jharkhand state, India.

== Geography ==
Bardiha a Taluka (Block), is located 65 km from Garhwa. Bardiha is located in north west of Garhwa. It is one of the border location of Jharkhand. It's well covered by Vodafone, Airtel, Uninor, Reliance, BSNL, Aircel, Idea, Airtel 3G, like cellular networks.

== Demographics ==
According to the 2011 census of India, Bardiha CD block had a total population of 37,930, of which the entire population lived in rural areas. Bardiha had a sex ratio of 922 females per 1000 males and a literacy rate of 52.70%. Population in the age range 0–6 years was 7,043. Scheduled Castes numbered 12,391 (32.67%) and Scheduled Tribes numbered 2,700 (7.12%).

=== Language and religion ===
Religion in Bardiha CD block (2011)
Hinduism	83.95%
Islam	15.83%
Other or not stated	0.22%

Hindus are the majority community in the block.

Languages in Bardiha CD block (2011)
1. Hindi (95.8%)
2. Urdu (4.19%)
3. Others (0.05%)

The majority language spoken in this block is Hindi and a dialect of Bhojpuri and Magahi.

== Facilities ==
- Market: A small market called as Bardiha bazar is situated in middle of the block.

== See also ==
- Garhwa district
- Jharkhand
