= Kandi, Garhwa =

Kandi
- Community development block & Village
- Location in Jharkhand, India Kandi (India)
- Coordinates: 24.4518°N 83.7640°E
- Country: India
- State: Jharkhand
- District: Garhwa

Government
  - Type: Gram Panchayat / Block administration

Population (2011)
  - Total: 81,521

Languages
  - Official: Hindi
  - Regional: Asuri, Bhojpuri
- Time zone: UTC+5:30 (IST)
- Postal code: 822120
- Vehicle registration: JH-14

Kandi is a community development block and a rural village located in the Garhwa district of the Indian state of Jharkhand. It serves as an administrative, economic and cultural centre for nearby rural settlements. The block forms part of the Palamu division.

== Geography ==
Kandi is located at 24.4518°N 83.7640°E in the north-western plateau of Jharkhand. The region includes undulating terrain, low hillocks, mixed red and black soils and patches of dry tropical forest. The climate is tropical with hot summers, cool winters and monsoon rainfall from June to September.

The block is bordered by Nawhatta to the north, Haidernagar to the east, Manjhiaon to the south and Bhawanathpur to the west.

== History ==
The region historically belonged to the Magadh cultural area, later forming part of Chero chieftaincies and the Palamu estate. In the British period it fell under the Palamu district of the Bengal Presidency. After 2000, it became part of the newly created state of Jharkhand.

== Administration ==
Kandi is both a village and the headquarters of a community development block and tehsil.

=== Block structure ===
The block contains more than a dozen gram panchayats and around 90–95 villages. The block administration is headed by the Block Development Officer, while the village is managed by the Kandi Gram Panchayat.

== Demographics ==
According to the 2011 Census:

=== Block population ===
- Total: 81,521
- Males: 42,541
- Females: 38,980
- Sex ratio: 916 females per 1,000 males
- Literacy rate: about 67%
- Children (0–6 years): about 13,000

=== Kandi village ===
- Population: 3,113
- Households: 535

== Languages ==
Languages spoken include Hindi (official), Bhojpuri (widely spoken) and Asuri (a tribal Austroasiatic language).

== Economy ==
The economy is chiefly agricultural. Major crops include paddy, wheat, lentils, maize, oilseeds and vegetables. Livestock rearing and dairy contribute to household incomes.

Kandi Bazaar serves as the main commercial area of the block. Petrol pumps and agro-supply shops support local transport and farming.

== Education ==
Schools in the block include higher secondary schools, middle schools and primary schools in various villages, along with a few English-medium private schools. Kandi High School is one of the popular schools in the town.

== Healthcare ==
Healthcare is provided through the Primary Health Centre in Kandi and several sub-centres in surrounding villages. Serious medical cases are referred to Garhwa or Daltonganj.

== Transportation ==
Kandi is connected by road to Garhwa and nearby blocks. Transport is mainly through buses and shared autos. The nearest major railway station is Garhwa Road Junction. NH-39 provides regional highway access.

== Culture ==
Cultural traditions reflect Bhojpuri and Magadhi influences. Major festivals include Chhath Puja, Holi, Diwali, Durga Puja and the tribal Karma festival. Folk arts include Bhojpuri seasonal songs and tribal music.

== Public services ==
Facilities include the post office (PIN 822120), police station, Panchayat Bhawan, ration shops and block-level offices.

== Challenges ==
The block faces issues such as road damage during monsoon, electricity fluctuations, medical staff shortages, migration for labour and summer water scarcity.

== Nearby villages ==
Kanri, Kusha, Kodwariya, Lamarikala, Manjhiaon and Dumarsota.

== See also ==
- Garhwa district
- Jharkhand
- Palamu division
