= Ramkanda Garhwa =

Ramkanda
- Block
- Coordinates: 23.84°N 83.87°E
- Country: India
- State: Jharkhand
- District: Garhwa
- Block: Ramkanda

Languages
  - Official: Bhojpuri, Hindi
- Time zone: UTC+5:30 (IST)
- PIN: 822125
- Vehicle registration: JH

Ramkanda is one of the administrative blocks of Garhwa district, Jharkhand state, India.

== About Ramkanda Garhwa Garhwa Jharkhand ==
Ramkanda a Taluka/Block/प्रखंड, close to Barwadih Junction railway station, is located 40 km from Barwadih. Ramkanda is located in south of Garhwa. It's well covered by Vodafone, Airtel, Uninor, Reliance, BSNL, Aircel, Idea, Airtel 3G, like cellular networks.

== Demographics ==
According to the 2011 census of India, Ramkanda CD block had a total population of 44,452, of which the entire population lived in rural areas. Ramkanda had a sex ratio of 973 females per 1000 males and a literacy rate of 49.01%. Population in the age range 0–6 years was 8,796. Scheduled Castes numbered 13,140 (29.56%) and Scheduled Tribes numbered 15,887 (35.74%).

Religion in Ramkanda CD block (2011)
Hinduism	84.31%
Islam	8.02%
Christianity	4.65%
Other religions	2.64%
Other or not stated	0.38%

Hindus are the majority community in the block.

Languages in Ramkanda CD block (2011)
1. Hindi (58.5%)
2. Sadri (35.4%)
3. Mundari (2.18%)
4. Magahi (1.55%)
5. Bhojpuri (1.14%)
6. Kurukh (0.96%)
7. Others (0.31%)

The majority language spoken in this block is Hindi and Sadri.

== Facilities ==
- Market: A small market called as Ramkanda bazar is situated in middle of the block.

== See also ==
- Garhwa district
- Jharkhand
