= Bhandaria, Garhwa =

Bhandaria
- Block
- Coordinates: 23.73°N 83.82°E
- Country: India
- State: Jharkhand
- District: Garhwa
- Block: Bhandaria

Languages
  - Official: Bhojpuri, Hindi
- Time zone: UTC+5:30 (IST)
- PIN: 822114
- Vehicle registration: JH

Bhandaria is one of the administrative blocks of Garhwa district, Jharkhand state, India.

== About Bhandaria Garhwa Jharkhand ==
Bhandaria a Taluka/Block, close to Ramanujganj, is located 65 km from Garhwa. Bhandaria is located in south of Garhwa. It is one of the border location of Jharkhand. There is no network access at this location even after having huge population.

== Demographics ==
According to the 2011 census of India, Bhandaria CD block had a total population of 66,092, of which the entire population lived in rural areas. Bhandaria had a sex ratio of 970 females per 1000 males and a literacy rate of 58.19%. Population in the age range 0–6 years was 12,889. Scheduled Castes numbered 7,428 (11.24%) and Scheduled Tribes numbered 39,653 (60.00%).

Religion in Bhandaria CD block (2011)
Hinduism	72.35%
Christianity	18.11%
Islam	6.45%
Other religions	2.94%
Other or not stated	0.15%

Hindus are the majority community in the block.

Languages in Bhandaria CD block (2011)
1. Sadri (54.1%)
2. Hindi (41.2%)
3. Kurukh (1.94%)
4. Magahi (1.05%)
5. Urdu (0.95%)
6. Others (0.74%)

The majority language spoken in this block is Sadri.

== Facilities ==
- Market: A small market called as Bhandaria bazar is situated in middle of the block.

== See also ==
- Garhwa district
- Jharkhand
