= Meral (India) =

- Block
- Nickname: मेराल
- Location in jharkhand, India
- Coordinates: 24.18°N 83.71°E
- Country: India
- State: Jharkhand
- District: Garhwa
- Block: Meral

Government
  - MLA: Sri Satyendra Nath Tiwari; Bhartiy Janta Party विधायक प्रतिनिधि = श्री Dr.Lal Mohan

Population (2011)
  - Total: 130,308

Languages
  - Official: Magahi, Hindi
- Time zone: UTC+5:30 (IST)
- PIN: 822133
- Website: garhwa.nic.in/meral.html

Meral is a town in Garhwa district, Jharkhand state, India.

== Geography ==
It is located at an altitude of 242 m, 217 km from the state capital, Ranchi, in Time Zone UTC +5:30 .

== Population ==
According to census 2011 had a population of 130,308 inhabitants.
