= Garhwa railway station =

Railway station in Jharkhand, India

GARHWA
- Indian Railways logo

General information
- Location: Garhdevi Muhalla, Garhwa, Jharkhand; India
- Coordinates: 24.18°N 83.82°E
- Elevation: 197 metres (646 ft)
- System: Express train and Passenger train station
- Owner: Indian Railways
- Operator: East Central Railways
- Platforms: 3
- Tracks: 5

Construction
- Structure type: Standard on ground
- Parking: Yes

Other information
- Status: Functional
- Station code: GHQ
- Zone(s): East Central Railway zone
- Division(s): Dhanbad
Location
- Location within Jharkhand Location within India

Garhwa railway station (station code: GHQ) is a railway station located in Garhwa district, Jharkhand. This is a railway station for Garhwa which is a headquarter of Garhwa district. It belongs to East Central Railway. All major express and passenger train stop here.
