= Nagar Untari =

Shree Banshidhar Nagar Nagar Untari
- Sub-Division
- Location in Jharkhand, India Shree Banshidhar Nagar (India)
- Coordinates: 24.28°N 83.50°E
- Country: India
- State: Jharkhand
- District: Garhwa
- Block: Shree banshidhar nagar
- Established: 2007

Government
  - MLA: Bhanu Pratap Sahi
- Elevation: 248 m (814 ft)

Population
  - Total: 116,059
  - Rank: 32

Languages
  - Official: Nagpuri, Hindi
- Time zone: UTCIST(UTC+5:30) (IST)
- PIN: 822121
- Vehicle registration: JH 14

Shree Banshidhar Nagar, formerly known as Nagar Untari, is one of the administrative block in Garhwa district, Jharkhand state, India. It is located 40 km towards west from District headquarters Garhwa. Shree Banshidhar Nagar is surrounded by states Uttar Pradesh, Chhattisgarh and Bihar.

Ranchi is the state capital of it which is located around 212.5 km away.

This place is famous for Baba Shree Banshidhar and Raja Pahari . Shree Banshidhar temple contains century old gold statue of Radha-Krishna and Raja Pahari(Shiva Temple) located at the Top of a Hill.

== Geography ==
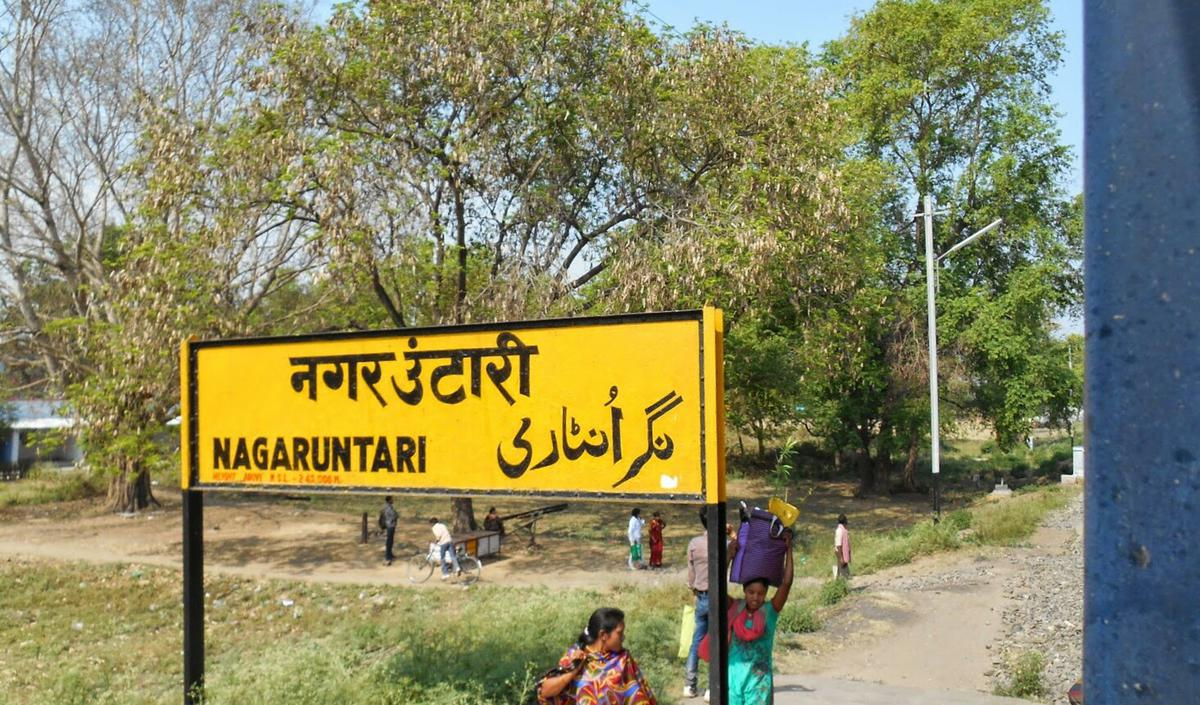
Railway Station Nagar Untari

Shree Banshidhar Nagar lies between 23°50′ and 24°8′ north latitude and between 83°55′ and 84°30′ east longitude. It is bordered on the north by Bihar and on the east by the Palamu district, on the south by Chhattisgarh and on the west by Uttar Pradesh. This covers an area of 5043.8 km² and has a population of 46079 approximately. The surrounding nearby villages and its distance from Shree Banshidhar Nagar are Kushdand 0.4 km, Chitvishram 1.5 km, Tharakiya 6 km, Puraini 1.6 km, Jangipur 3.4 km, Bhojpur 3.7 km, Garbandh 7.2 km, Bilaspur 7.8 km. The following table shows other railway stations and its distance from Shree banshidhar nagar Untari.

- Wyndhamganj - 10.4 km.
- Ramna - 11.7 km.
- Mahuariya - 20.4 km
- Meralgram - 23.2 km.
- Garhwa - 33.9 km.
- Garhwa Road - 48.7 km.
- Ranchi - 243.8 km.

The other nearest state capitals are Lucknow, Patna and Raipur. Shree Banshidhar Nagar is a village panchayat located in the Garhwa district of Jharkhand state, India. The latitude 24.28 and longitude 83.50 are the geocoordinate of the Shree Banshidhar Nagar. Distance of Lucknow from here is 258.5 km. The other surrounding state capitals are Patna 221.4 km, Lucknow 385.9 km, Bhubaneswar 507.1 km.

== History ==
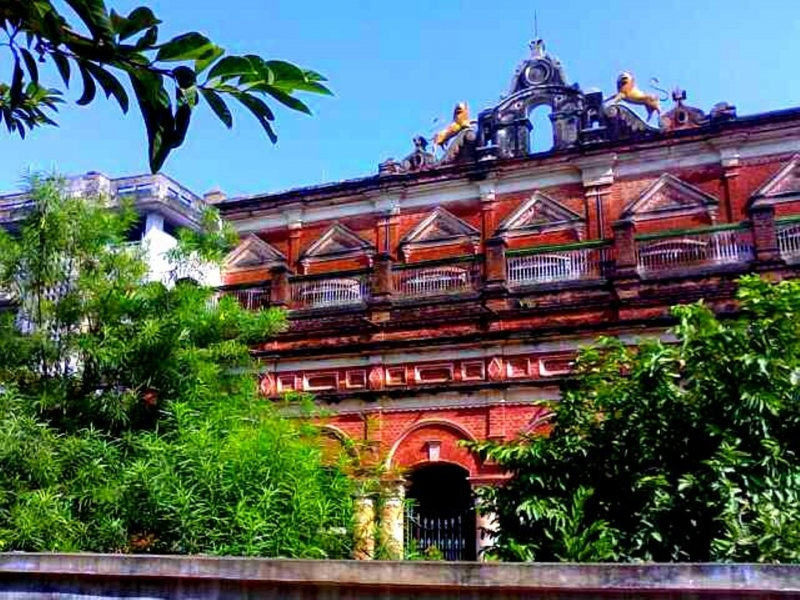
Princely State(Nagar Garh)

Shree Banshidhar Nagar (earlier named as Nagar Untari) is a Royal estate which was once ruled by the Deo Family. Bhaiya Rudra Pratap Deo was the last ruler to have ruled the place. Bhaiya Shankar pratap deo Son of Bhaiya Rudra Pratap Deo has 5 sons (Bade Raja) Raj Rajendra Pratap Deo, Dharmendra Pratap Deo, Mahendra Pratap Deo, Birender Pratap Deo and (Chote Raja) Anant Pratap Deo. Bhaiya Shankar Pratap Deo was a former minister in government of Bihar and multiple times member of legislative assembly. The family owns a magnificent Palace in the city which is very near to shree Bansidhar mandir and is a sight to view. The family still stays in the Palace and are actively involved in the state politics.

=== Festivals ===
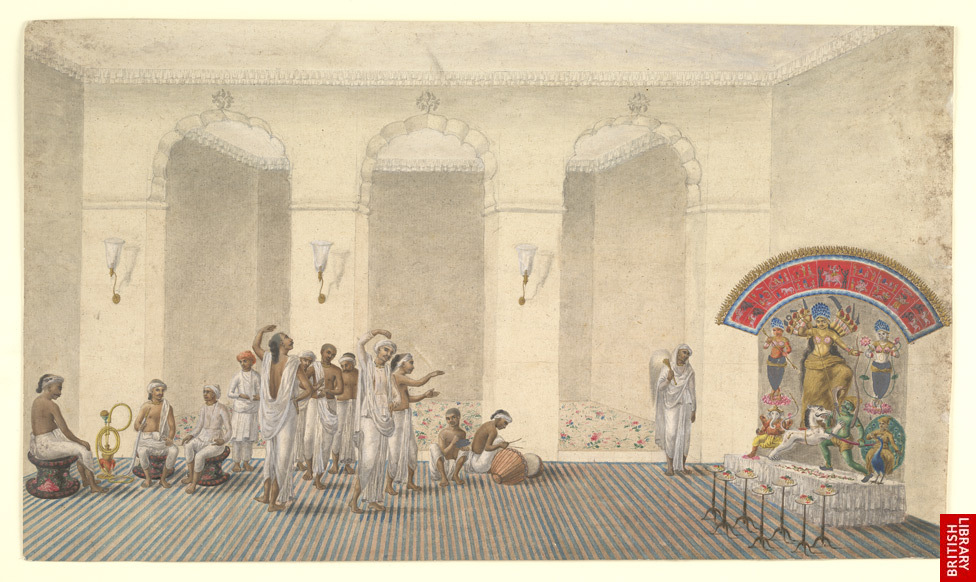
Durga Puja in Shree Banshidhar Nagar

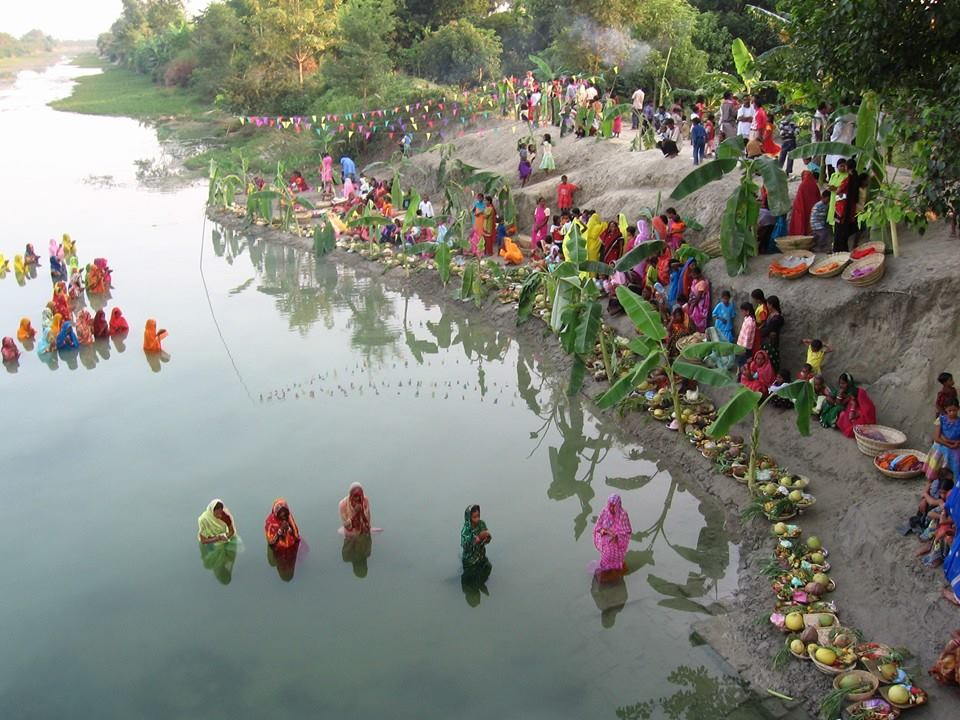
Chhath Puja in Shree Banshidhar Nagar

- Durga Puja
- Deepawali
- Holi
- Chhath Puja
- Ram Navami
- Id-ul fitr
- Eid al-Adha
- Moharram
- Rakhi
- Basant Panchami
- Makar Sankranti
- Shri Krishna Janmastmi

== Demographics ==
Religion in Sree Bansidhar Nagar CD block (2011)
Hinduism	82.75%
Islam	16.42%
Christianity	0.50%
Other or not stated	0.31%

According to the 2011 census of India, Sree Bansidhar Nagar CD block had a total population of 102,772, of which the entire population lived in rural areas. Sree Bansidhar Nagar had a sex ratio of 930 females per 1000 males and a literacy rate of 62.39%. Population in the age range 0–6 years was 18,426. Scheduled Castes numbered 26,415 (25.70%) and Scheduled Tribes numbered 12,003 (11.68%).

Languages in Sree Bansidhar Nagar CD block (2011)
1. Hindi (78.3%)
2. Magahi (12.0%)
3. Kurukh (3.44%)
4. Bhojpuri (2.79%)
5. Urdu (2.39%)
6. Others (1.02%)

== Facilities ==
- Market: A small market called Nagar bazar is situated in the middle of the block.
- Railway Station Nagar Untari is a famous railway station connected to Garhwa and Renukoot. Central government approved to rename this railway station on name of Lord Shri Krishna as Shree Banshidhar Nagar railway station .
- Hospital Trauma Centre Hospital Shree Banshidhar Nagar is one of the famous hospital at Shree Banshidhar Nagar.

== Tourists attractions ==
- Sukhaldari: This is a beautiful waterfall located in Dhurki, Shree Banshidhar Nagar. Many people come here for bathing on 14th and 15th January on Makar Sankranti festival.

It is specially known for "Makar Sankranti" festival.

- Shree Banshidhar Temple: This is a very old "Radha-Krishna" temple. This temple contains Gold Statues of God.This is also an attractive place to visit in Shree banshidhar nagar.
- Raja Pahari: This is a Shiva temple famously known for placed at Hilltop approximately 300 m (980 ft) above the ground level. There is a big pond at the foot hill called Raja Talab by locals.

== See also ==
- Garhwa district
- Palamu district
- Jharkhand
