= Sirhe, Garhwa =

Sirhe, Garhwa is a village in Garhwa district of Jharkhand state of India. Meral is admin block and Arangi is the Gram Panchayat of Sirhe Village.
