= Hoor, Garhwa =

Hoor, Garhwa is a village in Garhwa district of Jharkhand state of India.
