= Garhwa district =

Coordinates: 24°10′12″N 83°48′36″E

- District of Jharkhand
- Interactive map of Garhwa district
- Country: India
- State: Jharkhand
- Division: Palamu
- Headquarters: Garhwa

Government
  - DC: Shri Pashupati Nath Mishra (IAS)
  - Superintendent of Police: Shri Ashutosh Shekhar (IPS)

Area
  - Total: 4,044 km^{2} (1,561 sq mi)

Population (2011)
  - Total: 1,322,784
  - Density: 327.1/km^{2} (847.2/sq mi)

Demographics
  - Literacy: 60.33%
  - Sex ratio: 933
- Time zone: UTC+05:30 (IST)
- Major highways: NH 39, NH 343
- Website: http://garhwa.nic.in

Garhwa district is one of the twenty-four districts in the Indian state of Jharkhand. The Garhwa District is part of the Palamu division and has its administrative headquarters in Garhwa City.Garhwa district is located in west northern part of Jharkhand.

== History ==
The Garhwa District was established on 1 April 1991, from the former Palamu district, by separating its former Garhwa sub-division. It has been a part of the Red Corridor since 2011.

== Administration ==
The Garhwa district includes three subdivisions: Garhwa, Nagar Untari and Ranka, which are further divided into 20 blocks.

This district comprises a 156-gram panchayat and 916 villages.

It has three police sub-divisions: Garhwa, Shree Banshidhar Nagar and Ranka, with 18 police stations in Bhandaria, Ramkanda, Chinia, Dandai, Danda, Kandi, Bardiha, Ketar, Kharaundhi, Bhawnathpur, Dhurki, Ramna, Bishunpura, Garhwa, Manjhiaon Garhwa, Meral, Shree Banshidhar Nagar and Ranka.

Below is the list of blocks in Garhwa district:

1. Bhandaria
2. Danda
3. Garhwa
4. Manjhiaon
5. Ramkanda
6. Bishunpura
7. Bhawnathpur
8. Dandai
9. Kandi
10. Meral
11. Ramna
12. Ketar
13. Sagma
14. Chinia
15. Dhurki
16. Kharaundhi
17. Shree Banshidhar Nagar
18. Ranka
19. Bardiha
20. Bargarh

== Geography ==
The Garhwa district lies between 23° 60’ and 24° 39’ north latitude and 83° 22’ and 84° 00’ east longitude. It is bordered by the Son River to the north, the Palamau district of Jharkhand state to the east, the Balrampur district of Chhattisgarh state to the south, and the Sonbhadra district of Uttar Pradesh to the west.

== Economy ==
In 2006, the Indian government named Garhwa District one of the 250 most backward districts in the country, out of a total of 640. It is one of the 21 districts in Jharkhand state currently receiving funds from the Backward Regions Grant Fund Programme (BRGF).

== Transport ==
Garhwa is well-connected to roads and railways. Daily bus services are available from Ranchi and the much bigger districts of Jharkhand, Chhattisgarh and Bihar, but road connections in this district are not as high quality as others in the state. The district is connected to Rewa in Madhya Pradesh and Ranchi in Jharkhand by National Highway No. 39. There are 210 km of state highway, 55 km of national highway (NH-39) and 96.95 km of district roads. There is a total of 190 km link roads and corridors.

The nearest airport is located at Varanasi (140 km). Garhwa Railway Station is a major railhead of the Eastern Railway zone. National Highway 39 passes through Garhwa.

== Demographics ==
Historical population
Year	Pop.	±% p.a.
1901	185,046	—
1911	205,225	+1.04%
1921	218,858	+0.65%
1931	244,325	+1.11%
1941	272,376	+1.09%
1951	294,170	+0.77%
1961	358,877	+2.01%
1971	466,404	+2.66%
1981	606,759	+2.67%
1991	801,350	+2.82%
2001	1,035,464	+2.60%
2011	1,322,784	+2.48%

Religions in Garhwa district (2011)
Religion	Percent
Hinduism	83.50%
Islam	14.72%
Christianity	1.30%
Other or not stated	0.48%

According to the 2011 census, Garhwa district has a population of 1,322,784, roughly equal to the nation of Mauritius or the US state of New Hampshire. This number gives it a ranking of 368th in India, out of a total of 640. The district has a population density of 327 inhabitants per square kilometre (850/sq mi). Its population growth rate over the decade 2001-2011 was 27.71%. Garhwa has a sex ratio of 933 females for every 1,000 males, and a literacy rate of 60.33%. 5.27% of the population lives in urban areas. Scheduled Castes and Scheduled Tribes make up 24.19% and 15.56% of the population respectively.

Languages of Garhwa district (2011)
1. Hindi (54.5%)
2. Magahi (26.2%)
3. Bhojpuri (7.29%)
4. Nagpuri (5.39%)
5. Urdu (5.29%)
6. Others (1.27%)

At the time of the 2011 Census of India, 54.52% of the population in the district spoke Hindi, 26.24% Magahi, 7.29% Bhojpuri, 5.39% Sadri and 5.29% Urdu as their first language. Another 11,400 speak Kurukh.

== Politics ==
Garhwa has two assembly constituencies, Garhwa and Bhawanthpur. Both are part of Palamu Lok Sabha constituency, whose MP is Vishnu Dayal Ram from the BJP.

District	No.	Constituency	Name	Party	Alliance	Remarks	Garhwa	80	Garhwa	Satyendra Nath Tiwari	BJP	NDA
81	Bhawanathpur	Anant Pratap Deo		JMM	MGB		Garhwa					

== Towns and villages ==
- Garhwa
- Hoor
- Sirhe

== See also ==
- Palamu district
- Jharkhand
- Nagar Untari

Giridih
