= Palamu division =

Coordinates: 23.8°N 85.9°E

- Division of Jharkhand
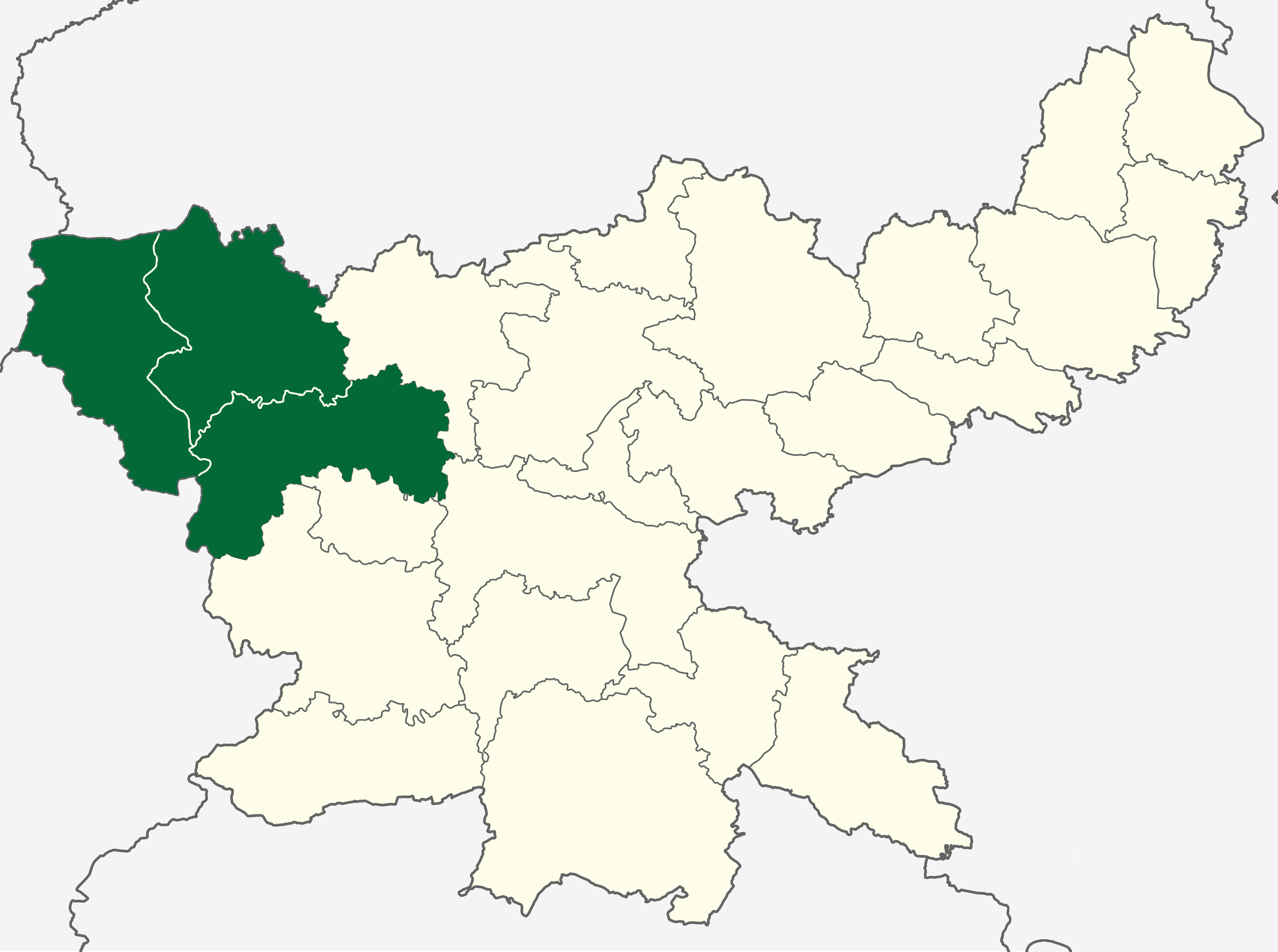
- Location of Palamu Division in Jharkhand
- Country: India
- State: Jharkhand
- Established: 1992
- Headquarters: Medininagar
- Districts: Palamu, Garhwa, Latehar

Government
  - Commissioner: Smt. Kumud Sahay (IAS)
  - DIG: Shri Kishore Kaushal (IPS)

Area
  - Total: 12,777 km^{2} (4,933 sq mi)

Population (2011)
  - Total: 3,989,631
  - Density: 312.25/km^{2} (808.73/sq mi)

Palamu division is one of the five divisions of Jharkhand state in eastern India. This division comprises three districts: Garhwa, Latehar and Palamu. Medininagar (formerly known as Daltonganj) town is the administrative headquarters of the division.

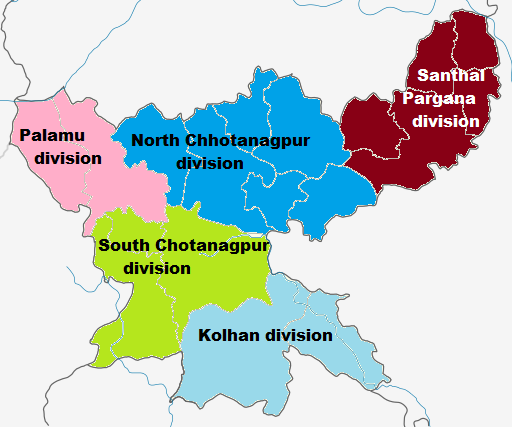
Palamu division in Northwest Jharkhand

== Languages ==
Languages in Palamu division (2011)
1. Hindi (57.3%)
2. Magahi (21.7%)
3. Sadri (6.89%)
4. Urdu (6.02%)
5. Kurukh (4.02%)
6. Bhojpuri (2.70%)
7. Others (1.36%)
