= Garhwa =

City in Jharkhand, India

- City
- Location in Jharkhand, India Garhwa (India)
- Coordinates: 24.18°N 83.82°E
- Country: India
- State: Jharkhand
- District: Garhwa district

Government
  - Type: Municipal governance in India
  - Body: Municipal Council Garhwa (Nagar Parishad)
- Elevation: 197 m (646 ft)

Population (2011)
  - Total: 46,059

Languages
  - Official: Hindi
- Time zone: UTC+5:30 (IST)
- PIN: 822114
- Vehicle registration: JH-14

Garhwa is a city and municipality in the Indian state of Jharkhand. It serves as the administrative headquarters of Garhwa district. Due to its proximity to the states of Uttar Pradesh, Bihar and Chhattisgarh, Garhwa functions as an important regional hub for transportation and trade. The nearby Garhwa Road (Rehla) railway junction connects the region to major Indian cities such as Delhi and Kolkata. The city also offers regular bus services to Ranchi, Ambikapur, Gaya, Varanasi, Patna, and other urban centers.

== History ==
Garhwa was originally a subdivision of the former Palamu district. On 1 April 1991, it was separated along with eight administrative blocks to form the independent Garhwa district.

Geographically, the district lies in the southwest of Palamu division, between 23°60′–24°39′ N latitude and 83°22′–84°00′ E longitude. It is bounded by the Sone River in the north; Palamu district and Chhattisgarh in the south; Palamu in the east; and Surguja (Chhattisgarh) and Sonbhadra (Uttar Pradesh) in the west.

Garhwa district consists of 20 administrative blocks: Banshidhar Nagar, Bhawanathpur, Meral, Ramna, Bardiha, Bhandaria, Chinia, Ranka, Ramkanda, Dhurki, Bishunpura, Manjhiaon, Kandi, Kharaundhi, Danda, Dandai, Bargarh, Ketar, Sagma, and Garhwa Sadar.

== Geography ==
Garhwa is located at 24.18°N 83.82°E and has an average elevation of 197 metres (646 ft).

The city is served by two railway stations:

- Garhwa Town (GHQ) – the primary local station;
- Garhwa Road Junction (GHD) – a major junction approximately 12–15 km from the city.

== Transport ==
=== Rail ===
Garhwa Road Junction provides long-distance connectivity to cities such as Ranchi, Delhi, Patna, Kolkata, Jabalpur, Lucknow, Kota and Gaya.

=== Road ===
Garhwa is connected via:

- NH 39 – linking Garhwa with Uttar Pradesh and major cities in Jharkhand
- NH 343 – linking Garhwa with Chhattisgarh

The Garhwa Interstate Bus Stand (Sonpurwa) handles over 200 buses daily to Bihar, Madhya Pradesh, Chhattisgarh, and various other districts of Jharkhand.

=== Air ===
The nearest airport is Birsa Munda Airport, Ranchi, located about 165 km away.

=== Helipad ===
The Birsa Munda Helipad Park near the district collectorate supports government and emergency helicopter services.

== Demographics ==
As per the 2011 Census of India, Garhwa had a population of 46,059.

- Males: 54%
- Females: 46%
- Literacy rate: 61% (male 69%, female 51%)
- Children under 6 years: 17%

== Languages ==
Languages spoken in Garhwa include:

- Hindi and English – official languages
- Magahi and Bhojpuri – widely spoken in rural regions
- Sadri, Nagpuri and Kurukh – used by tribal communities

== Religion ==
- Hinduism is the dominant religion.
- Islam is practiced by a significant urban population.
- Christianity and indigenous tribal faiths are present in smaller numbers.

== Urbanization ==
Garhwa district is largely rural, with Garhwa city serving as the main urban and administrative center. Agriculture remains the primary occupation for the majority of residents, although urban infrastructure in the city is steadily growing.

== Tourism ==
Major attractions in and around Garhwa include:

- Gadhdevi Temple – a prominent local pilgrimage site
- Satbahini Waterfall – popular since the British period
- Kali Temple (Kali Sthan) – associated with strong local devotion
- Ranka Raj Palace – filming location for Aaj Ka Robin Hood
- Khonhar Mandir, Gijna – an ancient temple of Lord Shiva

=== Anraj Dam ===
Located a few kilometers from Garhwa, the dam offers irrigation facilities and recreational boating services. It is being promoted as an eco-tourism destination.

=== Birsa Munda Helipad Park ===
Developed as both a helipad and a public park, it includes an open gym, walking tracks, gardens, and children's play areas.

=== Nilambar–Pitambar Park ===
A city park named after tribal freedom fighters Nilambar and Pitambar; used for walks, family visits, and civic events.

=== Football Stadium ===
A major venue for district tournaments, school competitions, and sports training.

=== Garhwa Town Hall ===
A central location for cultural events, public meetings, stage programs, and government gatherings.

== See also ==
- Garhwa district
- Garhwa railway station
- Palamu district
- Latehar district
- Nagar Untari
