= Kaithi =

Historical script used in Awadh and Bihar regions of Indian subcontinent

Kaithi Kayathi, Kayasthi 𑂍𑂶𑂟𑂲
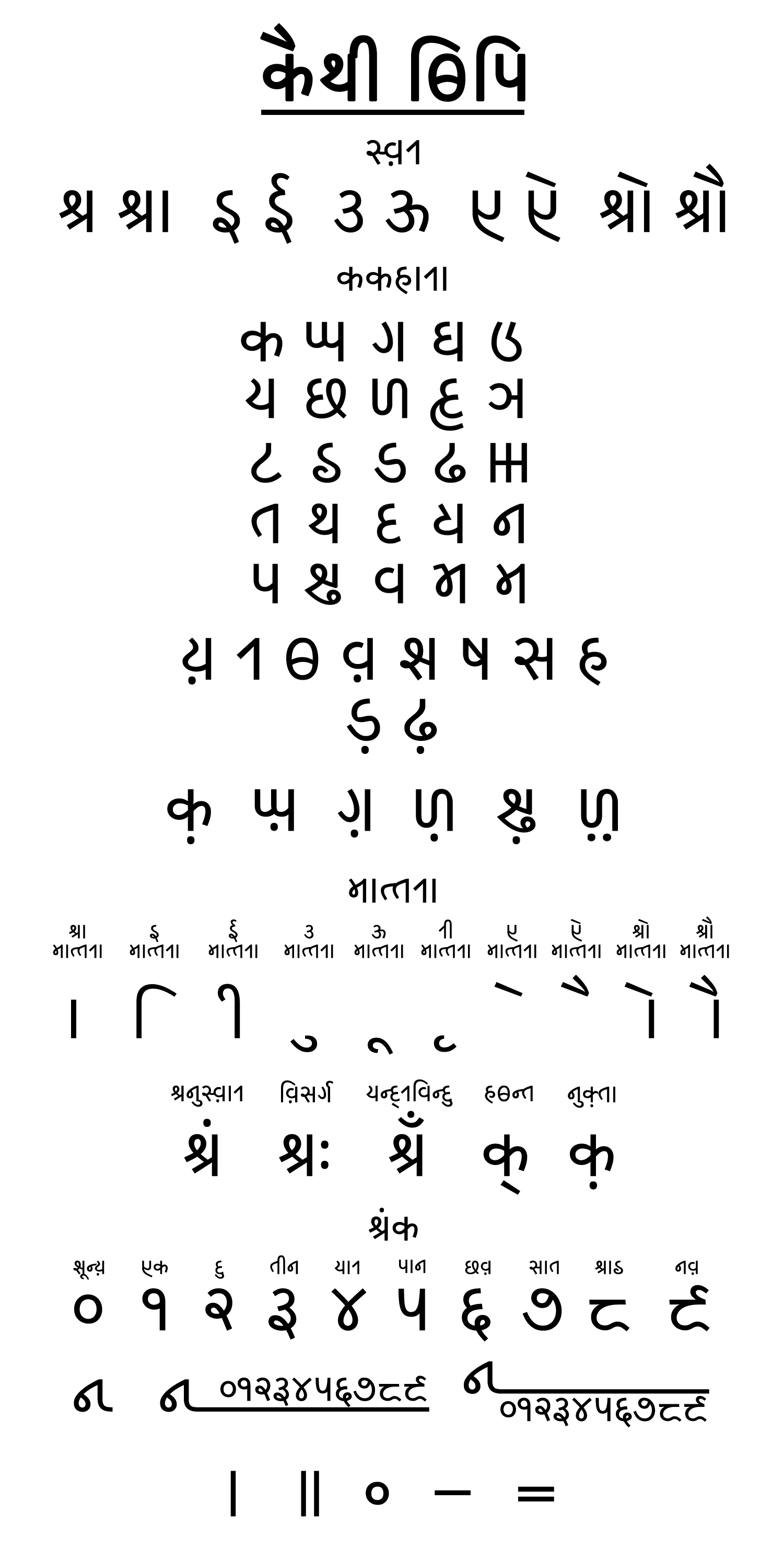
- Kaithī script chart divided into 10 vowels (𑂮𑂹𑂫𑂩), 35 Basic Consonants (𑂍𑂍𑂯𑂰𑂩𑂰), 6 foreign sounds, 10 Vowel diacritics (𑂧𑂰𑂞𑂹𑂞𑂩𑂰), 6 special diacritic marks, Kaithi numerals (𑂃𑂁𑂍), enumeration & number signs and 5 Punctuation marks.
- Script type: Abugida
- Period: c. 16th–mid 20th century
- Direction: Left-to-right
- Languages: Bhojpuri, Magahi, Maithili (Primary) Others: Angika; Awadhi; Bajjika; Hindustani; Nagpuri; Surjapuri

Related scripts
- Parent systems: Proto-Sinaitic alphabet: Phoenician alphabet; Aramaic alphabet; Brahmi; Gupta; Siddhaṃ; Nāgarī; Kaithi
- Child systems: Sylheti Nagari
- Sister systems: Devanagari; Nandinagari; Gujarati; Modi

ISO 15924
- ISO 15924: Kthi (317), Kaithi

Unicode
- Unicode alias: Kaithi
- Unicode range: U+11080–U+110CF

Kaithi (𑂍𑂶𑂟𑂲, Bhojpuri pronunciation: [kəɪ̯t̪ʰiː]), also called Kayathi (𑂍𑂨𑂟𑂲), Kayasthi (𑂍𑂰𑂨𑂮𑂹𑂟𑂲, Bhojpuri: [kəjəst̪ʰiː]), Kayastani, or Kaite Lipi (𑂍𑂰𑂅𑂞𑂵 𑂪𑂱𑂣𑂱) in Nepali, is a Brahmic script historically used across parts of Northern and Eastern India. It was prevalent in regions corresponding to modern-day Uttar Pradesh, Bihar, and Jharkhand. The script was primarily utilized for legal, administrative, and private records and was adapted for a variety of Indo-Aryan languages, including Angika, Awadhi, Bajjika, Bhojpuri, Hindustani, Maithili, Magahi, Nagpuri, and Surjapuri.

This table sets out the handwritten form of the vowels and consonants of the Kaithi script, as of the middle of the 19th century

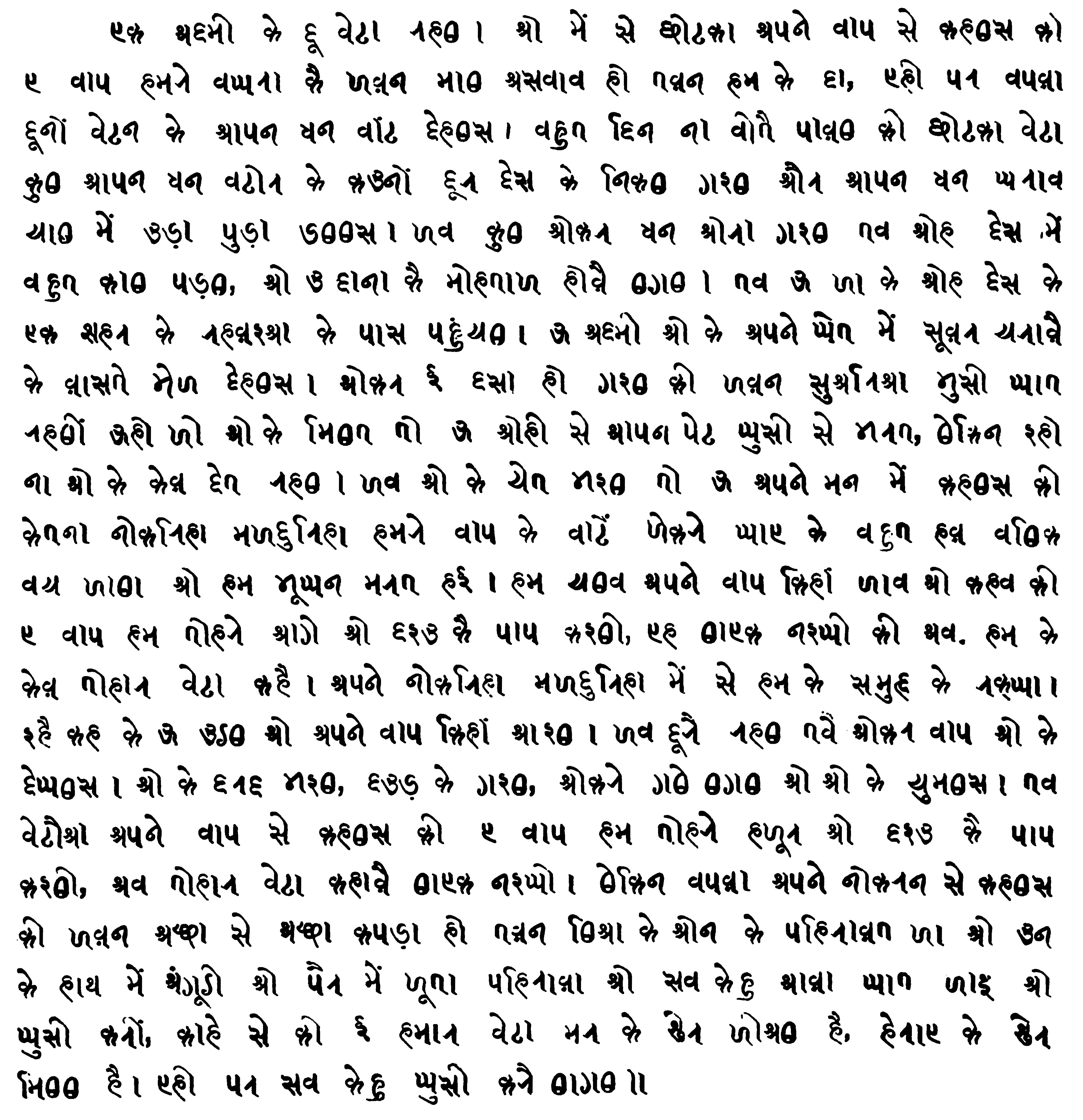
Bhojpuri story written in Kaithi script by Babu Rama Smaran Lal in 1898

== Etymology ==
The name Kaithi script is derived from the term Kayastha, a socio-professional group historically linked to writing, record-keeping and administration. This community served in royal courts and later in British colonial administration, maintaining revenue records, legal documents, title deeds, and general correspondence.

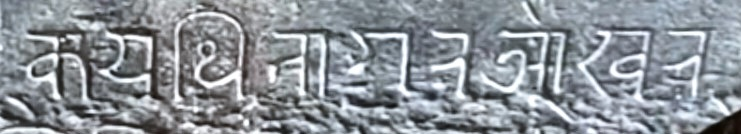
”Kayathināgara Ākhara” written in Newar script on Pratap Malla’s Inscription.

The Kaithi script is used in the multilingual stone inscription of King Pratap Malla, dated to 1654 CE. In this inscription, the name “Kayathināgara Ākhara” (Newar: 𑐎𑐫𑐠𑐶𑐣𑐵𑐐𑐬 𑐁𑐏𑐬, “Kayathinagari script”) is used to refer to this script in Newar language. This script is also known as Kaite Lipi in Nepali language.

== History ==
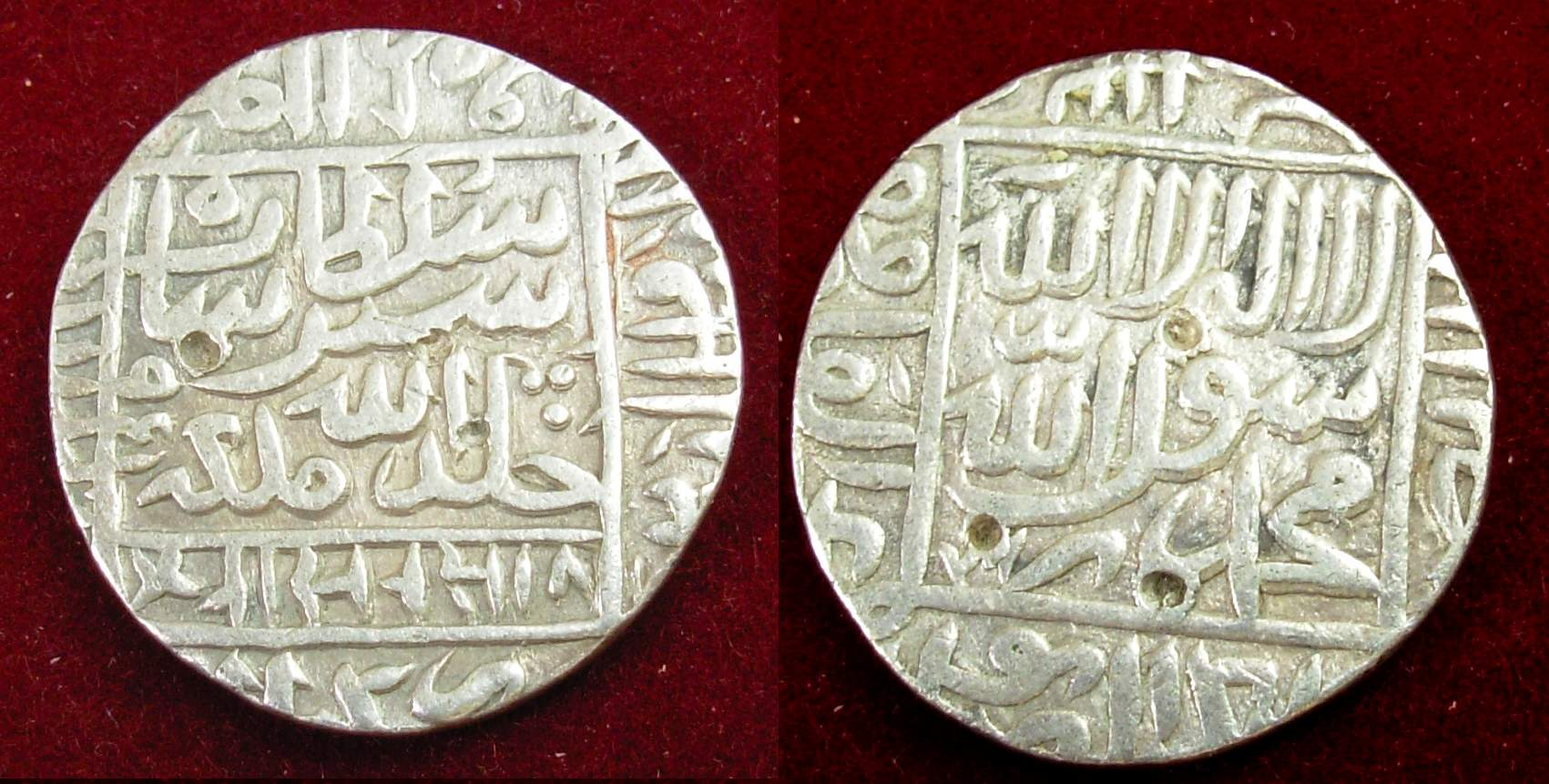
Kaithi script (left side bottom-most line) on the coins of Sher Shah Suri

Documents in Kaithi are traceable to at least the 16th century. The script was widely used during the Mughal period. In the 1880s, during the British Raj, the script was recognised as the official script of the law courts of Bihar. Kaithi was the most widely used script of North India west of Bengal. In 1854, 77,368 school primers were in Kaithi script, as compared to 25,151 in Devanagari and 24,302 in Mahajani. Among the three scripts widely used in the 'Hindi Belt', Kaithi was widely perceived to be neutral, as it was used by both Hindus and Muslims alike for day-to-day correspondence, financial and administrative activities, while Devanagari was used by Hindus and Persian script by Muslims for religious literature and education. This made Kaithi increasingly unfavorable to the more conservative and religiously inclined members of society who insisted on Devanagari-based and Persian-based transcription of Hindi dialects. As a result of their influence and due to the wide availability of Devanagari type as opposed to the incredibly large variability of Kaithi, Devanagari was promoted, particularly in the Northwest Provinces, which covers present-day Uttar Pradesh.

In the late 19th century, John Nesfield in Oudh, George Campbell of Inverneill in Bihar and a committee in Bengal all advocated for the use of Kaithi script in education. Many legal documents were written in Kaithi, and from 1950 to 1954 it was the official legal script of Bihar district courts. Present day Bihar courts struggle to read old Kaithi documents.

== Classes ==
On the basis of local variants Kaithi can be divided into three classes viz. Bhojpuri, Magahi and Trihuti.

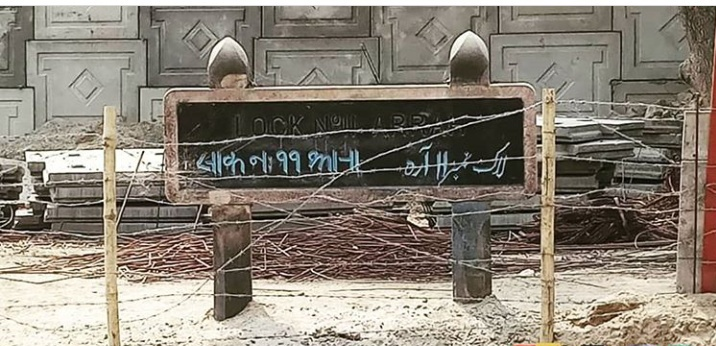
Signboard at Purbi Gumti, Arrah, with English (top), Bhojpuri Kaithi (bottom-left), and Urdu (bottom-right)

=== Bhojpuri ===
This was used in Bhojpuri speaking regions and was considered as the most legible style of Kaithi.

=== Magahi ===
Native to Magah or Magadh it lies between Bhojpuri and Trihuti.

=== Tirhuti ===
It was used in Maithili speaking regions and was considered as the most elegant style.

== Vowels ==
Kaithi vowels have independent (initial) and dependent (diacritic) forms:

Vowels
	Trans.	Shown with ⟨𑂍⟩	Trans.	Shown with ⟨𑂍⟩
Open	𑂃 a	𑂍	𑂄𑂰 ā	𑂍𑂰
Closed	𑂅𑂱 i	𑂍𑂱	𑂆𑂲 ī	𑂍𑂲
Closed rounded	𑂇𑂳 u	𑂍𑂳	𑂈𑂴 ū	𑂍𑂴
Mid	𑂉𑂵 e	𑂍𑂵	𑂊𑂶 ai	𑂍𑂶
Mid rounded	𑂋𑂷 o	𑂍𑂷	𑂌𑂸 au	𑂍𑂸

== Diacritics ==
Several diacritics are employed to change the meaning of letters:

Diacritic	Name	Function
𑂀	chandrabindu	A chandrabindu denotes nasalisation although it is not normally used with Kaithi.
𑂁	anusvara	An anusvara in Kaithi represents true vowel nasalisation. For example, 𑂍𑂁, kaṃ.
𑂂	visarga	Visarga is a Sanskrit holdover originally representing /h/. For example, 𑂍𑂂 kaḥ.
𑂹	halanta	A virama removes a consonant's inherent a and in some cases forms consonant clusters. Compare 𑂧𑂥 maba with 𑂧𑂹𑂥 mba.
𑂺	nuqta	A nuqta is used to extend letters to represent non-native sounds. For example, 𑂔 ja + nuqta = 𑂔𑂺, which represents Arabic zayin.

== Consonants ==
Consonants are called Kakahārā (𑂍𑂍𑂯𑂰𑂩𑂰) in Kaithi. The formal Sanskrit-based terminology Vyanjan (𑂫𑂹𑂨𑂖𑂹𑂔𑂢) is also used sometimes. All Kaithi consonants have an inherent /a/ vowel:

Kaithi Consonants (𑂍𑂍𑂯𑂰𑂩𑂰, Kakahārā)
𑂍 k IPA: /k/	𑂎 kh IPA: /kʰ/	𑂏 g IPA: /ɡ/	𑂐 gh IPA: /ɡʱ/	𑂑 ṅ IPA: /ŋ/
𑂒 c IPA: /c/	𑂓 ch IPA: /tʃʰ/	𑂔 j IPA: /ɟ/	𑂕 jh IPA: /dʒʱ/	𑂖 ñ IPA: /ɲ/
𑂗 ṭ IPA: /ʈ/	𑂘 ṭh IPA: /ʈʰ/	𑂙 ḍ IPA: /ɖ/	𑂛 ḍh IPA: /ɖʱ/	𑂝 ṇ IPA: /ɳ/
𑂞 t IPA: /t̪/	𑂟 th IPA: /t̪ʰ/	𑂠 d IPA: /d̪/	𑂡 dh IPA: /d̪ʱ/	𑂢 n IPA: /n/
𑂣 p IPA: /p/	𑂤 ph IPA: /pʰ/	𑂥 b IPA: /b/	𑂦 bh IPA: /bʱ/	𑂧 m IPA: /m/
𑂨 y IPA: /j/	𑂩 r IPA: /ɾ/	𑂪 l IPA: /l/	𑂫 v IPA: /ʋ/	𑂬 ś IPA: /ɕ/
	𑂭 ṣ IPA: /ʂ/	𑂮 s IPA: /s/	𑂯 h IPA: /ɦ/	

Bhojpuri Consonant Inventory
Stricture →	Occlusives				Sonorants					
Articulation →	Plosives & Affricates				Nasal	Approximant	Rhotic (Note: Bhojpuri rhotics are unique because they preserve a high frequency of /ɽʱ/, which has become rare or merged in other Indo-Aryan languages like Hindi. Furthermore, unlike the standard alveolar /ɾ/, Bhojpuri utilises them in distinct morphophonemic patterns, where flaps and taps alternate regularly to signal grammatical changes or emphasis.)		Fricative	
Voicing →	Voiceless		Voiced		Voiced		Voiced		Voiceless	Voiced
Aspiration →	Unaspirated	Aspirated	Unaspirated	Aspirated	Voiced		Unaspirated	Aspirated	Voiceless	Voiced
Velar	𑂍 k IPA: /k/	𑂎 kh IPA: /kʰ/	𑂏 g IPA: /ɡ/	𑂐 gh IPA: /ɡʱ/	𑂑 ṅ IPA: /ŋ/					
(Alveolo-) Palatal	𑂒 c IPA: /c/	𑂓 ch IPA: /tʃʰ/	𑂔 j IPA: /ɟ/	𑂕 jh IPA: /dʒʱ/	𑂖 ñ IPA: /ɲ/	𑂨 y IPA: /j/			𑂬 ś IPA: /ɕ/	
Retroflex	𑂗 ṭ IPA: /ʈ/	𑂘 ṭh IPA: /ʈʰ/	𑂙 ḍ IPA: /ɖ/	𑂛 ḍh IPA: /ɖʱ/	𑂝 ṇ IPA: /ɳ/		𑂚 ṛ IPA: /ɽ/ (Note: The letter 𑂚 is made using the 𑂙 with the (𑂺) mark.)	𑂜 ṛh IPA: /ɽʱ/ (Note: The letter 𑂜 is made using the 𑂛 with the (𑂺) mark.)	𑂭 ṣ IPA: /ʂ/	
(Denti-) Alveolar	𑂞 t IPA: /t̪/	𑂟 th IPA: /t̪ʰ/	𑂠 d IPA: /d̪/	𑂡 dh IPA: /d̪ʱ/	𑂢 n IPA: /n/	𑂪 l IPA: /l/	𑂩 r IPA: /ɾ/	𑂩𑂹𑂯 rh IPA: /ɾʱ/ (Note: There is no universal way of denoting this phoneme. Some scribes used 𑂩𑂹𑂯 in old texts, while others used 𑂩 without the (𑂹) mark, while others wrote an unligated conjunct with a virama (𑂩𑂹‌𑂯). The reader infers the phoneme from context.)	𑂮 s IPA: /s/	
Labial	𑂣 p IPA: /p/	𑂤 ph IPA: /pʰ/	𑂥 b IPA: /b/	𑂦 bh IPA: /bʱ/	𑂧 m IPA: /m/	𑂫 v IPA: /ʋ/				
Glottal										𑂯 h IPA: /ɦ/

=== Consonant Ligatures ===
In the Kaithi script, conjunct consonant ligatures called Sanyuktakshar ( 𑂮𑂁𑂨𑂳𑂍𑂹𑂞𑂰𑂓𑂩, romanised: Sanyuktachhar ), are generally less complex and standardised than those found in Devanagari, because of the morphology of the languages Kaithi is written in. In spoken Bhojpuri, Magadhi, Maithili and Awadhi, there is significant simplification of consonant clusters through metathesis. Complex phonemes like /ksha/ (Dev: क्ष / Kthi: 𑂍𑂹𑂭 ) from Sanskrit are instead replaced by simpler phonemes like /cha/ (𑂓).

- Example 1: The word karma (Dev: कर्म) becomes karam (Kthi: 𑂍𑂩𑂧)
- Example 2: The word Sanyuktakshar (Dev: संयुक्ताक्षर) becomes Sanyuktachhar (Kthi: 𑂮𑂁𑂨𑂳𑂍𑂹𑂞𑂰𑂓𑂩)

The second reason is Kaithi's orthographic nature. Because Kaithi was optimised by removing the shirorekha, to efficiently and rapidly transcribe information through continuous rapid strokes, historically, scribes have often avoided complex conjunct forms. Instead, they preferred to write the consonants sequentially, using an explicit virama (𑂹) to suppress the inherent vowel. However, ligated forms also exist, particularly in the Tirhuti class of Kaithi.

Example: The conjunct mba can be rendered as:

- 𑂧 + 𑂹 + 𑂥 → 𑂧𑂹‌𑂥

the same conjunct mba can be ligated as:

- 𑂧 + 𑂹 + 𑂥 → 𑂧𑂹𑂥

When ligatures are employed, they typically follow two primary structural patterns:

- Vertical Stacking: The trailing consonant is written directly below the leading consonant. This method is predominantly used for homorganic nasals and geminates.

𑂍𑂹𑂍 kka IPA: /kː/	𑂣𑂹𑂞 pta IPA: /pt̪a/

- Half-Forms: The distinctive right vertical stem of the leading consonant is removed, and the remaining left half is joined horizontally to the subsequent consonant

𑂧𑂹𑂥 mba IPA: /mba/	𑂮𑂹𑂞 sta IPA: /st̪a/	𑂍𑂹𑂭 ksha IPA: /kʂa/

==== Common Double Consonants ====
Geminates are among the most frequently encountered ligatures in historical Kaithi manuscripts. They can be ligated or unligated, depending upon the scribe.

𑂍𑂹𑂍 kka IPA: /kː/	𑂞𑂹𑂞 tta IPA: /t̪ː/	𑂢𑂹𑂢 nna IPA: /nː/	𑂧𑂹𑂧 mma IPA: /mː/	𑂪𑂹𑂪 lla IPA: /lː/

==== Rhotic Ligation ====
Similar to Devanagari, when the consonant /ɾa/ (𑂩) is part of a conjunct, it takes on a specialised reduced shape depending on its position in the consonant cluster.

- Initial consonant (Repha): When /ɾa/ precedes another consonant like in /ɾma/, it is written as a repha (𑂩𑂵𑂤). In Kaithi, the repha is a small, curved stroke placed above and slightly to the right of the following consonant. Because Kaithi was often written rapidly without a shirorekha, the exact placement of the repha could float somewhat loosely above the character it modified.

𑂩𑂹𑂧 rma IPA: /ɾma/	𑂩𑂹𑂟 rtha IPA: /ɾt̪ʰ/	𑂩𑂹𑂏 rg IPA: /ɾɡ/

- Second consonant (Rakar): When /ɾa/ follows another consonant like in /pɾa/, it is written as a rakar (𑂩𑂍𑂰𑂩). For characters with a vertical right stem like /pa/ (𑂣) or /ka/ (𑂍), the rakar is usually a short, diagonal stroke attached to the lower half of that stem. For characters lacking a straight right stem like /ʈa/ (𑂗), the rakar often attaches to the bottom of the letterform.

𑂍𑂹𑂩 kra IPA: /kɾa/	𑂣𑂹𑂩 pra IPA: /pɾa/	𑂞𑂹𑂩 tra IPA: /t̪ɾa/	𑂗𑂹𑂩 ṭra IPA: /ʈɾa/

Below is a comprehensive table of all 1225 possible biconsonantal Kaithi conjunct clusters. The derived characters /ɽ/ (𑂚) and /ɽʱ/ (𑂜) have also been included. Some of the ligated conjuncts may not be viable combinations in any language.

All Kaithi Sanyuktakshar (𑂮𑂁𑂨𑂳𑂍𑂹𑂞𑂰𑂓𑂩) (Note: Grierson classifies in Plate III . into Strong, Weak and Mixed conjuncts. The class of Kaithi is Tirhuta, with more vertically stacked ligatures.)
Consonants	𑂍	𑂎	𑂏	𑂐	𑂑	𑂒	𑂓	𑂔	𑂕	𑂖	𑂗	𑂘	𑂙	𑂛	𑂝	𑂞	𑂟	𑂠	𑂡	𑂢	𑂣	𑂤	𑂥	𑂦	𑂧	𑂨	𑂩 (Note: This letter acts as rakar (𑂩𑂍𑂰𑂩) diacritic when it is second in a conjunct.)	𑂪	𑂫	𑂬	𑂭	𑂮	𑂯	𑂚	𑂜
𑂍	𑂍𑂹𑂍	𑂍𑂹𑂎	𑂍𑂹𑂏	𑂍𑂹𑂐	𑂍𑂹𑂑	𑂍𑂹𑂒	𑂍𑂹𑂓	𑂍𑂹𑂔	𑂍𑂹𑂕	𑂍𑂹𑂖	𑂍𑂹𑂗	𑂍𑂹𑂘	𑂍𑂹𑂙	𑂍𑂹𑂛	𑂍𑂹𑂝	𑂍𑂹𑂞	𑂍𑂹𑂟	𑂍𑂹𑂠	𑂍𑂹𑂡	𑂍𑂹𑂢	𑂍𑂹𑂣	𑂍𑂹𑂤	𑂍𑂹𑂥	𑂍𑂹𑂦	𑂍𑂹𑂧	𑂍𑂹𑂨	𑂍𑂹𑂩	𑂍𑂹𑂪	𑂍𑂹𑂫	𑂍𑂹𑂬	𑂍𑂹𑂭	𑂍𑂹𑂮	𑂍𑂹𑂯	𑂍𑂹𑂚	𑂍𑂹𑂜
𑂎	𑂎𑂹𑂍	𑂎𑂹𑂎	𑂎𑂹𑂏	𑂎𑂹𑂐	𑂎𑂹𑂑	𑂎𑂹𑂒	𑂎𑂹𑂓	𑂎𑂹𑂔	𑂎𑂹𑂕	𑂎𑂹𑂖	𑂎𑂹𑂗	𑂎𑂹𑂘	𑂎𑂹𑂙	𑂎𑂹𑂛	𑂎𑂹𑂝	𑂎𑂹𑂞	𑂎𑂹𑂟	𑂎𑂹𑂠	𑂎𑂹𑂡	𑂎𑂹𑂢	𑂎𑂹𑂣	𑂎𑂹𑂤	𑂎𑂹𑂥	𑂎𑂹𑂦	𑂎𑂹𑂧	𑂎𑂹𑂨	𑂎𑂹𑂩	𑂎𑂹𑂪	𑂎𑂹𑂫	𑂎𑂹𑂬	𑂎𑂹𑂭	𑂎𑂹𑂮	𑂎𑂹𑂯	𑂎𑂹𑂚	𑂎𑂹𑂜
𑂏	𑂏𑂹𑂍	𑂏𑂹𑂎	𑂏𑂹𑂏	𑂏𑂹𑂐	𑂏𑂹𑂑	𑂏𑂹𑂒	𑂏𑂹𑂓	𑂏𑂹𑂔	𑂏𑂹𑂕	𑂏𑂹𑂖	𑂏𑂹𑂗	𑂏𑂹𑂘	𑂏𑂹𑂙	𑂏𑂹𑂛	𑂏𑂹𑂝	𑂏𑂹𑂞	𑂏𑂹𑂟	𑂏𑂹𑂠	𑂏𑂹𑂡	𑂏𑂹𑂢	𑂏𑂹𑂣	𑂏𑂹𑂤	𑂏𑂹𑂥	𑂏𑂹𑂦	𑂏𑂹𑂧	𑂏𑂹𑂨	𑂏𑂹𑂩	𑂏𑂹𑂪	𑂏𑂹𑂫	𑂏𑂹𑂬	𑂏𑂹𑂭	𑂏𑂹𑂮	𑂏𑂹𑂯	𑂏𑂹𑂚	𑂏𑂹𑂜
𑂐	𑂐𑂹𑂍	𑂐𑂹𑂎	𑂐𑂹𑂏	𑂐𑂹𑂐	𑂐𑂹𑂑	𑂐𑂹𑂒	𑂐𑂹𑂓	𑂐𑂹𑂔	𑂐𑂹𑂕	𑂐𑂹𑂖	𑂐𑂹𑂗	𑂐𑂹𑂘	𑂐𑂹𑂙	𑂐𑂹𑂛	𑂐𑂹𑂝	𑂐𑂹𑂞	𑂐𑂹𑂟	𑂐𑂹𑂠	𑂐𑂹𑂡	𑂐𑂹𑂢	𑂐𑂹𑂣	𑂐𑂹𑂤	𑂐𑂹𑂥	𑂐𑂹𑂦	𑂐𑂹𑂧	𑂐𑂹𑂨	𑂐𑂹𑂩	𑂐𑂹𑂪	𑂐𑂹𑂫	𑂐𑂹𑂬	𑂐𑂹𑂭	𑂐𑂹𑂮	𑂐𑂹𑂯	𑂐𑂹𑂚	𑂐𑂹𑂜
𑂑	𑂑𑂹𑂍	𑂑𑂹𑂎	𑂑𑂹𑂏	𑂑𑂹𑂐	𑂑𑂹𑂑	𑂑𑂹𑂒	𑂑𑂹𑂓	𑂑𑂹𑂔	𑂑𑂹𑂕	𑂑𑂹𑂖	𑂑𑂹𑂗	𑂑𑂹𑂘	𑂑𑂹𑂙	𑂑𑂹𑂛	𑂑𑂹𑂝	𑂑𑂹𑂞	𑂑𑂹𑂟	𑂑𑂹𑂠	𑂑𑂹𑂡	𑂑𑂹𑂢	𑂑𑂹𑂣	𑂑𑂹𑂤	𑂑𑂹𑂥	𑂑𑂹𑂦	𑂑𑂹𑂧	𑂑𑂹𑂨	𑂑𑂹𑂩	𑂑𑂹𑂪	𑂑𑂹𑂫	𑂑𑂹𑂬	𑂑𑂹𑂭	𑂑𑂹𑂮	𑂑𑂹𑂯	𑂑𑂹𑂚	𑂑𑂹𑂜
𑂒	𑂒𑂹𑂍	𑂒𑂹𑂎	𑂒𑂹𑂏	𑂒𑂹𑂐	𑂒𑂹𑂑	𑂒𑂹𑂒	𑂒𑂹𑂓	𑂒𑂹𑂔	𑂒𑂹𑂕	𑂒𑂹𑂖	𑂒𑂹𑂗	𑂒𑂹𑂘	𑂒𑂹𑂙	𑂒𑂹𑂛	𑂒𑂹𑂝	𑂒𑂹𑂞	𑂒𑂹𑂟	𑂒𑂹𑂠	𑂒𑂹𑂡	𑂒𑂹𑂢	𑂒𑂹𑂣	𑂒𑂹𑂤	𑂒𑂹𑂥	𑂒𑂹𑂦	𑂒𑂹𑂧	𑂒𑂹𑂨	𑂒𑂹𑂩	𑂒𑂹𑂪	𑂒𑂹𑂫	𑂒𑂹𑂬	𑂒𑂹𑂭	𑂒𑂹𑂮	𑂒𑂹𑂯	𑂒𑂹𑂚	𑂒𑂹𑂜
𑂓	𑂓𑂹𑂍	𑂓𑂹𑂎	𑂓𑂹𑂏	𑂓𑂹𑂐	𑂓𑂹𑂑	𑂓𑂹𑂒	𑂓𑂹𑂓	𑂓𑂹𑂔	𑂓𑂹𑂕	𑂓𑂹𑂖	𑂓𑂹𑂗	𑂓𑂹𑂘	𑂓𑂹𑂙	𑂓𑂹𑂛	𑂓𑂹𑂝	𑂓𑂹𑂞	𑂓𑂹𑂟	𑂓𑂹𑂠	𑂓𑂹𑂡	𑂓𑂹𑂢	𑂓𑂹𑂣	𑂓𑂹𑂤	𑂓𑂹𑂥	𑂓𑂹𑂦	𑂓𑂹𑂧	𑂓𑂹𑂨	𑂓𑂹𑂩	𑂓𑂹𑂪	𑂓𑂹𑂫	𑂓𑂹𑂬	𑂓𑂹𑂭	𑂓𑂹𑂮	𑂓𑂹𑂯	𑂓𑂹𑂚	𑂓𑂹𑂜
𑂔	𑂔𑂹𑂍	𑂔𑂹𑂎	𑂔𑂹𑂏	𑂔𑂹𑂐	𑂔𑂹𑂑	𑂔𑂹𑂒	𑂔𑂹𑂓	𑂔𑂹𑂔	𑂔𑂹𑂕	𑂔𑂹𑂖	𑂔𑂹𑂗	𑂔𑂹𑂘	𑂔𑂹𑂙	𑂔𑂹𑂛	𑂔𑂹𑂝	𑂔𑂹𑂞	𑂔𑂹𑂟	𑂔𑂹𑂠	𑂔𑂹𑂡	𑂔𑂹𑂢	𑂔𑂹𑂣	𑂔𑂹𑂤	𑂔𑂹𑂥	𑂔𑂹𑂦	𑂔𑂹𑂧	𑂔𑂹𑂨	𑂔𑂹𑂩	𑂔𑂹𑂪	𑂔𑂹𑂫	𑂔𑂹𑂬	𑂔𑂹𑂭	𑂔𑂹𑂮	𑂔𑂹𑂯	𑂔𑂹𑂚	𑂔𑂹𑂜
𑂕 (Note: This letter lacks ligated forms as the initial consonant in both Unicode and in Grierson's Plate III.)	𑂕𑂹𑂍	𑂕𑂹𑂎	𑂕𑂹𑂏	𑂕𑂹𑂐	𑂕𑂹𑂑	𑂕𑂹𑂒	𑂕𑂹𑂓	𑂕𑂹𑂔	𑂕𑂹𑂕	𑂕𑂹𑂖	𑂕𑂹𑂗	𑂕𑂹𑂘	𑂕𑂹𑂙	𑂕𑂹𑂛	𑂕𑂹𑂝	𑂕𑂹𑂞	𑂕𑂹𑂟	𑂕𑂹𑂠	𑂕𑂹𑂡	𑂕𑂹𑂢	𑂕𑂹𑂣	𑂕𑂹𑂤	𑂕𑂹𑂥	𑂕𑂹𑂦	𑂕𑂹𑂧	𑂕𑂹𑂨	𑂕𑂹𑂩	𑂕𑂹𑂪	𑂕𑂹𑂫	𑂕𑂹𑂬	𑂕𑂹𑂭	𑂕𑂹𑂮	𑂕𑂹𑂯	𑂕𑂹𑂚	𑂕𑂹𑂜
𑂖	𑂖𑂹𑂍	𑂖𑂹𑂎	𑂖𑂹𑂏	𑂖𑂹𑂐	𑂖𑂹𑂑	𑂖𑂹𑂒	𑂖𑂹𑂓	𑂖𑂹𑂔	𑂖𑂹𑂕	𑂖𑂹𑂖	𑂖𑂹𑂗	𑂖𑂹𑂘	𑂖𑂹𑂙	𑂖𑂹𑂛	𑂖𑂹𑂝	𑂖𑂹𑂞	𑂖𑂹𑂟	𑂖𑂹𑂠	𑂖𑂹𑂡	𑂖𑂹𑂢	𑂖𑂹𑂣	𑂖𑂹𑂤	𑂖𑂹𑂥	𑂖𑂹𑂦	𑂖𑂹𑂧	𑂖𑂹𑂨	𑂖𑂹𑂩	𑂖𑂹𑂪	𑂖𑂹𑂫	𑂖𑂹𑂬	𑂖𑂹𑂭	𑂖𑂹𑂮	𑂖𑂹𑂯	𑂖𑂹𑂚	𑂖𑂹𑂜
𑂗 (Note: This retroflex letter lacks ligated forms as the initial consonant in both Unicode and in Grierson's Plate III.)	𑂗𑂹𑂍	𑂗𑂹𑂎	𑂗𑂹𑂏	𑂗𑂹𑂐	𑂗𑂹𑂑	𑂗𑂹𑂒	𑂗𑂹𑂓	𑂗𑂹𑂔	𑂗𑂹𑂕	𑂗𑂹𑂖	𑂗𑂹𑂗	𑂗𑂹𑂘	𑂗𑂹𑂙	𑂗𑂹𑂛	𑂗𑂹𑂝	𑂗𑂹𑂞	𑂗𑂹𑂟	𑂗𑂹𑂠	𑂗𑂹𑂡	𑂗𑂹𑂢	𑂗𑂹𑂣	𑂗𑂹𑂤	𑂗𑂹𑂥	𑂗𑂹𑂦	𑂗𑂹𑂧	𑂗𑂹𑂨	𑂗𑂹𑂩	𑂗𑂹𑂪	𑂗𑂹𑂫	𑂗𑂹𑂬	𑂗𑂹𑂭	𑂗𑂹𑂮	𑂗𑂹𑂯	𑂗𑂹𑂚	𑂗𑂹𑂜
𑂘	𑂘𑂹𑂍	𑂘𑂹𑂎	𑂘𑂹𑂏	𑂘𑂹𑂐	𑂘𑂹𑂑	𑂘𑂹𑂒	𑂘𑂹𑂓	𑂘𑂹𑂔	𑂘𑂹𑂕	𑂘𑂹𑂖	𑂘𑂹𑂗	𑂘𑂹𑂘	𑂘𑂹𑂙	𑂘𑂹𑂛	𑂘𑂹𑂝	𑂘𑂹𑂞	𑂘𑂹𑂟	𑂘𑂹𑂠	𑂘𑂹𑂡	𑂘𑂹𑂢	𑂘𑂹𑂣	𑂘𑂹𑂤	𑂘𑂹𑂥	𑂘𑂹𑂦	𑂘𑂹𑂧	𑂘𑂹𑂨	𑂘𑂹𑂩	𑂘𑂹𑂪	𑂘𑂹𑂫	𑂘𑂹𑂬	𑂘𑂹𑂭	𑂘𑂹𑂮	𑂘𑂹𑂯	𑂘𑂹𑂚	𑂘𑂹𑂜
𑂙	𑂙𑂹𑂍	𑂙𑂹𑂎	𑂙𑂹𑂏	𑂙𑂹𑂐	𑂙𑂹𑂑	𑂙𑂹𑂒	𑂙𑂹𑂓	𑂙𑂹𑂔	𑂙𑂹𑂕	𑂙𑂹𑂖	𑂙𑂹𑂗	𑂙𑂹𑂘	𑂙𑂹𑂙	𑂙𑂹𑂛	𑂙𑂹𑂝	𑂙𑂹𑂞	𑂙𑂹𑂟	𑂙𑂹𑂠	𑂙𑂹𑂡	𑂙𑂹𑂢	𑂙𑂹𑂣	𑂙𑂹𑂤	𑂙𑂹𑂥	𑂙𑂹𑂦	𑂙𑂹𑂧	𑂙𑂹𑂨	𑂙𑂹𑂩	𑂙𑂹𑂪	𑂙𑂹𑂫	𑂙𑂹𑂬	𑂙𑂹𑂭	𑂙𑂹𑂮	𑂙𑂹𑂯	𑂙𑂹𑂚	𑂙𑂹𑂜
𑂛	𑂛𑂹𑂍	𑂛𑂹𑂎	𑂛𑂹𑂏	𑂛𑂹𑂐	𑂛𑂹𑂑	𑂛𑂹𑂒	𑂛𑂹𑂓	𑂛𑂹𑂔	𑂛𑂹𑂕	𑂛𑂹𑂖	𑂛𑂹𑂗	𑂛𑂹𑂘	𑂛𑂹𑂙	𑂛𑂹𑂛	𑂛𑂹𑂝	𑂛𑂹𑂞	𑂛𑂹𑂟	𑂛𑂹𑂠	𑂛𑂹𑂡	𑂛𑂹𑂢	𑂛𑂹𑂣	𑂛𑂹𑂤	𑂛𑂹𑂥	𑂛𑂹𑂦	𑂛𑂹𑂧	𑂛𑂹𑂨	𑂛𑂹𑂩	𑂛𑂹𑂪	𑂛𑂹𑂫	𑂛𑂹𑂬	𑂛𑂹𑂭	𑂛𑂹𑂮	𑂛𑂹𑂯	𑂛𑂹𑂚	𑂛𑂹𑂜
𑂝	𑂝𑂹𑂍	𑂝𑂹𑂎	𑂝𑂹𑂏	𑂝𑂹𑂐	𑂝𑂹𑂑	𑂝𑂹𑂒	𑂝𑂹𑂓	𑂝𑂹𑂔	𑂝𑂹𑂕	𑂝𑂹𑂖	𑂝𑂹𑂗	𑂝𑂹𑂘	𑂝𑂹𑂙	𑂝𑂹𑂛	𑂝𑂹𑂝	𑂝𑂹𑂞	𑂝𑂹𑂟	𑂝𑂹𑂠	𑂝𑂹𑂡	𑂝𑂹𑂢	𑂝𑂹𑂣	𑂝𑂹𑂤	𑂝𑂹𑂥	𑂝𑂹𑂦	𑂝𑂹𑂧	𑂝𑂹𑂨	𑂝𑂹𑂩	𑂝𑂹𑂪	𑂝𑂹𑂫	𑂝𑂹𑂬	𑂝𑂹𑂭	𑂝𑂹𑂮	𑂝𑂹𑂯	𑂝𑂹𑂚	𑂝𑂹𑂜
𑂞	𑂞𑂹𑂍	𑂞𑂹𑂎	𑂞𑂹𑂏	𑂞𑂹𑂐	𑂞𑂹𑂑	𑂞𑂹𑂒	𑂞𑂹𑂓	𑂞𑂹𑂔	𑂞𑂹𑂕	𑂞𑂹𑂖	𑂞𑂹𑂗	𑂞𑂹𑂘	𑂞𑂹𑂙	𑂞𑂹𑂛	𑂞𑂹𑂝	𑂞𑂹𑂞	𑂞𑂹𑂟	𑂞𑂹𑂠	𑂞𑂹𑂡	𑂞𑂹𑂢	𑂞𑂹𑂣	𑂞𑂹𑂤	𑂞𑂹𑂥	𑂞𑂹𑂦	𑂞𑂹𑂧	𑂞𑂹𑂨	𑂞𑂹𑂩	𑂞𑂹𑂪	𑂞𑂹𑂫	𑂞𑂹𑂬	𑂞𑂹𑂭	𑂞𑂹𑂮	𑂞𑂹𑂯	𑂞𑂹𑂚	𑂞𑂹𑂜
𑂟	𑂟𑂹𑂍	𑂟𑂹𑂎	𑂟𑂹𑂏	𑂟𑂹𑂐	𑂟𑂹𑂑	𑂟𑂹𑂒	𑂟𑂹𑂓	𑂟𑂹𑂔	𑂟𑂹𑂕	𑂟𑂹𑂖	𑂟𑂹𑂗	𑂟𑂹𑂘	𑂟𑂹𑂙	𑂟𑂹𑂛	𑂟𑂹𑂝	𑂟𑂹𑂞	𑂟𑂹𑂟	𑂟𑂹𑂠	𑂟𑂹𑂡	𑂟𑂹𑂢	𑂟𑂹𑂣	𑂟𑂹𑂤	𑂟𑂹𑂥	𑂟𑂹𑂦	𑂟𑂹𑂧	𑂟𑂹𑂨	𑂟𑂹𑂩	𑂟𑂹𑂪	𑂟𑂹𑂫	𑂟𑂹𑂬	𑂟𑂹𑂭	𑂟𑂹𑂮	𑂟𑂹𑂯	𑂟𑂹𑂚	𑂟𑂹𑂜
𑂠	𑂠𑂹𑂍	𑂠𑂹𑂎	𑂠𑂹𑂏	𑂠𑂹𑂐	𑂠𑂹𑂑	𑂠𑂹𑂒	𑂠𑂹𑂓	𑂠𑂹𑂔	𑂠𑂹𑂕	𑂠𑂹𑂖	𑂠𑂹𑂗	𑂠𑂹𑂘	𑂠𑂹𑂙	𑂠𑂹𑂛	𑂠𑂹𑂝	𑂠𑂹𑂞	𑂠𑂹𑂟	𑂠𑂹𑂠	𑂠𑂹𑂡	𑂠𑂹𑂢	𑂠𑂹𑂣	𑂠𑂹𑂤	𑂠𑂹𑂥	𑂠𑂹𑂦	𑂠𑂹𑂧	𑂠𑂹𑂨	𑂠𑂹𑂩	𑂠𑂹𑂪	𑂠𑂹𑂫	𑂠𑂹𑂬	𑂠𑂹𑂭	𑂠𑂹𑂮	𑂠𑂹𑂯	𑂠𑂹𑂚	𑂠𑂹𑂜
𑂡	𑂡𑂹𑂍	𑂡𑂹𑂎	𑂡𑂹𑂏	𑂡𑂹𑂐	𑂡𑂹𑂑	𑂡𑂹𑂒	𑂡𑂹𑂓	𑂡𑂹𑂔	𑂡𑂹𑂕	𑂡𑂹𑂖	𑂡𑂹𑂗	𑂡𑂹𑂘	𑂡𑂹𑂙	𑂡𑂹𑂛	𑂡𑂹𑂝	𑂡𑂹𑂞	𑂡𑂹𑂟	𑂡𑂹𑂠	𑂡𑂹𑂡	𑂡𑂹𑂢	𑂡𑂹𑂣	𑂡𑂹𑂤	𑂡𑂹𑂥	𑂡𑂹𑂦	𑂡𑂹𑂧	𑂡𑂹𑂨	𑂡𑂹𑂩	𑂡𑂹𑂪	𑂡𑂹𑂫	𑂡𑂹𑂬	𑂡𑂹𑂭	𑂡𑂹𑂮	𑂡𑂹𑂯	𑂡𑂹𑂚	𑂡𑂹𑂜
𑂢	𑂢𑂹𑂍	𑂢𑂹𑂎	𑂢𑂹𑂏	𑂢𑂹𑂐	𑂢𑂹𑂑	𑂢𑂹𑂒	𑂢𑂹𑂓	𑂢𑂹𑂔	𑂢𑂹𑂕	𑂢𑂹𑂖	𑂢𑂹𑂗	𑂢𑂹𑂘	𑂢𑂹𑂙	𑂢𑂹𑂛	𑂢𑂹𑂝	𑂢𑂹𑂞	𑂢𑂹𑂟	𑂢𑂹𑂠	𑂢𑂹𑂡	𑂢𑂹𑂢	𑂢𑂹𑂣	𑂢𑂹𑂤	𑂢𑂹𑂥	𑂢𑂹𑂦	𑂢𑂹𑂦	𑂢𑂹𑂨	𑂢𑂹𑂩	𑂢𑂹𑂪	𑂢𑂹𑂫	𑂢𑂹𑂬	𑂢𑂹𑂭	𑂢𑂹𑂮	𑂢𑂹𑂯	𑂢𑂹𑂚	𑂢𑂹𑂜
𑂣	𑂣𑂹𑂍	𑂣𑂹𑂎	𑂣𑂹𑂏	𑂣𑂹𑂐	𑂣𑂹𑂑	𑂣𑂹𑂒	𑂣𑂹𑂓	𑂣𑂹𑂔	𑂣𑂹𑂕	𑂣𑂹𑂖	𑂣𑂹𑂗	𑂣𑂹𑂘	𑂣𑂹𑂙	𑂣𑂹𑂛	𑂣𑂹𑂝	𑂣𑂹𑂞	𑂣𑂹𑂟	𑂣𑂹𑂠	𑂣𑂹𑂡	𑂣𑂹𑂢	𑂣𑂹𑂣	𑂣𑂹𑂤	𑂣𑂹𑂥	𑂣𑂹𑂦	𑂣𑂹𑂧	𑂣𑂹𑂨	𑂣𑂹𑂩	𑂣𑂹𑂪	𑂣𑂹𑂫	𑂣𑂹𑂬	𑂣𑂹𑂭	𑂣𑂹𑂮	𑂣𑂹𑂯	𑂣𑂹𑂚	𑂣𑂹𑂜
𑂤	𑂤𑂹𑂍	𑂤𑂹𑂎	𑂤𑂹𑂏	𑂤𑂹𑂐	𑂤𑂹𑂑	𑂤𑂹𑂒	𑂤𑂹𑂓	𑂤𑂹𑂔	𑂤𑂹𑂕	𑂤𑂹𑂖	𑂤𑂹𑂗	𑂤𑂹𑂘	𑂤𑂹𑂙	𑂤𑂹𑂛	𑂤𑂹𑂝	𑂤𑂹𑂞	𑂤𑂹𑂟	𑂤𑂹𑂠	𑂤𑂹𑂡	𑂤𑂹𑂢	𑂤𑂹𑂣	𑂤𑂹𑂤	𑂤𑂹𑂥	𑂤𑂹𑂦	𑂤𑂹𑂧	𑂤𑂹𑂨	𑂤𑂹𑂩	𑂤𑂹𑂪	𑂤𑂹𑂫	𑂤𑂹𑂬	𑂤𑂹𑂭	𑂤𑂹𑂮	𑂤𑂹𑂯	𑂤𑂹𑂚	𑂤𑂹𑂜
𑂥	𑂥𑂹𑂍	𑂥𑂹𑂎	𑂥𑂹𑂏	𑂥𑂹𑂐	𑂥𑂹𑂑	𑂥𑂹𑂒	𑂥𑂹𑂓	𑂥𑂹𑂔	𑂥𑂹𑂕	𑂥𑂹𑂖	𑂥𑂹𑂗	𑂥𑂹𑂘	𑂥𑂹𑂙	𑂥𑂹𑂛	𑂥𑂹𑂝	𑂥𑂹𑂞	𑂥𑂹𑂟	𑂥𑂹𑂠	𑂥𑂹𑂡	𑂥𑂹𑂢	𑂥𑂹𑂣	𑂥𑂹𑂤	𑂥𑂹𑂥	𑂥𑂹𑂦	𑂥𑂹𑂧	𑂥𑂹𑂨	𑂥𑂹𑂩	𑂥𑂹𑂪	𑂥𑂹𑂫	𑂥𑂹𑂬	𑂥𑂹𑂭	𑂥𑂹𑂮	𑂥𑂹𑂯	𑂥𑂹𑂚	𑂥𑂹𑂜
𑂦	𑂦𑂹𑂍	𑂦𑂹𑂎	𑂦𑂹𑂏	𑂦𑂹𑂐	𑂦𑂹𑂑	𑂦𑂹𑂒	𑂦𑂹𑂓	𑂦𑂹𑂔	𑂦𑂹𑂕	𑂦𑂹𑂖	𑂦𑂹𑂗	𑂦𑂹𑂘	𑂦𑂹𑂙	𑂦𑂹𑂛	𑂦𑂹𑂝	𑂦𑂹𑂞	𑂦𑂹𑂟	𑂦𑂹𑂠	𑂦𑂹𑂡	𑂦𑂹𑂢	𑂦𑂹𑂣	𑂦𑂹𑂤	𑂦𑂹𑂥	𑂦𑂹𑂦	𑂦𑂹𑂧	𑂦𑂹𑂨	𑂦𑂹𑂩	𑂦𑂹𑂪	𑂦𑂹𑂫	𑂦𑂹𑂬	𑂦𑂹𑂭	𑂦𑂹𑂮	𑂦𑂹𑂯	𑂦𑂹𑂚	𑂦𑂹𑂜
𑂧	𑂧𑂹𑂍	𑂧𑂹𑂎	𑂧𑂹𑂏	𑂧𑂹𑂐	𑂧𑂹𑂑	𑂧𑂹𑂒	𑂧𑂹𑂓	𑂧𑂹𑂔	𑂧𑂹𑂕	𑂧𑂹𑂖	𑂧𑂹𑂗	𑂧𑂹𑂘	𑂧𑂹𑂙	𑂧𑂹𑂛	𑂧𑂹𑂝	𑂧𑂹𑂞	𑂧𑂹𑂟	𑂧𑂹𑂠	𑂧𑂹𑂡	𑂧𑂹𑂢	𑂧𑂹𑂣	𑂧𑂹𑂤	𑂧𑂹𑂥	𑂧𑂹𑂦	𑂧𑂹𑂧	𑂧𑂹𑂨	𑂧𑂹𑂩	𑂧𑂹𑂪	𑂧𑂹𑂫	𑂧𑂹𑂬	𑂧𑂹𑂭	𑂧𑂹𑂮	𑂧𑂹𑂯	𑂧𑂹𑂚	𑂧𑂹𑂜
𑂨	𑂨𑂹𑂍	𑂨𑂹𑂎	𑂨𑂹𑂏	𑂨𑂹𑂐	𑂨𑂹𑂑	𑂨𑂹𑂒	𑂨𑂹𑂓	𑂨𑂹𑂔	𑂨𑂹𑂕	𑂨𑂹𑂖	𑂨𑂹𑂗	𑂨𑂹𑂘	𑂨𑂹𑂙	𑂨𑂹𑂛	𑂨𑂹𑂝	𑂨𑂹𑂞	𑂨𑂹𑂟	𑂨𑂹𑂠	𑂨𑂹𑂡	𑂨𑂹𑂢	𑂨𑂹𑂣	𑂨𑂹𑂤	𑂨𑂹𑂥	𑂨𑂹𑂦	𑂨𑂹𑂧	𑂨𑂹𑂨	𑂨𑂹𑂩	𑂨𑂹𑂪	𑂨𑂹𑂫	𑂨𑂹𑂬	𑂨𑂹𑂭	𑂨𑂹𑂮	𑂨𑂹𑂯	𑂨𑂹𑂚	𑂨𑂹𑂜
𑂩 (Note: This letter acts as repha (𑂩𑂵𑂤) diacritic when it is first in a conjunct.)	𑂩𑂹𑂍	𑂩𑂹𑂎	𑂩𑂹𑂏	𑂩𑂹𑂐	𑂩𑂹𑂑	𑂩𑂹𑂒	𑂩𑂹𑂓	𑂩𑂹𑂔	𑂩𑂹𑂕	𑂩𑂹𑂖	𑂩𑂹𑂗	𑂩𑂹𑂘	𑂩𑂹𑂙	𑂩𑂹𑂛	𑂩𑂹𑂝	𑂩𑂹𑂞	𑂩𑂹𑂟	𑂩𑂹𑂠	𑂩𑂹𑂡	𑂩𑂹𑂢	𑂩𑂹𑂣	𑂩𑂹𑂤	𑂩𑂹𑂥	𑂩𑂹𑂦	𑂩𑂹𑂧	𑂩𑂹𑂨	𑂩𑂹𑂩	𑂩𑂹𑂪	𑂩𑂹𑂫	𑂩𑂹𑂬	𑂩𑂹𑂭	𑂩𑂹𑂮	𑂩𑂹𑂯	𑂩𑂹𑂚	𑂩𑂹𑂜
𑂪 (Note: This letter lacks ligated forms in Unicode, but has half-stacked ligated forms in Grierson's Plate III.)	𑂪𑂹𑂍	𑂪𑂹𑂎	𑂪𑂹𑂏	𑂪𑂹𑂐	𑂪𑂹𑂑	𑂪𑂹𑂒	𑂪𑂹𑂓	𑂪𑂹𑂔	𑂪𑂹𑂕	𑂪𑂹𑂖	𑂪𑂹𑂗	𑂪𑂹𑂘	𑂪𑂹𑂙	𑂪𑂹𑂛	𑂪𑂹𑂝	𑂪𑂹𑂞	𑂪𑂹𑂟	𑂪𑂹𑂠	𑂪𑂹𑂡	𑂪𑂹𑂢	𑂪𑂹𑂣	𑂪𑂹𑂤	𑂪𑂹𑂥	𑂪𑂹𑂦	𑂪𑂹𑂧	𑂪𑂹𑂨	𑂪𑂹𑂩	𑂪𑂹𑂪	𑂪𑂹𑂫	𑂪𑂹𑂬	𑂪𑂹𑂭	𑂪𑂹𑂮	𑂪𑂹𑂯	𑂪𑂹𑂚	𑂪𑂹𑂜
𑂫	𑂫𑂹𑂍	𑂫𑂹𑂎	𑂫𑂹𑂏	𑂫𑂹𑂐	𑂫𑂹𑂑	𑂫𑂹𑂒	𑂫𑂹𑂓	𑂫𑂹𑂔	𑂫𑂹𑂕	𑂫𑂹𑂖	𑂫𑂹𑂗	𑂫𑂹𑂘	𑂫𑂹𑂙	𑂫𑂹𑂛	𑂫𑂹𑂝	𑂫𑂹𑂞	𑂫𑂹𑂟	𑂫𑂹𑂠	𑂫𑂹𑂡	𑂫𑂹𑂢	𑂫𑂹𑂣	𑂫𑂹𑂤	𑂫𑂹𑂥	𑂫𑂹𑂦	𑂫𑂹𑂧	𑂫𑂹𑂨	𑂫𑂹𑂩	𑂫𑂹𑂪	𑂫𑂹𑂫	𑂫𑂹𑂬	𑂫𑂹𑂭	𑂫𑂹𑂮	𑂫𑂹𑂯	𑂫𑂹𑂚	𑂫𑂹𑂜
𑂬	𑂬𑂹𑂍	𑂬𑂹𑂎	𑂬𑂹𑂏	𑂬𑂹𑂐	𑂬𑂹𑂑	𑂬𑂹𑂒	𑂬𑂹𑂓	𑂬𑂹𑂔	𑂬𑂹𑂕	𑂬𑂹𑂖	𑂬𑂹𑂗	𑂬𑂹𑂘	𑂬𑂹𑂙	𑂬𑂹𑂛	𑂬𑂹𑂝	𑂬𑂹𑂞	𑂬𑂹𑂟	𑂬𑂹𑂠	𑂬𑂹𑂡	𑂬𑂹𑂢	𑂬𑂹𑂣	𑂬𑂹𑂤	𑂬𑂹𑂥	𑂬𑂹𑂦	𑂬𑂹𑂧	𑂬𑂹𑂨	𑂬𑂹𑂩	𑂬𑂹𑂪	𑂬𑂹𑂫	𑂬𑂹𑂬	𑂬𑂹𑂭	𑂬𑂹𑂮	𑂬𑂹𑂯	𑂬𑂹𑂚	𑂬𑂹𑂜
𑂭	𑂭𑂹𑂍	𑂭𑂹𑂎	𑂭𑂹𑂏	𑂭𑂹𑂐	𑂭𑂹𑂑	𑂭𑂹𑂒	𑂭𑂹𑂓	𑂭𑂹𑂔	𑂭𑂹𑂕	𑂭𑂹𑂖	𑂭𑂹𑂗	𑂭𑂹𑂘	𑂭𑂹𑂙	𑂭𑂹𑂛	𑂭𑂹𑂝	𑂭𑂹𑂞	𑂭𑂹𑂟	𑂭𑂹𑂠	𑂭𑂹𑂡	𑂭𑂹𑂢	𑂭𑂹𑂣	𑂭𑂹𑂤	𑂭𑂹𑂥	𑂭𑂹𑂦	𑂭𑂹𑂧	𑂭𑂹𑂨	𑂭𑂹𑂩	𑂭𑂹𑂪	𑂭𑂹𑂫	𑂭𑂹𑂬	𑂭𑂹𑂭	𑂭𑂹𑂮	𑂭𑂹𑂯	𑂭𑂹𑂚	𑂭𑂹𑂜
𑂮	𑂮𑂹𑂍	𑂮𑂹𑂎	𑂮𑂹𑂏	𑂮𑂹𑂐	𑂮𑂹𑂑	𑂮𑂹𑂒	𑂮𑂹𑂓	𑂮𑂹𑂔	𑂮𑂹𑂕	𑂮𑂹𑂖	𑂮𑂹𑂗	𑂮𑂹𑂘	𑂮𑂹𑂙	𑂮𑂹𑂛	𑂮𑂹𑂝	𑂮𑂹𑂞	𑂮𑂹𑂟	𑂮𑂹𑂠	𑂮𑂹𑂡	𑂮𑂹𑂢	𑂮𑂹𑂣	𑂮𑂹𑂤	𑂮𑂹𑂥	𑂮𑂹𑂦	𑂮𑂹𑂧	𑂮𑂹𑂨	𑂮𑂹𑂩	𑂮𑂹𑂪	𑂮𑂹𑂫	𑂮𑂹𑂬	𑂮𑂹𑂭	𑂮𑂹𑂮	𑂮𑂹𑂯	𑂮𑂹𑂚	𑂮𑂹𑂜
𑂯	𑂯𑂹𑂍	𑂯𑂹𑂎	𑂯𑂹𑂏	𑂯𑂹𑂐	𑂯𑂹𑂑	𑂯𑂹𑂒	𑂯𑂹𑂓	𑂯𑂹𑂔	𑂯𑂹𑂕	𑂯𑂹𑂖	𑂯𑂹𑂗	𑂯𑂹𑂘	𑂯𑂹𑂙	𑂯𑂹𑂛	𑂯𑂹𑂝	𑂯𑂹𑂞	𑂯𑂹𑂟	𑂯𑂹𑂠	𑂯𑂹𑂡	𑂯𑂹𑂢	𑂯𑂹𑂣	𑂯𑂹𑂤	𑂯𑂹𑂥	𑂯𑂹𑂦	𑂯𑂹𑂧	𑂯𑂹𑂨	𑂯𑂹𑂩	𑂯𑂹𑂪	𑂯𑂹𑂫	𑂯𑂹𑂬	𑂯𑂹𑂭	𑂯𑂹𑂮	𑂯𑂹𑂯	𑂯𑂹𑂚	𑂯𑂹𑂜
𑂚	𑂚𑂹𑂍	𑂚𑂹𑂎	𑂚𑂹𑂏	𑂚𑂹𑂐	𑂚𑂹𑂑	𑂚𑂹𑂒	𑂚𑂹𑂓	𑂚𑂹𑂔	𑂚𑂹𑂕	𑂚𑂹𑂖	𑂚𑂹𑂗	𑂚𑂹𑂘	𑂚𑂹𑂙	𑂚𑂹𑂛	𑂚𑂹𑂝	𑂚𑂹𑂞	𑂚𑂹𑂟	𑂚𑂹𑂠	𑂚𑂹𑂡	𑂚𑂹𑂢	𑂚𑂹𑂣	𑂚𑂹𑂤	𑂚𑂹𑂥	𑂚𑂹𑂦	𑂚𑂹𑂧	𑂚𑂹𑂨	𑂚𑂹𑂩	𑂚𑂹𑂪	𑂚𑂹𑂫	𑂚𑂹𑂬	𑂚𑂹𑂭	𑂚𑂹𑂮	𑂚𑂹𑂯	𑂚𑂹𑂚	𑂚𑂹𑂜
𑂜	𑂜𑂹𑂍	𑂜𑂹𑂎	𑂜𑂹𑂏	𑂜𑂹𑂐	𑂜𑂹𑂑	𑂜𑂹𑂒	𑂜𑂹𑂓	𑂜𑂹𑂔	𑂜𑂹𑂕	𑂜𑂹𑂖	𑂜𑂹𑂗	𑂜𑂹𑂘	𑂜𑂹𑂙	𑂜𑂹𑂛	𑂜𑂹𑂝	𑂜𑂹𑂞	𑂜𑂹𑂟	𑂜𑂹𑂠	𑂜𑂹𑂡	𑂜𑂹𑂢	𑂜𑂹𑂣	𑂜𑂹𑂤	𑂜𑂹𑂥	𑂜𑂹𑂦	𑂜𑂹𑂧	𑂜𑂹𑂨	𑂜𑂹𑂩	𑂜𑂹𑂪	𑂜𑂹𑂫	𑂜𑂹𑂬	𑂜𑂹𑂭	𑂜𑂹𑂮	𑂜𑂹𑂯	𑂜𑂹𑂚	𑂜𑂹𑂜
𑂫𑂹𑂨𑂝𑂹𑂔𑂢	𑂍	𑂎	𑂏	𑂐	𑂑	𑂒	𑂓	𑂔	𑂕	𑂖	𑂗	𑂘	𑂙	𑂛	𑂝	𑂞	𑂟	𑂠	𑂡	𑂢	𑂣	𑂤	𑂥	𑂦	𑂧	𑂨	𑂩 (Note: This letter acts as rakar (𑂩𑂍𑂰𑂩) diacritic when it is second in a conjunct.)	𑂪	𑂫	𑂬	𑂭	𑂮	𑂯	𑂚	𑂜

== Vowel diacritics ==
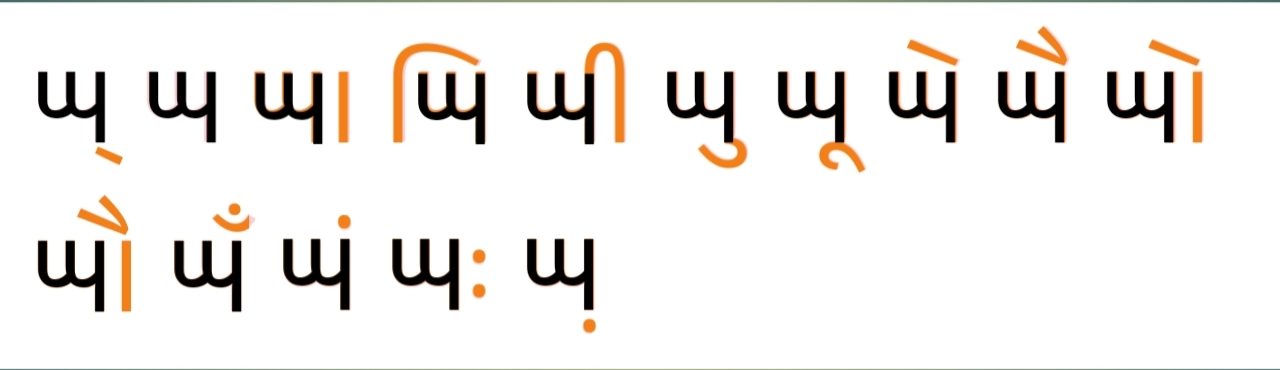
Kaithi diacritics with kha (𑂎)

The following table shows the list of vowel diacritics on consonants.

्	𑂃	𑂄	𑂅	𑂆	𑂇	𑂈	𑂉	𑂊	𑂋	𑂌	𑂃𑂁	𑂃𑂂
𑂍𑂹	𑂍	𑂍𑂰	𑂍𑂱	𑂍𑂲	𑂍𑂳	𑂍𑂴	𑂍𑂵	𑂍𑂶	𑂍𑂷	𑂍𑂸	𑂍𑂁	𑂍𑂂
𑂎𑂹	𑂎	𑂎𑂰	𑂎𑂱	𑂎𑂲	𑂎𑂳	𑂎𑂴	𑂎𑂵	𑂎𑂶	𑂎𑂷	𑂎𑂸	𑂎𑂁	𑂎𑂂
𑂏𑂹	𑂏	𑂏𑂰	𑂏𑂱	𑂏𑂲	𑂏𑂳	𑂏𑂴	𑂏𑂵	𑂏𑂶	𑂏𑂷	𑂏𑂸	𑂏𑂁	𑂏𑂂
𑂐𑂹	𑂐	𑂐𑂰	𑂐𑂱	𑂐𑂲	𑂐𑂳	𑂐𑂴	𑂐𑂵	𑂐𑂶	𑂐𑂷	𑂐𑂸	𑂐𑂁	𑂐𑂂
𑂑 𑂹	𑂑	𑂑𑂰	𑂑𑂱	𑂑𑂲	𑂑𑂳	𑂑𑂴	𑂑𑂵	𑂑𑂶	𑂑𑂷	𑂑𑂸	𑂑𑂁	𑂑𑂂
𑂒𑂹	𑂒	𑂒𑂰	𑂒𑂱	𑂒𑂲	𑂒𑂳	𑂒𑂴	𑂒𑂵	𑂒𑂶	𑂒𑂷	𑂒𑂸	𑂒𑂁	𑂒𑂂
𑂓𑂹	𑂓	𑂓𑂰	𑂓𑂱	𑂓𑂲	𑂓𑂳	𑂓𑂴	𑂓𑂵	𑂓𑂶	𑂓𑂷	𑂓𑂸	𑂓𑂁	𑂓𑂂
𑂔𑂹	𑂔	𑂔𑂰	𑂔𑂱	𑂔𑂲	𑂔𑂳	𑂔𑂴	𑂔𑂵	𑂔𑂶	𑂔𑂷	𑂔𑂸	𑂔𑂁	𑂔𑂂
𑂕𑂹	𑂕	𑂕𑂰	𑂕𑂱	𑂕𑂲	𑂕𑂳	𑂕𑂴	𑂕𑂵	𑂕𑂶	𑂕𑂷	𑂕𑂸	𑂕𑂁	𑂕𑂂
𑂖𑂹	𑂖	𑂖𑂰	𑂖𑂱	𑂖𑂲	𑂖𑂳	𑂖𑂴	𑂖𑂵	𑂖𑂶	𑂖𑂷	𑂖𑂸	𑂖𑂁	𑂖𑂂
𑂗 𑂹	𑂗	𑂗𑂰	𑂗𑂱	𑂗𑂲	𑂗𑂳	𑂗𑂴	𑂗𑂵	𑂗𑂶	𑂗𑂷	𑂗𑂸	𑂗𑂁	𑂗𑂂
𑂘𑂹	𑂘	𑂘𑂰	𑂘𑂱	𑂘𑂲	𑂘𑂳	𑂘𑂴	𑂘𑂵	𑂘𑂶	𑂘𑂷	𑂘𑂸	𑂘𑂁	𑂘𑂂
𑂙𑂹	𑂙	𑂙𑂰	𑂙𑂱	𑂙𑂲	𑂙𑂳	𑂙𑂴	𑂙𑂵	𑂙𑂶	𑂙𑂷	𑂙𑂸	𑂙𑂁	𑂙𑂂
𑂛𑂹	𑂛	𑂛𑂰	𑂛𑂱	𑂛𑂲	𑂛𑂳	𑂛𑂴	𑂛𑂵	𑂛𑂶	𑂛𑂷	𑂛𑂸	𑂛𑂁	𑂛𑂂
𑂝𑂹	𑂝	𑂝𑂰	𑂝𑂱	𑂝𑂲	𑂝𑂳	𑂝𑂴	𑂝𑂵	𑂝𑂶	𑂝𑂷	𑂝𑂸	𑂝𑂁	𑂝𑂂
𑂞𑂹	𑂞	𑂞𑂰	𑂞𑂱	𑂞𑂲	𑂞𑂳	𑂞𑂴	𑂞𑂵	𑂞𑂶	𑂞𑂷	𑂞𑂸	𑂞𑂁	𑂞𑂂
𑂟𑂹	𑂟	𑂟𑂰	𑂟𑂱	𑂟𑂲	𑂟𑂳	𑂟𑂴	𑂟𑂵	𑂟𑂶	𑂟𑂷	𑂟𑂸	𑂟𑂁	𑂟𑂂
𑂠𑂹	𑂠	𑂠𑂰	𑂠𑂱	𑂠𑂲	𑂠𑂳	𑂠𑂴	𑂠𑂵	𑂠𑂶	𑂠𑂷	𑂠𑂸	𑂠𑂁	𑂠𑂂
𑂡𑂹	𑂡	𑂡𑂰	𑂡𑂱	𑂡𑂲	𑂡𑂳	𑂡𑂴	𑂡𑂵	𑂡𑂶	𑂡𑂷	𑂡𑂸	𑂡𑂁	𑂡𑂂
𑂢𑂹	𑂢	𑂢𑂰	𑂢𑂱	𑂢𑂲	𑂢𑂳	𑂢𑂴	𑂢𑂵	𑂢𑂶	𑂢𑂷	𑂢𑂸	𑂢𑂁	𑂢𑂂
𑂣𑂹	𑂣	𑂣𑂰	𑂣𑂱	𑂣𑂲	𑂣𑂳	𑂣𑂴	𑂣𑂵	𑂣𑂶	𑂣𑂷	𑂣𑂸	𑂣𑂁	𑂣𑂂
𑂤𑂹	𑂤	𑂤𑂰	𑂤𑂱	𑂤𑂲	𑂤𑂳	𑂤𑂴	𑂤𑂵	𑂤𑂶	𑂤𑂷	𑂤𑂸	𑂤𑂁	𑂤𑂂
𑂥𑂹	𑂥	𑂥𑂰	𑂥𑂱	𑂥𑂲	𑂥𑂳	𑂥𑂴	𑂥𑂵	𑂥𑂶	𑂥𑂷	𑂥𑂸	𑂥𑂁	𑂥𑂂
𑂦𑂹	𑂦	𑂦𑂰	𑂦𑂱	𑂦𑂲	𑂦𑂳	𑂦𑂴	𑂦𑂵	𑂦𑂶	𑂦𑂷	𑂦𑂸	𑂦𑂁	𑂦𑂂
𑂧𑂹	𑂧	𑂧𑂰	𑂧𑂱	𑂧𑂲	𑂧𑂳	𑂧𑂴	𑂧𑂵	𑂧𑂶	𑂧𑂷	𑂧𑂸	𑂧𑂁	𑂧𑂂
𑂨𑂹	𑂨	𑂨𑂰	𑂨𑂱	𑂨𑂲	𑂨𑂳	𑂨𑂴	𑂨𑂵	𑂨𑂶	𑂨𑂷	𑂨𑂸	𑂨𑂁	𑂨𑂂
𑂩𑂹	𑂩	𑂩𑂰	𑂩𑂱	𑂩𑂲	𑂩𑂳	𑂩𑂴	𑂩𑂵	𑂩𑂶	𑂩𑂷	𑂩𑂸	𑂩𑂁	𑂩𑂂
𑂪𑂹	𑂪	𑂪𑂰	𑂪𑂱	𑂪𑂲	𑂪𑂳	𑂪𑂴	𑂪𑂵	𑂪𑂶	𑂪𑂷	𑂪𑂸	𑂪𑂁	𑂪𑂂
𑂫𑂹	𑂫	𑂫𑂰	𑂫𑂱	𑂫𑂲	𑂫𑂳	𑂫𑂴	𑂫𑂵	𑂫𑂶	𑂫𑂷	𑂫𑂸	𑂫𑂁	𑂫𑂂
𑂬𑂹	𑂬	𑂬𑂰	𑂬𑂱	𑂬𑂲	𑂬𑂳	𑂬𑂴	𑂬𑂵	𑂬𑂶	𑂬𑂷	𑂬𑂸	𑂬𑂁	𑂬𑂂
𑂭𑂹	𑂭	𑂭𑂰	𑂭𑂱	𑂭𑂲	𑂭𑂳	𑂭𑂴	𑂭𑂵	𑂭𑂶	𑂭𑂷	𑂭𑂸	𑂭𑂁	𑂭𑂂
𑂮𑂹	𑂮	𑂮𑂰	𑂮𑂱	𑂮𑂲	𑂮𑂳	𑂮𑂴	𑂮𑂵	𑂮𑂶	𑂮𑂷	𑂮𑂸	𑂮𑂁	𑂮𑂂
𑂯𑂹	𑂯	𑂯𑂰	𑂯𑂱	𑂯𑂲	𑂯𑂳	𑂯𑂴	𑂯𑂵	𑂯𑂶	𑂯𑂷	𑂯𑂸	𑂯𑂁	𑂯𑂂

== Signs and punctuation ==
Kaithi has several script-specific punctuation marks:

Sign	Description
𑂻	The abbreviation sign is one method of representing abbreviations in Kaithi. For example, 𑂪𑂱𑂎𑂱𑂞𑂧 can be abbreviated as 𑂪𑂲𑂻.
𑂽	The number sign is used with digits for enumerated lists and numerical sequences. It can appear above, below, or before a digit or sequence of digits. For example, 𑂽१२३.
𑂼	The enumeration sign is a spacing version of the number sign. It always appears before a digit or sequence of digits (never above or below).
𑂾	The section sign indicates the end of a sentence.
𑂿	The double section sign indicates the end of a larger section of text, such as a paragraph.
𑃀	Danda is a Kaithi-specific danda, which can mark the end of a sentence or line.
𑃁	Double danda is a Kaithi-specific double danda.

General punctuation is also used with Kaithi:

- + plus sign can be used to mark phrase boundaries
- ‐ hyphen and - hyphen-minus can be used for hyphenation
- ⸱ word separator middle dot can be used as a word boundary (as can a hyphen)

== Numerals ==
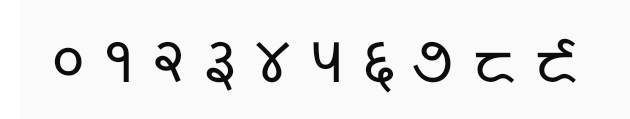
Kaithi Numbers (0 to 9)

Kaithi uses stylistic variants of Devanagari numeral. It also uses common Indic number signs for fractions and unit marks.

== Sample text ==
The following text is Article 1 of the Universal Declaration of Human Rights, written in various languages using the Kaithi script:

Article 1: All human beings are born free and equal in dignity and rights. They are endowed with reason and conscience and should act towards one another in a spirit of brotherhood.

Bhojpuri:

𑂃𑂢𑂳𑂒𑂹𑂓𑂵𑂠 १: 𑂮𑂥𑂯𑂱 𑂪𑂷𑂍𑂰𑂢𑂱 𑂄𑂔𑂰𑂠𑂵 𑂔𑂢𑂹𑂧𑂵𑂪𑂰 𑂄𑂇𑂩 𑂋𑂎𑂱𑂢𑂱𑂨𑂷 𑂍𑂵 𑂥𑂩𑂰𑂥𑂩 𑂮𑂧𑂹𑂧𑂰𑂢 𑂄𑂋𑂩 𑂃𑂡𑂱𑂍𑂰𑂩 𑂣𑂹𑂩𑂰𑂣𑂹𑂞 𑂯𑂫𑂵 𑃀 𑂋𑂎𑂱𑂢𑂱𑂨𑂷 𑂍𑂵 𑂣𑂰𑂮 𑂮𑂧𑂕-𑂥𑂴𑂕 𑂄𑂇𑂩 𑂃𑂢𑂹𑂞:𑂍𑂩𑂝 𑂍𑂵 𑂄𑂫𑂰𑂔 𑂯𑂷𑂎𑂞𑂰 𑂄𑂋𑂩 𑂯𑂳𑂢𑂍𑂷 𑂍𑂵 𑂠𑂷𑂮𑂩𑂰 𑂍𑂵 𑂮𑂰𑂟 𑂦𑂰𑂆𑂒𑂰𑂩𑂵 𑂍𑂵 𑂥𑂵𑂫𑂯𑂰𑂩 𑂍𑂩𑂵 𑂍𑂵 𑂯𑂷𑂎𑂪𑂰 𑃁

Magadhi:

𑂃𑂢𑂳𑂒𑂹𑂓𑂵𑂠 १. - 𑂮𑂥 𑂪𑂷𑂏 𑂄𑂔𑂰𑂠𑂵 𑂔𑂢𑂹𑂧 𑂪𑂵𑂥 𑂯𑂟𑂹𑂩 𑂞𑂟𑂰 𑂮𑂥 𑂍𑂵 𑂥𑂩𑂰𑂥𑂩𑂵 𑂮𑂧𑂹𑂧𑂰𑂢 𑂄𑂇𑂩 𑂄𑂡𑂹𑂞𑂹𑂩𑂰𑂢 𑂯𑂆 𑃀 𑂯𑂳𑂢𑂹𑂨𑂹𑂫𑂷 𑂍𑂵 𑂐𑂰𑂮 𑂮𑂧𑂕-𑂥𑂴𑂕 𑂄𑂇𑂩 𑂄𑂢𑂹𑂞𑂹𑂩𑂹𑂍𑂩𑂝 𑂍𑂵 𑂄𑂫𑂰𑂔 𑂯𑂷𑂥 𑂯𑂟𑂹𑂩। 𑂄𑂇𑂩 𑂯𑂳𑂢𑂹𑂍𑂰 𑂠𑂷𑂮𑂩𑂷 𑂍𑂵 𑂮𑂰𑂟 𑂦𑂰𑂆𑂔𑂰𑂩𑂰 𑂍𑂵 𑂫𑂹𑂨𑂫𑂯𑂰𑂩 𑂍𑂩𑂵 𑂣𑂛𑂹𑂪 𑂯𑂟𑂹𑂩 𑃁

Maithili:

𑂃𑂢𑂳𑂒𑂹𑂓𑂵𑂠 १: 𑂮𑂦 𑂧𑂰𑂢𑂫 𑂔𑂢𑂹𑂧𑂞𑂂 𑂮𑂹𑂫𑂞𑂢𑂹𑂞𑂹𑂩 𑂃𑂓𑂱' 𑂞𑂟𑂰 𑂏𑂩𑂱𑂧𑂰 𑂄 𑂃𑂡𑂱𑂍𑂰𑂩𑂧𑂵 𑂮𑂧𑂰𑂢 𑂃𑂓𑂱'𑃀 𑂮𑂦𑂍𑂵𑂀 𑂃𑂣𑂢–𑂃𑂣𑂢 𑂥𑂳𑂠𑂹𑂡𑂱 𑂄 𑂫𑂱𑂫𑂵𑂍 𑂓𑂶𑂍 𑂄𑂋𑂩 𑂮𑂦𑂍𑂵𑂀 𑂉𑂍 𑂠𑂷𑂮𑂩𑂰𑂍 𑂣𑂹𑂩𑂞𑂱 𑂮𑂸𑂯𑂰𑂩𑂹𑂠𑂣𑂴𑂩𑂹𑂝 𑂫𑂹𑂨𑂫𑂯𑂰𑂩 𑂍𑂩𑂥𑂰𑂍 𑂒𑂰𑂯𑂲 𑃁

Angika:

𑂃𑂢𑂳𑂒𑂹𑂓𑂵𑂠 १: 𑂮𑂥𑂹𑂦𑂵 𑂧𑂢𑂳𑂭𑂹𑂣 𑂍𑂵 𑂏𑂸𑂩𑂫 𑂄𑂩𑂴 𑂄𑂡𑂱𑂍𑂰𑂩 𑂩𑂰 𑂮𑂁𑂠𑂩𑂹𑂦 𑂧𑂁 𑂔𑂢𑂹𑂧𑂔𑂰𑂞 𑂮𑂹𑂫𑂞𑂁𑂞𑂹𑂩𑂞𑂰 𑂫 𑂮𑂧𑂰𑂢𑂞𑂰 𑂣𑂹𑂩𑂰𑂣𑂹𑂞 𑂓𑂶 𑃀 𑂯𑂳𑂢𑂍𑂰 𑂮𑂥 𑂍𑂵 𑂃𑂁𑂞𑂩𑂰𑂞𑂹𑂧𑂰 𑂩𑂰 𑂠𑂵𑂢 𑂣𑂹𑂩𑂰𑂣𑂹𑂞 𑂓𑂶 𑂄𑂩𑂴 𑂯𑂳𑂢𑂍𑂰 𑂣𑂩𑂮𑂹𑂣𑂩 𑂥𑂁𑂡𑂳𑂞𑂰 𑂩𑂰 𑂦𑂰𑂫 𑂮𑂁 𑂮𑂹𑂫𑂰𑂦𑂰𑂫 𑂍𑂩𑂢𑂰 𑂒𑂰𑂯𑂱𑂨𑂰 𑃁

Hindi:

𑂃𑂢𑂳𑂒𑂹𑂓𑂵𑂠 १. 𑂮𑂦𑂲 𑂧𑂢𑂳𑂭𑂹𑂨 𑂔𑂢𑂹𑂧 𑂮𑂵 𑂮𑂹𑂫𑂞𑂢𑂹𑂞𑂹𑂩 𑂞𑂟𑂰 𑂧𑂩𑂹𑂨𑂰𑂠𑂰 𑂌𑂩 𑂃𑂡𑂱𑂍𑂰𑂩𑂷𑂁 𑂧𑂵𑂁 𑂮𑂧𑂰𑂢 𑂯𑂷𑂞𑂵 𑂯𑂶𑂁𑃀 𑂫𑂵 𑂞𑂩𑂹𑂍 𑂌𑂩 𑂫𑂱𑂫𑂵𑂍 𑂮𑂵 𑂮𑂧𑂹𑂣𑂢𑂹𑂢 𑂯𑂶𑂁 𑂞𑂟𑂰 𑂇𑂢𑂹𑂯𑂵𑂁 𑂦𑂹𑂩𑂰𑂞𑃂𑂞𑂹𑂫 𑂍𑂲 𑂦𑂰𑂫𑂢𑂰 𑂮𑂵 𑂣𑂩𑂮𑂹𑂣𑂩 𑂍𑂵 𑂣𑂹𑂩𑂞𑂱 𑂍𑂰𑂩𑂹𑂨 𑂍𑂩𑂢𑂰 𑂒𑂰𑂯𑂱𑂉 𑃁

== Unicode ==
Kaithi script was added to the Unicode Standard in October 2009 with the release of version 5.2.

The Unicode block for Kaithi is U+11080–U+110CF:

Kaithi^{[1]}^{[2]} Official Unicode Consortium code chart (PDF)
	0	1	2	3	4	5	6	7	8	9	A	B	C	D	E	F
U+1108x	𑂀	𑂁	𑂂	𑂃	𑂄	𑂅	𑂆	𑂇	𑂈	𑂉	𑂊	𑂋	𑂌	𑂍	𑂎	𑂏
U+1109x	𑂐	𑂑	𑂒	𑂓	𑂔	𑂕	𑂖	𑂗	𑂘	𑂙	𑂚	𑂛	𑂜	𑂝	𑂞	𑂟
U+110Ax	𑂠	𑂡	𑂢	𑂣	𑂤	𑂥	𑂦	𑂧	𑂨	𑂩	𑂪	𑂫	𑂬	𑂭	𑂮	𑂯
U+110Bx	𑂰	𑂱	𑂲	𑂳	𑂴	𑂵	𑂶	𑂷	𑂸	𑂹	𑂺	𑂻	𑂼	𑂽	𑂾	𑂿
U+110Cx	𑃀	𑃁	𑃂											𑃍		
Notes 1.As of Unicode version 18.0 2.Grey areas indicate non-assigned code points

== Publications ==
The first Bhojpuri quarterly Bagsar Samāchar was published in this script in 1915.

== Sources ==
- Grierson, George Abraham (1881). A Handbook to the Kayathi Character. Calcutta: Thacker, Spink and Co – via HathiTrust.
