= List of districts of Jharkhand =

Districts of Jharkhand
- Districts of Jharkhand
- Category: Districts
- Location: Jharkhand
- Number: 24 districts
- Populations: Lohardaga – 461,790 (lowest); Ranchi – 2,914,253 (highest)
- Areas: Ramgarh – 1,341 km^{2} (518 sq mi) (smallest); West Singhbhum – 7,224 km^{2} (2,789 sq mi) (largest)
- Government: Government of Jharkhand
- Subdivisions: Subdivisions of Jharkhand

The Indian state of Jharkhand is divided into 24 districts. Districts are the major administrative units of a state which are further subdivided into sub-divisions and blocks.

== Administration ==
A district in an Indian state is an administrative and geographical unit, headed by a Deputy Commissioner (DC), an officer belonging to the Indian Administrative Service (IAS), who also functions as the District Magistrate and District Collector.

A Superintendent of Police (SP), an officer belonging to Indian Police Service is entrusted with the responsibility of police administration, maintaining law and order and related issues.

== History ==
At the time of formation, Jharkhand state had 18 districts. Later, six more districts were carved out by reorganizing these districts. The 23rd and 24th districts- Khunti and Ramgarh (carved out of erstwhile Ranchi and Hazaribagh District respectively) were made a district on 12 September 2007.

== Administrative Divisions and District ==
There are 24 districts of Jharkhand, which are grouped in to 5 divisions. These divisions are:

1. Palamu division - 3 Districts: Palamu, Garhwa, Latehar - Headquarters: Medininagar
2. North Chotanagpur division - 7 Districts: Chatra, Hazaribagh, Koderma, Giridih, Ramgarh, Bokaro, Dhanbad - Headquarters: Hazaribagh
3. South Chotanagpur division - 5 Districts: Lohardaga, Gumla, Simdega, Ranchi, Khunti - Headquarters: Ranchi
4. Kolhan division - 3 Districts: West Singhbhum, Saraikela-Kharsawan, East Singhbhum - Headquarters: Chaibasa
5. Santhal Pargana division - 6 Districts: Jamtara, Deoghar, Dumka, Pakur, Godda, Sahebganj - Headquarters: Dumka

Below is the list of districts:

Code	District	Headquarters	Area (km^{2})	Population (2011)	Population Density (/km^{2})	Map
BO	Bokaro	Bokaro Steel City	2,883	2,062,330	715	
CH	Chatra	Chatra	3,718	1,042,886	280	
DE	Deoghar	Deoghar	2,477	1,492,073	602	
DH	Dhanbad	Dhanbad	2,040	2,684,487	1316	
DU	Dumka	Dumka	3,761	1,321,442	351	
ES	East Singhbhum	Jamshedpur	3,562	2,293,919	644	
GA	Garhwa	Garhwa	4,093	1,322,784	323	
GI	Giridih	Giridih	4,854	2,445,474	503	
GO	Godda	Godda	2,266	1,313,551	580	
GU	Gumla	Gumla	5,360	1,025,213	191	
HA	Hazaribagh	Hazaribagh	3,555	1,734,495	488	
JA	Jamtara	Jamtara	1,811	791,042	437	
KH	Khunti	Khunti	2,535	531,885	210	
KO	Koderma	Kodarma	1,655	716,259	282	
LA	Latehar	Latehar	4,291	726,978	169	
LO	Lohardaga	Lohardaga	1,502	461,790	307	
PK	Pakur	Pakur	1,811	900,422	497	
PL	Palamu	Medininagar	4,393	1,939,869	442	
RM	Ramgarh	Ramgarh Cantonment	1,341	949,443	708	
RA	Ranchi	Ranchi	5,097	2,914,253	572	
SA	Sahibganj	Sahibganj	2,063	1,150,567	558	
SK	Saraikela-Kharsawan	Saraikela	2,657	1,065,056	401	
SD	Simdega	Simdega	3,774	599,578	159	
WS	West Singhbhum	Chaibasa	7,224	1,502,338	208	

== See also ==
- Administrative divisions of Jharkhand
- Jharkhand
- Subdivisions of Jharkhand
