= Tarhasi block =

Tarhasi
- Block

- Location in jharkhand, India
- Coordinates: 24.08°N 84.30°E
- Country: India
- State: Jharkhand
- District: Palamu
- Block: Tarhasi

Government
  - MLA: Devendra Singh (Bittu Singh); Indian National Congress

Population (2001)
  - Total: 86,139

Languages
  - Official: Magahi, Hindi
- Time zone: UTC+5:30 (IST)
- PIN: 822118
- Website: palamu.nic.in/Tarhasi.html

Tarhasi Block is one of the administrative blocks of Palamu district, Jharkhand state, India situated in the bank of amanat river.

== Demographics ==
Religion in Tarhasi block (2011)
Religion	Percent
Hinduism	86.36%
Islam	13.25%
Other or not stated	0.39%

At the time of the 2011 census, Tarhasi block had a population of 81,297. Tarhasi block had a sex ratio of 940 females per 1000 males and a literacy rate of 63.56%: 74.47% for males and 51.94% for females. 13,717 (16.87%) were under 7 years of age. The entire population lived in rural areas. Scheduled Castes and Scheduled Tribes were 23,129 (28.45%) and 1,906 (2.34%) of the population, respectively.

Languages of Tarhasi block (2011)
1. Hindi (94.81%)
2. Urdu (5.14%)
3. Others (0.05%)

== Colleges and Schools in Tarhasi ==
- SSMS Degree College Tarhasi
- Govt. Middle School Tarhasi
- IGG High School Tarhasi
- RK+2 High School Tarhasi
- Kashturba Gandhi Vidyalay
- Kanya Prathamik Vidyalay

== Transport ==
- The nearest airport is 173 kilometers away in Ranchi. the nearest railway station is 35 km away in Daltonganj. Tarhasi is well connected with Daltonganj, Ranchi, Delhi, Panki, Lesliganj, Manatu, Sherghati, Gaya and Patan by road. The major transport of Tarhasi is Autorickshaw and Buses

== See also ==
- Palamu Loksabha constituency
- Jharkhand Legislative Assembly
- Jharkhand
- Palamu
