= Pipra (disambiguation) =

Pipra is a genus of bird in the family Pipridae.

Pipra may also refer to:

A place in Maithili where pipar or peepal tree are abundantly found.

== Places ==
=== India ===
Villages in Pashchim Champaran district, Bihar

- Gaunaha taluka
  - Pipra, Gaunaha (census code 216364)
  - Pipra, Gaunaha (census code 216412)
  - Pipra, Gaunaha (census code 216433)
- Narkatiaganj taluka
  - Pipra, Narkatiaganj (census code 216588)
  - Pipra, Narkatiaganj (census code 216695)
  - Pipra, Narkatiaganj (census code 216737)
- Ramnagar taluka
  - Pipra, Ramnagar (census code 216190)
  - Pipra, Ramnagar (census code 216269)
  - Pipra, Ramnagar (census code 216279)
- Sidhaw taluka
  - Pipra, Sidhaw (census code 215992)
  - Pipra, Sidhaw (census code 216009)
  - Pipra, Sidhaw (census code 216093)
  - Pipra, Sidhaw (census code 216155)
- Other talukas
  - Pipra, Bagaha (census code 216878)
  - Pipra, Mainatanr (census code 216513)
- Pipra block, Jharkhand

=== Nepal ===
- Pipra, Mahottari, a village development committee in Mahottari District
- Pipra (Purba), a village in Kanchan Roop Municipality, Saptari District
- Pipra (West), a village in Saptari District

== Electoral constituencies ==
- Pipra, Purvi Champaran (Vidhan Sabha constituency)
- Pipra, Supaul (Vidhan Sabha constituency)
