= Buchi Lami =

- village
- Location in Jharkhand, India Buchi Lami (India)
- Coordinates: 24.19°N 84.12°E
- Country: India
- State: Jharkhand
- District: Palamu
- Block: Padwa Block
- Village: Buchi Lami

Government
  - MLA: Radha Krishna Kishore; Bharatiya Janata Party

Population (2011)
  - Total: 886

Languages
  - Official: Magahi, Hindi
- Time zone: UTC+5:30 (IST)
- PIN: 822123
- Vehicle registration: JH
- Website: palamu.nic.in

Buchi Lami is a small village located in Padwa block of Palamu district, Jharkhand state, India. According to census (2011), The Buchi Lami village has population of 886 of which 443 are males while 443 are females.

Buchi Lami is a part of Chhatarpur (Vidhan Sabha constituency).

== Languages ==
Languages spoken here include Asuri, an Austroasiatic language spoken by approximately 17 000 in India, largely in the southern part of Palamu; and Bhojpuri, a tongue in the Bihari language group with almost 40 000 000 speakers, written in both the Devanagari and Kaithi scripts.

== See also ==
- Chhatarpur Assembly
- Palamu Loksabha constituency
- Jharkhand Legislative Assembly
- Jharkhand
- Palamu
