= Naudiha =

- Location in jharkhand, India Naudiha (India)
- Coordinates: 24.3774°N 84.2985°E
- Country: India
- State: Jharkhand
- District: Palamu
- Block: Naudiha Bazar block

Naudiha is a village in Naudiha Bazar block in Palamu District of Jharkhand, India. It is located 62 km from district headquarters Daltonganj and 201 km from the state capital Ranchi. Naudiha is surrounded by Hariharganj Block towards North, Dumaria Block towards East, Patan Block towards South, Hussainabad Block towards west. Naudiha Population

Hussainabad, Daltonganj, Aurangabad Bihar, Garhwa are the nearby Cities to Naudiha.

This Place is in the border of the Palamu District and Aurangabad Bihar District. Aurangabad Bihar District Kutumba is North towards this place . It is near to the Bihar State Border.

== Demographics of Naudiha ==
Hindi is the Local Language here.

== Politics in Naudiha ==
JD(U), BJP, JMM, RJD, BSP are the major political parties in this area.

== Pincodes near Naudiha ==
822113 ( Chhatarpur ), 822131 ( Hariharganj Palamau), 822123 ( Patan Palamau)

== Culture ==
Major Hindu festivals are celebrated in Naudiha. Hindus celebrate chhath and durga puja.

== Temples ==
Devi Mandap is a temple situated in the center of Naudiha. Many people come here to worship Devi on all day.

== See also ==
- Palamu Loksabha constituency
- Jharkhand Legislative Assembly
- Jharkhand
- Palamu
- Naudiha Bazar
- Naudiha Bazar block
