= Nilamber and Pitamber =

Brothers and freedom fighters from India

Nilamber and Pitamber Bhogta were tribal brothers and freedom fighters from Jharkhand, eastern India, who led a revolt against the East India Company during the Indian Rebellion of 1857. They were born into a family of Bhogta clan of Kharwar tribe in the village Chemo-Senya in Latehar district, a Chotanagpur plateau region of Jharkhand. Their father, Chemu Singh, was Jagirdar. They decided to declare themselves independent of company rule, inspired by the Doronda Revolt in Ranchi led by Thakur Vishwanath Shahdeo and Pandey Ganpat Rai. Chero Jagirdar Devi Baksh Rai joined them.

On 21 October 1857, 500 people, led by Nilamber and Pitamber Bhogta, attacked Raghubar Dayal, who had sided with the British, at Chainpur. Then they caused heavy destruction at Lesliganj. Lt. Graham was not able to suppress the revolt with only 50 people on his side, and rebels besieged Lt. Graham in the house of Raghubar Dayal.

In December 1857, two companies under Major Cotter arrived and were able to capture Devi Baksh Rai. To suppress further revolts, Commissioner Dalton arrived in Palamu from Ranchi with Madras Infantry, Ramgarh cavalry and soldiers of the Pithoria Parganait on 21 January 1858. He and Graham attacked Palamu Fort, which was occupied by rebels. Nilamber and Pitamber were forced to flee due to the strength of British forces.

Edward Tuite Dalton got Babu Kunwar Singh's letter to Nilambar and Naklait Majhi, who had asked for immediate help. Dalton planned to suppress the rebellion prior to the help of Kunwar Singh. Nilamber and Pitamber continued to fight against the British, by hiding in forests. Eventually they were arrested and hanged on 28 March 1859 by British forces in Lesliganj.

== Commemoration ==
- Nilamber-Pitamber University
- Indian Institute of Management Ranchi honored the valiant heroes in 2024 by renaming its primary academic buildings (previously AB-1 & AB-2) as Nilamber Block & Pitamber Block. These blocks, now integral to IIM Ranchi’s landscape, embody not only architectural significance but serve as perpetual reminders of the enduring spirit of India’s freedom fighters.
