= Garhwa Assembly constituency =

Constituency of the Jharkhand legislative assembly in India

Coordinates: 24.16°N 83.80°E

Garhwa
- Constituency No. 80 for the Jharkhand Legislative Assembly

Constituency details
- Country: India
- Region: East India
- State: Jharkhand
- District: Garhwa
- Lok Sabha constituency: Palamu
- Established: 2000
- Total electors: 366,065
- Reservation: None

Member of Legislative Assembly
- 5th Jharkhand Legislative Assembly
- Incumbent Satyendra Nath Tiwari
- Party: Bhartiya Janta Party
- Elected year: 2024

Garhwa Assembly constituency is one of the 81 Vidhan Sabha (Legislative Assembly) constituencies of Jharkhand state in eastern India.

== Overview ==
Garhwa (constituency number 80) is one of the two Jharkhand Vidhan Sabha constituencies in Garhwa district. It is one of the Assembly segments of the Palamu Lok Sabha constituency along with 5 other segments, namely, Bhawanathpur in this district and Daltonganj, Bishrampur, Chhatarpur and Hussainabad in Palamu district.

== Members of Legislative Assembly ==
| Year | Name | Party |
Bihar Legislative Assembly
Before 1957: see Hussainabad cum Garhwa constituency
| 1957 | Rajeshwari Saroj Das | Indian National Congress |
| 1962 | Gopi Nath Singh | Swatantra Party |
| 1967 | L. Prasad | Indian National Congress |
| 1969 | Gopi Nath Singh | Bharatiya Jana Sangh |
| 1972 | Awadh Kishore Tiwari | Indian National Congress |
| 1977 | Vinod N. Dixit | Janata Party |
| 1980 | Yugal Kishore Pandey | Indian National Congress |
| 1985 | Gopi Nath Singh | Bharatiya Janata Party |
| 1990 | Gopi Nath Singh | Bharatiya Janata Party |
| 1995 | Girinath Singh | Janata Dal |
| 2000 | Girinath Singh | Rashtriya Janata Dal |
Jharkhand Legislative Assembly
| 2005 | Girinath Singh | Rashtriya Janata Dal |
| 2009 | Satyendra Nath Tiwari | Jharkhand Vikas Morcha |
| 2014 | Satyendra Nath Tiwari | Bharatiya Janata Party |
| 2019 | Mithilesh Kumar Thakur | Jharkhand Mukti Morcha |
| 2024 | Satyendra Nath Tiwari | Bharatiya Janata Party |

== Election results ==
=== Assembly election 2024 ===
2024 Jharkhand Legislative Assembly election: Garhwa
| Party | Candidate | Votes | % | ±% |
|---|---|---|---|---|
| BJP | Satyendra Nath Tiwari | 133,109 | 45.40% | ▲10.74 |
| JMM | Mithilesh Kumar Thakur | 1,16,356 | 39.68% | ▼4.78 |
| SP | Girinath Singh | 8,096 | 2.76% | New |
| BSP | Ajay Kumar Choudhary | 7,722 | 2.63% | ▼1.80 |
| Independent | Rabindra Kumar Singh | 4,502 | 1.54% | New |
| Independent | Ram Payare Pal | 4,092 | 1.40% | New |
| ASP(KR) | Law Kumar Singh | 3,202 | 1.09% | New |
| NOTA | None of the Above | 937 | 0.32% | ▼0.08 |
| Margin of victory | | 16,753 | 5.71% | ▼4.09 |
| Turnout | | 2,93,209 | 69.88% | ▲4.33 |
| Registered electors | | 4,19,614 | | ▲14.63 |
| BJP gain from JMM | | Swing | ▲0.93 | |

=== Assembly election 2019 ===
2019 Jharkhand Legislative Assembly election: Garhwa
| Party | Candidate | Votes | % | ±% |
|---|---|---|---|---|
| JMM | Mithilesh Kumar Thakur | 106,681 | 44.46% | ▲21.09 |
| BJP | Satyendra Nath Tiwari | 83,159 | 34.66% | ▼2.28 |
| BSP | Birendra Prasad | 10,638 | 4.43% | ▲1.04 |
| AITC | Mandip Mallah | 7,368 | 3.07% | New |
| AIMIM | Md. Najibuddin Khan | 6,231 | 2.60% | New |
| JVM(P) | Suraj Prasad Gupta | 5,852 | 2.44% | ▲1.08 |
| Independent | Bihari Vishwakarma | 5,339 | 2.23% | New |
| NOTA | None of the Above | 953 | 0.40% | ▼0.14 |
| Margin of victory | | 23,522 | 9.80% | ▼0.88 |
| Turnout | | 2,39,930 | 65.54% | ▼2.27 |
| Registered electors | | 3,66,065 | | ▲21.94 |
| JMM gain from BJP | | Swing | ▲7.52 | |

=== Assembly election 2014 ===
2014 Jharkhand Legislative Assembly election: Garhwa
| Party | Candidate | Votes | % | ±% |
|---|---|---|---|---|
| BJP | Satyendra Nath Tiwari | 75,196 | 36.94% | ▲28.15 |
| RJD | Girinath Singh | 53,441 | 26.25% | ▼0.68 |
| JMM | Mithilesh Kumar Thakur | 47,579 | 23.37% | ▲13.92 |
| BSP | Md. Rostam Ali Ansari | 6,902 | 3.39% | New |
| JVM(P) | Virendra Sav | 2,771 | 1.36% | ▼32.28 |
| Independent | Babanu Singh | 2,580 | 1.27% | New |
| Communist Party of India (Marxist Leninist) Liberation | Virendra Choudhary | 1,839 | 0.90% | ▼3.65 |
| NOTA | None of the Above | 1,100 | 0.54% | New |
| Margin of victory | | 21,755 | 10.69% | ▲3.98 |
| Turnout | | 2,03,562 | 67.81% | ▲7.58 |
| Registered electors | | 3,00,191 | | ▲20.53 |
| BJP gain from JVM(P) | | Swing | ▲3.30 | |

=== Assembly election 2009 ===
2009 Jharkhand Legislative Assembly election: Garhwa
| Party | Candidate | Votes | % | ±% |
|---|---|---|---|---|
| JVM(P) | Satyendra Nath Tiwari | 50,474 | 33.64% | New |
| RJD | Girinath Singh | 40,412 | 26.94% | ▲4.23 |
| JMM | Mithilesh Kumar Thakur | 14,180 | 9.45% | ▼0.09 |
| BJP | Alakh Nath Pandey | 13,191 | 8.79% | New |
| Communist Party of India (Marxist Leninist) Liberation | Kali Charan Mahto | 6,830 | 4.55% | ▲1.95 |
| AJSU | Anil Kumar Sah | 6,665 | 4.44% | New |
| NJSM | Rajesh Kumar (Garhwa) | 2,298 | 1.53% | New |
| Margin of victory | | 10,062 | 6.71% | ▲1.07 |
| Turnout | | 1,50,022 | 60.24% | ▼4.33 |
| Registered electors | | 2,49,060 | | ▲6.21 |
| JVM(P) gain from RJD | | Swing | ▲10.94 | |

=== Assembly election 2005 ===
2005 Jharkhand Legislative Assembly election: Garhwa
| Party | Candidate | Votes | % | ±% |
|---|---|---|---|---|
| RJD | Girinath Singh | 34,374 | 22.71% | ▼21.98 |
| JD(U) | Sairaj Ahmed Ansari | 25,841 | 17.07% | New |
| BSP | Anil Sao | 18,225 | 12.04% | ▲3.99 |
| JMM | Tulsi Singh | 14,439 | 9.54% | New |
| INC | Amarit Sukla | 13,392 | 8.85% | ▲5.58 |
| RSMD | Ram Charitra Choudhary | 6,088 | 4.02% | New |
| Communist Party of India (Marxist Leninist) Liberation | Jitendra Kumar Chandrabansi | 3,938 | 2.60% | New |
| Margin of victory | | 8,533 | 5.64% | ▼6.40 |
| Turnout | | 1,51,390 | 64.56% | ▲10.90 |
| Registered electors | | 2,34,487 | | ▲24.30 |
| RJD hold | | Swing | ▼21.98 | |

=== Assembly election 2000 ===
2000 Bihar Legislative Assembly election: Garhwa
| Party | Candidate | Votes | % | ±% |
|---|---|---|---|---|
| RJD | Girinath Singh | 45,239 | 44.69% | New |
| BJP | Shyam Narayan Dubey | 33,057 | 32.65% | New |
| BSP | Ahmad Ali | 8,146 | 8.05% | New |
| SP | Ram Charitra Choudhary | 4,559 | 4.50% | New |
| INC | Samsuddin Ansari | 3,309 | 3.27% | New |
| Independent | Baliwant Pandey | 3,244 | 3.20% | New |
| CPI | Ganesh Singh | 1,838 | 1.82% | New |
| Margin of victory | | 12,182 | 12.03% | |
| Turnout | | 1,01,232 | 54.67% | |
| Registered electors | | 1,88,639 | | |
| RJD win (new seat) | | | | |

== See also ==
- Garhwa
