= Bhawanathpur Assembly constituency =

Constituency of the Jharkhand legislative assembly in India

Coordinates: 24.39°N 83.57°E

Bhawanathpur
- Constituency No. 81 for the Jharkhand Legislative Assembly

Constituency details
- Country: India
- Region: East India
- State: Jharkhand
- District: Garhwa
- Lok Sabha constituency: Palamu
- Established: 2000
- Total electors: 378,363
- Reservation: None

Member of Legislative Assembly
- 5th Jharkhand Legislative Assembly
- Incumbent Anant Pratap Deo
- Party: JMM
- Alliance: MGB
- Elected year: 2024

Bhawanathpur is one of the 81 Vidhan Sabha (Legislative Assembly) constituencies of Jharkhand state in eastern India.

== Overview ==
Bhawanathpur (constituency number 81) is one of the two Jharkhand Vidhan Sabha constituencies in Garhwa district. It is one of the Assembly segments of the Palamu Lok Sabha constituency along with 5 other segments, namely, Garhwa in this district and Daltonganj, Bishrampur, Chhatarpur and Hussainabad in Palamu district.

== Members of the Legislative Assembly ==
Year	Name	Party
Bihar Legislative Assembly
Before 1957: Constituency did not exist
1957	Jadunandan Tiwari (Note: Two member constituency)	Indian National Congress
1957	Ramdini Chamar	Indian National Congress
1962	Shankar Pratap Deo	Swatantra Party
1967	Shankar Pratap Deo	Indian National Congress
1969	Hemendra Pratap	Samyukta Socialist Party
1972	Shankar Pratap Deo	Indian National Congress
1977	Ram Chandra Prasad Keshri	Janata Party
1980	Shankar Pratap Deo	Indian National Congress
1985	Raj Rajendra Pratap Deo	Indian National Congress
1990	Girwar Pandey	Janata Dal
1995	Girwar Pandey	Janata Dal
2000	Ram Chandra Prasad Keshri	Samata Party
Jharkhand Legislative Assembly
2005	Bhanu Pratap Sahi	All India Forward Bloc
2009	Anant Pratap Deo	Indian National Congress
2014	Bhanu Pratap Sahi	Navjawan Sangharsh Morcha
2019	Bhanu Pratap Sahi	Bharatiya Janata Party
2024	Anant Pratap Deo	Jharkhand Mukti Morcha

== Election results ==
=== Assembly election 2024 ===
2024 Jharkhand Legislative Assembly election: Bhawanathpur
Party	Candidate	Votes	%	±%
JMM	Anant Pratap Deo	146,265	48.49%	New
BJP	Bhanu Pratap Shahi	1,24,803	41.37%	▲3.48
Independent	Rahul Prasad Gupta	5,946	1.97%	New
Independent	Rajesh Baitha	5,087	1.69%	New
BSP	Pankaj Kumar	3,744	1.24%	▼21.03
Independent	Bisheswar Mehta	2,861	0.95%	New
Independent	Ram Naresh Yadav	1,827	0.61%	New
NOTA	None of the Above	1,244	0.41%	▼0.43
Margin of victory		21,462	7.12%	▼8.50
Turnout		3,01,643	68.51%	▲0.98
Registered electors		4,40,321		▲16.38
JMM gain from BJP		Swing	▲10.60	

=== Assembly election 2019 ===
2019 Jharkhand Legislative Assembly election: Bhawanathpur
Party	Candidate	Votes	%	±%
BJP	Bhanu Pratap Sahi	96,818	37.89%	▲11.36
BSP	Sogra Bibi	56,914	22.28%	▲0.80
Independent	Anant Pratap Deo	53,050	20.76%	New
INC	Kedar Prasad Yadav	10,895	4.26%	New
JVM(P)	Vijay Kumar Keshri	3,876	1.52%	▼3.82
LJP	Rekha Choubey	3,625	1.42%	New
CPI	Rameshwar Prasad Akela	3,565	1.40%	New
NOTA	None of the Above	2,163	0.85%	New
Margin of victory		39,904	15.62%	▲14.36
Turnout		2,55,498	67.53%	▼0.64
Registered electors		3,78,363		▲21.68
BJP gain from NJSM		Swing	▲10.10	

=== Assembly election 2014 ===
2014 Jharkhand Legislative Assembly election: Bhawanathpur
Party	Candidate	Votes	%	±%
NJSM	Bhanu Pratap Sahi	58,908	27.79%	▲7.17
BJP	Anant Pratap Deo	56,247	26.54%	New
BSP	Tahir Ansari	45,523	21.48%	▲12.41
SP	Kedar Prasad Yadav	20,546	9.69%	New
JVM(P)	Ramchandra Keshri	11,308	5.34%	New
Rashtriya Mazdoor Kisan Prajatantrik Party	Shashi Kumar Dwivedi	3,366	1.59%	New
Independent	Lakshman Singh	3,123	1.47%	New
Margin of victory		2,661	1.26%	▼12.80
Turnout		2,11,953	68.16%	▲6.13
Registered electors		3,10,943		▲22.31
NJSM gain from INC		Swing	▼6.89	

=== Assembly election 2009 ===
2009 Jharkhand Legislative Assembly election: Bhawanathpur
Party	Candidate	Votes	%	±%
INC	Anant Pratap Deo	54,690	34.68%	▲14.22
NJSM	Bhanu Pratap Sahi	32,522	20.62%	New
CPI(ML)L	Sogara Bibi	20,901	13.25%	New
BSP	Kedar Prasad Yadav	14,293	9.06%	▼1.05
JD(U)	Ramchandra Keshri	11,546	7.32%	New
RJD	Basant Kumar Yadav	3,026	1.92%	▼9.17
Independent	Rakesh Kumar Chaubey	2,118	1.34%	New
Margin of victory		22,168	14.06%	▲10.93
Turnout		1,57,697	62.03%	▲6.70
Registered electors		2,54,216		▼12.88
INC gain from AIFB		Swing	▲11.09	

=== Assembly election 2005 ===
2005 Jharkhand Legislative Assembly election: Bhawanathpur
Party	Candidate	Votes	%	±%
AIFB	Bhanu Pratap Sahi	38,090	23.59%	New
INC	Anant Pratap Deo	33,040	20.46%	▼4.33
RJD	Dr. Moh. Yasin Ansari	17,897	11.09%	▼11.72
BSP	Dharmendra Pratap Deo	16,325	10.11%	▲5.03
BJP	Sharda Mahesh Pratap Deo	8,826	5.47%	New
SP	Sheo Pujan Yadav	8,006	4.96%	New
LJP	Giriwar Pandey	7,658	4.74%	New
Margin of victory		5,050	3.13%	▼3.78
Turnout		1,61,448	55.33%	▼4.04
Registered electors		2,91,800		▲43.21
AIFB gain from SAP		Swing	▼8.11	

=== Assembly election 2000 ===
2000 Bihar Legislative Assembly election: Bhawanathpur
Party	Candidate	Votes	%	±%
SAP	Ramchandra Keshri	38,350	31.70%	New
INC	Anant Pratap Deo	29,995	24.79%	New
RJD	Dr. Md. Yasin Ansari	27,593	22.81%	New
JD(U)	Giriwar Pandey	9,308	7.69%	New
BSP	Gopi Chandra Ram	6,148	5.08%	New
Communist Party of India (Marxist Leninist) Liberation	Lakshman Singh	3,262	2.70%	New
JMM	Surendra Prasad Gupta	1,654	1.37%	New
Margin of victory		8,355	6.91%	
Turnout		1,20,977	60.45%	
Registered electors		2,03,757		
SAP win (new seat)				

== See also ==
- Garhwa district
- List of constituencies of the Jharkhand Legislative Assembly
