= Kushwaha Shivpujan Mehta =

Indian politician

Member of Jharkhand Legislative Assembly
- In office 23 December 2014 – 21 December 2019
- Preceded by: Sanjay Kumar Singh Yadav
- Succeeded by: Kamlesh Kumar Singh
- Constituency: Hussainabad

Personal details
- Born: 01/01/1972 Dema, Hariharganj Palamu
- Party: Bahujan Samaj Party, All Jharkhand Students Union (2019-Present)
- Children: 2
- Parent: Ramadhar Mehta (father)
- Occupation: Agriculture and Social Service, Politician
- As of 6 November 2019

Kushwaha Shivpujan Mehta is the Jharkhand state legislative assembly member from Hussainabad (Vidhan Sabha constituency). In the 2014 general election, he was elected as MLA as Bahujan Samaj Party candidate. He joined All Jharkhand Students Union in November 2019, and is now District level chairman of All India Kushwaha Mahasabha, Hazaribagh from 15 December 2020.

He has 5 criminal cases against him with charges of criminal intimidation, bribery, voluntarily causing grievous hurt etc.

== Biography ==
Mehta served as Member of Jharkhand Legislative Assembly from Hussainabad Assembly constituency. As an MLA, he brought a private resolution in Jharkhand Assembly for setting up industry on the land of Japla Cement Factory, in Hussainabad block of Palamu district. In 2019, unable to get assurance of government on his demand, he tendered resignation in Jharkhand Assembly. In the same year, Jharkhand unit of Bahujan Samaj Party dismissed him from party for alleged anti-party activities. Mehta was sole MLA of BSP in Jharkhand then. While the BSP officials alleged him for distancing himself from the party workers and his constituency, Mehta denied the allegations. Mehta even admitted before speaker of Jharkhand Legislative Assembly Dinesh Oraon that problems of his constituency is not solved, despite the fact that he raised those issues on the floor of Legislative Assembly for a number of times. In 2023, an MP-MLA special court of Jharkhand found Mehta guilty in a case, where latter along with his supporters was accused of protesting and blocking the traffic, without permission from authorities. As per news reports, Mehta and his supporters also misbehaved with police officers. The court, in its verdict, barred them from contesting elections for six years besides monetary penalty. During the verdict, Mehta was serving as Vice President of All Jharkhand Students Union political party.

In 2019, Mehta was also accused by a woman teacher of government middle school located in Hussainabad of giving sexual advances through the principal of her school Rajeshwar Mehta. Although, Mehta denied the charges and himself alleged some of his rivals in state education department of plotting to defame him. Earlier, before joining All Jharkhand Students Union, it was reported that Mehta will join Bhartiya Janata Party, after being expelled from BSP. In 2019, he also met former Jharkhand Chief Minister, Raghubar Das in Jamshedpur. But later, he decided to go with All Jharkhand Students Union (AJSU).

In 2022, Mehta was also involved in activism in 'justice for Sujit Mehta movement'. Sujit Mehta was husband of a member of Zila Parishad in Aurangabad district of Bihar, who was murdered by hired shooters in a revenge attack. This incident resulted in caste based clashes in between members of Kushwaha (Koeri) and Rajput caste. The caste based clashes first erupted on social media and later spread out on streets, with many areas of Aurangabad and bordering Palamu district of Jharkhand engulfed by it. Mehta organised his justice rally (Nyay Yatra), keeping immediate demands in front of government to arrest the culprits and dismiss Police Station incharge of the area. However, alleging Mehta of making controversial statements against the Forward Castes, a caste body of Rajput community also organised counter protests and even submitted memorandum before local police in-charge to arrest Mehta.
