= Rajhara =

- Village
- Location in Jharkhand, India Rajhara (India)
- Coordinates: 24.18°N 84.03°E
- Country: India
- State: Jharkhand
- District: Palamu
- Elevation: 201 m (659 ft)

Languages
  - Official: Hindi, Urdu
- Time zone: UTC+5:30 (IST)
- PIN: 822124
- Vehicle registration: JH
- Website: palamu.nic.in

For the town in the state of Chhattisgarh, see Dalli Rajhara

Rajhara is a town in Palamu district in the Indian state of Jharkhand. It is located 3 km away from its taluka (Padwa block) headquarter and 18 km from its district headquarter Medininagar. This place is famous because of National Highway 139 (India). situated on the bank of the River called Labji.

== Geography ==
Rajhara is located at 24.18°N 84.03°E. It has an average elevation of 201 metres (659 ft).

== Transport ==
Rajhara is the terminal point of NH 98 and lies about 17 kilometres (11 mi) north of Daltonganj. Ranchi is about 170 kilometres (110 mi) from Rajhara.

== Economy ==
The projects of the Rajhara Area of Central Coalfields are: Rajhara opencast project, Tetariakhar opencast project.
