= Haidernagar block =

Haidernagar Haidarnagar
- Block
- Nickname: Haidarnagar (town)
- Location in Jharkhand, India Haidernagar (India)
- Coordinates: 24.5071762°N 83.8672042°E
- Country: India
- State: Jharkhand
- District: Palamu
- Block: Haidernagar
- Founder: Saiyed Nabi Ali (Son of Nawab Haidar Ali khan )

Government
  - MLA: Kamlesh Kumar Singh, NCP candidate

Population (2011)
  - Total: 74,031

Languages
  - Official: Magahi, Hindi
- Time zone: UTC+5:30 (IST)
- PIN: 822115
- Vehicle registration: JH 03
- Website: palamu.nic.in/Haidernagar.html

Haidernagar, informally known as Babhandih, is one of the administrative blocks of Palamu district, Jharkhand state, India.

== History ==
Haidarnagar is a Rajput-dominated region since 1770 when the Mahthan Rajputs hailing from Nabinagar captured the town. The nawab of Eshaknagar made a treaty with Rajput chief Babu Shiv Dayal Singh to grant zamindari rights and change the name of Eshaknagar to Babhandih. According to the treaty, 24 out of 55 villages were granted to Shiv Dayal Singh. Later the estate got divided into Babu Sahebs of Babhandih, Bilaspur, and Golhana Haidernagar. The nawabs lost honour and value among the locals. Babu Tapeswari Singh went to study law from a college in Bihar. His son, Biseswar Dayal Singh, was prominent name in the area and resisted the British for measuring net sown area in his estate until 1942 when it was finally done. He was active in politics and the freedom struggle, inspired by Gandhian vision he led the workers strike at Dalmia Paper Factory. He donated acres of lands during the bhoodan gramdan movement of Vinoba Bhave. The descendants of the main branch of Zamindar family lives in Babhandih.

== Demographics ==
Religion in Haidernagar block (2011)
Religion	Percent
Hinduism	80.33%
Islam	19.56%
Other or not stated	0.11%

At the time of the 2011 census, Haidernagar block had a population of 74,031. Haidernagar block had a sex ratio of 916 females per 1000 males and a literacy rate of 66.55%: 77.47% for males and 54.60% for females. 12,073 (16.31%) were under 7 years of age. The entire population lived in rural areas. Scheduled Castes and Scheduled Tribes were 23,777 (32.12%) and 33 (0.04%) of the population, respectively.

Languages of Haidernagar block (2011)
1. Hindi (76.0%)
2. Urdu (14.7%)
3. Magahi (9.27%)
4. Others (0.06%)

== See also ==
- Palamu Loksabha constituency
- Jharkhand Legislative Assembly
