= Daltonganj Coalfield =

- Location in Jharkhand

Location
- Location: Jharkhand, India; 23°48′N 85°45′E

Owner
- Company: Central Coalfields Limited
- Website: Central Coalfields
- Acquired: 1975

Daltonganj Coalfield is located in Palamu district in the Indian state of Jharkhand.

== Overview ==
There are three coalfields in the valley of the North Koel River: Auranga, Hutar and Daltonganj.

The Auranga Coalfield, spread across 240 km^{2}, has coal of inferior quality, which is used mainly in cement kilns and brick kilns. The majority of coal in the Hutar Coalfield, spread across 200 km^{2}, is of inferior quality. The coal available near Rajhara from the Daltonganj coalfield, spread over 51 km^{2}, is of semi-anthracite type. Elsewhere, it is non-coking coal of inferior variety.

== Reserves ==
Total geological reserves of non-coking coal is 2997.11 million tonnes in Auranga Coalfield, 249.82 million tonnes in Hutar coalfield and 143.96 million tonnes in Daltonganj coalfield.

== Projects ==
CCL Operational Area	Projects
Rajhara Area	Rajhara opencast project, Tetariakhar opencast project.
