= Birdhaur =

Village in Jharkhand, India

Birdhaur (sometimes spelled Birdhawar) is a village in Mohammadganj block, in the Palamau district of the Indian state of Jharkhand.
