= Majuraha =

Village located in Hussainabad Tehsil of Palamu district in Jharkhand, India

Majuraha is a village located in Hussainabad Tehsil of Palamu district in Jharkhand, India, one among the 83 villages of Pipra Block of Palamu district.
