= Ramgarh block =

Horanda Alias Ramgarh
- Block
- Location in jharkhand, India
- Coordinates: 23.88°N 83.95°E
- Country: India
- State: Jharkhand
- District: Palamu
- Block: Ramgarh Block

Government
  - MLA: Alok Chaurasiya (BJP)

Population (2001)
  - Total: 86,139

Languages
  - Official: Hindi
  - Other Languages: Magahi ,Nagpuri ,Kurukh
- Time zone: UTC+5:30 (IST)
- PIN: 822132
- Website: palamu.nic.in

Ramgarh block is one of the administrative blocks of Palamu district, Jharkhand, India. It is also known as Horanda.

Horanda is a part of Daltonganj (Vidhan Sabha constituency).

== Languages ==
Languages spoken here include Asuri, an Austroasiatic language spoken by approximately 17 000 in India, largely in the southern part of Palamu; and Bhojpuri, a tongue in the Bihari language group with almost 40 000 000 speakers, written in both the Devanagari and Kaithi scripts.

== See also ==
- Daltonganj Assembly
- Palamu Loksabha constituency
- Jharkhand Legislative Assembly
- Jharkhand
- Palamu
