= Patan block =

Patan
- Block

- Location in jharkhand, India
- Coordinates: 24.20°N 84.17°E
- Country: India
- State: Jharkhand
- District: Palamu

Government
  - Zila Parishad Member: Jai shankar Kumar Singh -Sangram Singh
- Elevation: 216 m (709 ft)

Population (2001)
  - Total: 146,139

Languages
  - Official: Magahi, Hindi
- Time zone: UTC+5:30 (IST)
- PIN: 822123
- Website: palamu.nic.in/patan.html

Patan is one of the administrative blocks/Tehsil/ Taluka of Palamu district, Jharkhand state, India. According to the census of 2001 the block has 25,186 households with a population of 146,139. The block has 186 villages.

Patan is a part of Chhatarpur (Jharkhand Assembly constituency).

== Demographics ==
Religion in Patan block (2011)
| Religion | Percent |
| Hinduism | 87.82% |
| Islam | 11.40% |
| Other or not stated | 0.78% |

At the time of the 2011 census, Patan block had a population of 134,536. Patan block had a sex ratio of 920 females per 1000 males and a literacy rate of 63.32%: 74.35% for males and 51.33% for females. 22,445 (16.68%) were under 7 years of age. The entire population lived in rural areas. Scheduled Castes and Scheduled Tribes were 37,414 (27.81%) and 16,551 (12.30%) of the population, respectively.

Languages of Patan block (2011)
1. Hindi (49.86%)
2. Magahi (43.50%)
3. Urdu (5.15%)
4. Kurukh (1.37%)
5. Others (0.12%)

== See also ==
- Chhatarpur Assembly
- Palamu Loksabha constituency
- Jharkhand Legislative Assembly
- Jharkhand
- Palamu
