= Satbarwa block =

Satbarwa
- Block

- Location in jharkhand, India
- Coordinates: 23.92°N 84.25°E
- Country: India
- State: Jharkhand
- District: Palamu
- Block: Satbarwa

Government
  - MLA: Harikrishn Singh; Bharatiya Janata Party

Population (2001)
  - Total: 146,139

Languages
  - Official: Nagpuri, Hindi
- Time zone: UTC+5:30 (IST)
- PIN: 822126
- Website: palamu.nic.in/Satbarwa.html

Satbarwa block is one of the administrative blocks of Palamu district, Jharkhand state, India. It is one of the important block/Taliuka in NH-75 (old numbering). According to census (2001), the block has 9,385 households with aggregate population of 52,541. The block has 58 villages.

== Demographics ==
Religion in Satbarwa block (2011)
Religion	Percent
Hinduism	82.29%
Islam	15.45%
Sarna	1.64%
Christianity	0.52%
Other or not stated	0.10%

At the time of the 2011 census, Satbarwa block had a population of 66,417. Satbarwa block had a sex ratio of 960 females per 1000 males and a literacy rate of 64.57%: 75.08% for males and 53.53% for females. 12,003 (18.07%) were under 7 years of age. The entire population lived in rural areas. Scheduled Castes and Scheduled Tribes were 16,432 (24.74%) and 17,880 (26.92%) of the population, respectively.

Languages of Satbarwa block (2011)
1. Hindi (53.6%)
2. Magahi (36.0%)
3. Urdu (8.81%)
4. Kurukh (1.46%)
5. Others (0.12%)

== See also ==
- Palamu Loksabha constituency
- Jharkhand Legislative Assembly
- Jharkhand
- Palamu
