= Sunitha (disambiguation) =

Sunita was a highly accomplished disciple of the Buddha. Sunitha or Sunita may also refer to:

== Arts and entertainment ==
- Sunita (novel), Magahi-language novel by Jaynath Pati

== People with the forename ==
- Sunitha (actress), a South Indian actress, also known as Kodai Mazhai Vidhya, who acted in Malayalam, Tamil, Kannada language films during the 1990s
- Sunitha Krishnan (born 1972), an Indian social activist and co-founder of Prajwala
- Sunitha Rao, an Indian-American professional tennis player
- Sunitha Sarathy, a playback singer, vocalist and performer of Indian and Western musical genres
- Sunitha Upadrashta, Indian playback singer, anchor and dubbing artist in Cinema of Andhra Pradesh|Tollywood
- Sunitha Varma, a South Indian actress who has performed in Telugu, Tamil, Kannada and Malayalam language films
- Sunitha Wickramasinghe, a professor of Haematology, the former Deputy Dean of the Imperial College School of Medicine
- Sunita Williams (born 1965), a United States Naval officer and a NASA astronaut
- Sunita Narain, Indian environmentalist and director of the Centre for Science and Environment
- Sunita Mani, Indian-American actress, dancer, and comedian

== People with the surname ==
- Paritala Sunitha, a member of the Legislative Assembly of the Indian state of Andhra Pradesh

== See also ==
- Sinitta
