= Hussainabad block =

Coordinates: 24.536°N 83.996°E

Hussainabad block is one of the administrative blocks of Palamu district, Jharkhand state, India. According to census (2001), the block has 29,113 households with aggregate population of 177,013. The block has 183 villages. Its largest town is Hussainabad, also known as Japla.

== Demographics ==
Religion in Hussainabad block (2011)
Religion	Percent
Hinduism	89.08%
Islam	10.71%
Other or not stated	0.21%

At the time of the 2011 census, Hussainabad block had a population of 162,290. Hussainabad block had a sex ratio of 931 females per 1000 males and a literacy rate of 65.58%: 76.68% for males and 53.63% for females. 28,195 (17.37%) were under 7 years of age. 29,241 (18.02%) lived in urban areas. Scheduled Castes and Scheduled Tribes were 57,266 (35.29%) and 2,390 (1.47%) of the population, respectively.

Languages of Hussainabad block (2011)
1. Magahi (74.8%)
2. Hindi (18.1%)
3. Urdu (6.79%)
4. Others (0.36%)
