= Pandu block =

Pandu
- Block

- Location in jharkhand, India
- Coordinates: 24.32°N 83.96°E
- Country: India
- State: Jharkhand
- District: Palamu
- Block: Pandu

Government
  - MLA: Ramachandra Chandravansi; Bharatiya Janata Party

Population (2001)
  - Total: 74,464

Languages
  - Official: Magahi, Hindi
- Time zone: UTC+5:30 (IST)
- PIN: 822124
- Website: palamu.nic.in/pandu.html

Pandu block is one of the administrative blocks of Palamu district, Jharkhand state, India. According to census (2001), the block has a population of 74,464. The block has 71 villages. It is named for Pandu.

Name of Panchayat	No of Village	Population
Lumba Satbahini	6	5238
Lahar Banjari	3	5598
Murma Kala	3	5415
Murma Khurd	4	4569
Tisibar Kala	5	5055
Dala Kala	7	4783
Fuliya	11	4376
Kutmu	1	5994
Pandu	4	5834
Mahugawan	6	5513
Sildili	7	5349
Musikhap	5	5191
Kajru Kala	3	5304
Ratnag	6	6269

Now one more Block, Untari Road has been created from Pandu Block.

There is one Government Hospital, and many Registered Pvt Clinics.

One Branch of Vananchal Gramin bank is taking care of financial needs for the People of this reason.

There exists following facilities in Block Headquarter Pandu:

- BSNL Telephone exchange (Burnt by Maoists several years ago)
- Post Office
- Police Station
- Kalyan High School(Govt)
- Kasturba Gandhi Girls High School (Govt Residential)
- Priyadarshini Indira Gandhi Girls High School (Govt. Aided)
- Government Middle School
- Girls Middle School(Govt.)
- Gyan Jyoti Public School
- SS Public School
- Gyan Niketan Public School
- Saraswati Shishu Mandir (school)
- One PYKKA center is functioning under able leadership of Ktidashree Sanjay Pandey

Pandu is well connected throu Bus from Garhwa, Daltonganj and Rehla.

Nearest Railway station is Untari Road - 12 km, Garwa Road - 15 km, Garhwa - 22 km, DaltonGanj 30 km (Ariel distance)

Nearest Airport is - Ranchi - 180 km, Patna - 187 km, Varanasi- 150 km

== Demographics ==
Religion in Pandu block (2011)
Religion	Percent
Hinduism	86.48%
Islam	13.38%
Other or not stated	0.14%

At the time of the 2011 census, Pandu block had a population of 67,886. Pandu block had a sex ratio of 916 females per 1000 males and a literacy rate of 65.29%: 77.19% for males and 52.24% for females. 11,338 (16.70%) were under 7 years of age. The entire population lived in rural areas. Scheduled Castes and Scheduled Tribes were 19,519 (28.75%) and 522 (0.77%) of the population, respectively.

Languages of Pandu block (2011)
1. Hindi (77.16%)
2. Magahi (18.15%)
3. Urdu (4.53%)
4. Others (0.16%)

== See also ==
- Palamu Lok Sabha constituency
- Jharkhand Legislative Assembly
- Jharkhand
- Palamu
