= Satyendra Nath Tiwari =

Indian politician

Member of the Jharkhand Legislative Assembly
- Incumbent
- Assumed office 2024
- Constituency: Garhwa
- In office 2009–2014
- In office 2014–2019
- Incumbent
- Assumed office 2024

Personal details
- Born: 1964 Garhwa, Garhwa district, Jharkhand, India
- Party: Bharatiya Janata Party (2014–present); Jharkhand Vikas Morcha (Prajatantrik) (until 2014)
- Spouse(s): Mira Devi, 1984
- Parent: Ramkrishna Tiwari (father)
- Education: B.Sc.
- Alma mater: Ganesh Lal Agrawal College, Ranchi University
- Occupation: Politician

Satyendra Nath Tiwari (born 31 December 1964) is an Indian politician from Jharkhand. He is a three-time MLA from Garhwa Assembly constituency in Garhwa District. He won the 2024 Jharkhand Legislative Assembly election, representing the Bharatiya Janata Party.

== Early life and education ==
Tiwari is from Garhwa, Jharkhand. He is the son of Ramkrishna Tiwari. He completed his B.Sc. in 1987 at Ganesh Lal Agrawal College, Daltonganj which is affiliated with Ranchi University. Earlier, he studied at Government High School, Daltonganj and passed the examinations conducted by the Bihar School Examination Council, Patna, in 1982.

== Career ==
Tiwari won from Garhwa Assembly constituency representing Bharatiya Janata Party in the 2024 Jharkhand Legislative Assembly election. He polled 1,33,109 votes and defeated his nearest rival, Mithilesh Kumar Thakur of the Jharkhand Mukti Morcha party, by a margin of 16,753 votes. He first became an MLA winning the 2009 Jharkhand Legislative Assembly election representing Jharkhand Vikas Morcha (Prajatantrik) and defeated Girinath Singh of Rashtriya Janata Dal, by a margin of 16,753 votes. He later joined BJP and retained the seat on BJP ticket in the next election in the 2014 Jharkhand Legislative Assembly election. He won for the third time in the 2024 Assembly election. In the 2019 Assembly election he lost to Mithilesh Kumar Thakur of JMM by a margin of 23,522 votes.
