= Nawa Bazar block =

Nawa Bazar
- Block

- Location in jharkhand, India
- Coordinates: 24.28°N 84.10°E
- Country: India
- State: Jharkhand
- District: Palamu
- Block: Nawa Bazar

Government
  - MLA: Radha Krishna Kishore; Bharatiya Janata Party

Population (2001)
  - Total: 86,139

Languages
  - Official: Magahi, Hindi
- Time zone: UTC+5:30 (IST)
- PIN: 822113
- Website: palamu.nic.in/NawaBazar.html

Nawa Bazar is one of the administrative community development block of Palamu district, Jharkhand state, India.

== Demographics ==
Religion in Nawa Bazar block (2011)
Religion	Percent
Hinduism	88.40%
Islam	11.32%
Other or not stated	0.28%

At the time of the 2011 census, Nawa Bazar block had a population of 50,345. Nawa Bazar block had a sex ratio of 917 females per 1000 males and a literacy rate of 59.96%: 71.09% for males and 47.84% for females. 8,607 (17.10%) were under 7 years of age. The entire population lived in rural areas. Scheduled Castes and Scheduled Tribes were 14,325 (28.45%) and 7,869 (15.63%) of the population, respectively.

Languages of Nawa Bazar block (2011)
1. Hindi (89.7%)
2. Urdu (6.41%)
3. Magahi (3.88%)
4. Others (0.05%)

== See also ==
- Palamu Loksabha constituency
- Jharkhand Legislative Assembly
- Jharkhand
- Palamu
