= Bhanu Pratap Shahi =

Indian politician

Bhanu Pratap Sahi

Member of Jharkhand Legislative Assembly
- In office 2014–2024
- Preceded by: Anant Pratap Deo
- Succeeded by: Anant Pratap Deo
- Constituency: Bhawanathpur

Member of Jharkhand Legislative Assembly
- In office 2005–2009Computer code
- Succeeded by: Anant Pratap Deo
- Constituency: Bhawanathpur

Personal details
- Party: Bharatiya Janata Party
- Occupation: Politician
- As of 23 October 2019

Bhanu Pratap Shahi is a member of Bharatiya Janata Party and member of Jharkhand Legislative Assembly. He belongs to surajbansi rajput clan.
