= Untari Road block =

Untari Road
- Block

- Location in jharkhand, India
- Coordinates: 24.34°N 83.86°E
- Country: India
- State: Jharkhand
- District: Palamu
- Block: Untari Road

Government
  - MLA: Ramchandra Chandravanshi; Bharatiya Janata Party

Population (2001)
  - Total: 86,139

Languages
  - Official: Magahi, Hindi
- Time zone: UTC+5:30 (IST)
- PIN: 822120
- Website: palamu.nic.in/UntariRoad.html

Untari Road Block is one of the administrative blocks of Palamu district, Jharkhand state, India.

== Demographics ==
Religion in Untari Road block (2011)
Religion	Percent
Hinduism	97.38%
Islam	2.43%
Other or not stated	0.19%

At the time of the 2011 census, Untari Road block had a population of 38,888. Untari Road block had a sex ratio of 906 females per 1000 males and a literacy rate of 61.50%: 74.47% for males and 47.10% for females. 6,591 (16.95%) were under 7 years of age. The entire population lived in rural areas. Scheduled Castes and Scheduled Tribes were 13,187 (33.91%) and 538 (1.38%) of the population, respectively.

Languages of Untari Road block (2011)
1. Hindi (94.06%)
2. Magahi (5.11%)
3. Others (0.83%)

== See also ==
- Palamu Loksabha constituency
- Jharkhand Legislative Assembly
- Jharkhand
- Palamu
