= Rupaundha =

Village in Jharkhand, India

Coordinates: 25°10′N 83°00′E

Rupaundha is a village located in Satbarwa Tehsil within the Palamu district of Jharkhand state, India. It is one of 58 villages in Satbarwa Block along with villages like Nawadih and Purnadih.

The Village's total population is 30 inhabitants (21 males, 9 females).
