= Bishrampur, Palamu =

Bishrampur
- City
- Location in Jharkhand, India Bishrampur (India)
- Coordinates: 24.263°N 83.924°E
- Country: India
- State: Jharkhand
- District: Palamu

Population (2011)
  - Total: 42,925

Languages
  - Official: Hindi, Santali
- Time zone: UTC+5:30 (IST)
- PIN: 822132
- telephone: 06584
- Vehicle registration: JH-03
- Literacy: 70.06%
- Website: www.palamu.nic.in

Bishrampur is a city and nagar parishad in Palamu district in the Indian state of Jharkhand.

== Geography ==
Bishrampur is located at 24.263°N 83.924°E. It has an average elevation of 207 m (679 ft).

== Demographics ==
As of 2011 India census, Bishrampur had a population of 42,925. Males constitute 52% of the population and females 48%. It has an average literacy rate of 70.06%, lower than the national average of 74.04%: male literacy is 81.32% and, female literacy is 57.65%. 16% of the population is under 6 years of age.
