= Naudiha Bazar =

Town in Jharkhand, India

- Naudiha Bazar Block
- Location in jharkhand, India Naudiha Bazar (India)
- Coordinates: 24.3774°N 84.2985°E
- Country: India
- State: Jharkhand
- District: Palamu
- Block: Naudiha Bazar block

Naudiha Bazar is a small town in the Indian state of Jharkhand. It is the headquarters of Palamu division and Palamu district, and subdivision Chhatarpur (Jharkhand Assembly constituency) and block of the Naudiha Bazar block.

== Geography ==
Naudiha Bazar is located at 24.3774°N 84.2985°E.

== Culture ==
Major Hindu and Muslim festivals are celebrated in Naudiha Bazar. Hindus and Muslims celebrate muharram, chhath and durga puja together.

== Temples ==
shiv Mandir is a temple situated in the center of Naudiha Bazar main market. Many people come here to worship Shiva on all day.

== See also ==
- Palamu Loksabha constituency
- Jharkhand Legislative Assembly
- Jharkhand
- Palamu
