= Laxmi Chandravansi Medical College and Hospital, Palamu =

Medical college in Jharkhand, India

- Type: Private
- Established: 2021; 5 years ago
- Affiliations: Ramchandra Chandravansi University
- Principal: Dr. Vivek Kashyap
- Students: Totals: MBBS - 100
- Location: Bishrampur, Palamu, Jharkhand
- Website: https://lcmch.in/

Laxmi Chandravansi Medical College and Hospital, Palamu, established in 2021, is a private medical college located at Bishrampur, Palamu district, Jharkhand. This college offers the Bachelor of Medicine and Surgery (MBBS) courses and has an annual intake capacity of 100. This college is affiliated with the Ramchandra Chandravansi University and recognized by the National Medical Commission.

== See also ==
- List of hospitals in India
