= Chainpur block, Palamu =

Chainpur
- Block

- Location in jharkhand, India Chainpur (India)
- Coordinates: 24.01°N 84.02°E
- Country: India
- State: Jharkhand
- District: Palamu
- Block: Chainpur

Government
  - MLA: Alok Chaurasiya, Bharatiya Janata Party

Population (2001)
  - Total: 224,423

Languages
  - Official: Bhojpuri, Hindi
- Time zone: UTC+5:30 (IST)
- PIN: 822110
- Vehicle registration: JH
- Website: http://palamu.nic.in/Chainpur.html

Chainpur block (Palamu district) is one of the administrative blocks of Palamu district, Jharkhand state, India. The block contains 35 panchayats. According to 2011 census

1	No. of households	47138
2	Geographical area	167274 Acre
3	Total population	224423
4	Total population (Male)	115412
5	Total population (Female)	109011
6	Total literates	109245
7	Total literate (male)	67189
8	Total Literate (female)	42056

== Demographics ==
Religion in Chainpur block (2011)
Religion	Percent
Hinduism	80.15%
Islam	16.55%
Christianity	1.36%
Sarna	1.31%
Other or not stated	0.63%

At the time of the 2011 census, Chainpur block had a population of 226,550. Chainpur block had a sex ratio of 942 females per 1000 males and a literacy rate of 57.74%: 69.00% for males and 45.75% for females. 41,648 (18.38%) were under 7 years of age. 21,701 (9.58%) lived in urban areas. Scheduled Castes and Scheduled Tribes were 47,671 (21.04%) and 41,451 (18.30%) of the population, respectively.

Languages of Chainpur block (2011)
1. Hindi (67.5%)
2. Pamulha (9.88%)
3. Urdu (9.05%)
4. Magahi (4.47%)
5. Bhojpuri (3.11%)
6. Sadri (2.77%)
7. Mundari (1.65%)
8. Kurukh (1.51%)
9. Others (0.08%)

== List of panchayats ==
- Rabada
- Khura Kalan
- Karso
- Bondi
- Salatua
- Buribir
- Ornar
- Bansdih
- Baraon
- Narsinghpur Pathara
- Kosiyara
- Patariya Khurd
- Purbdiha
- Lokeya
- Taleya Babhandih
- Mahugawan
- Bandua
- Jhariwa
- Shahpur (North)
- Shahpur (South)
- Chainpur
- Bhargawan
- Neura
- Semara
- Bedama Babhandih
- Nawadih
- Ramgarh
- Uldanda
- Chorhat
- Kankari
- Basariya Kalan
- Chando
- Awsane
- Bansdih Khurd
- Huttar

== Schools and college ==
- Greater S.L.A. School, (residential school) Birsanagar Shahpur
- Rotary (Anand Shankar)
- Gyan Sagar Public School
- St. Ignatius H/S School Kundpani
- St.Xavir Middle School Mahuwabathan
- SSGPH High School
- Climax Public School
- The Success Hub, Chainpur Block
- Oxford public school, new township chainpur shahpur

== See also ==
- Palamu Loksabha constituency
- Jharkhand Legislative Assembly
- Jharkhand
- Palamu
