= Rajhara Area =

- Location in Jharkhand Rajhara Area (India)
- Location: Daltonganj Coalfield, North Karanpura Coalfield; 24.1621°N 84.0442°E
- Company: Central Coalfields Limited
- Website: centralcoalfields.in/cmpny/hstry.php

Rajhara Area is one of the operational areas of the Central Coalfields located in the Palamu and Latehar districts in the state of Jharkhand, India.

== Mining activity ==
=== Mines and projects ===
Rajhara opencast mine is located in Daltonganj Coalfield, in Palamu district. It is 4 km from Kajri railway station on the Barkakana-Son Nagar line. Coal will be mined from 3 coal seams: Rajhara Top Seam with extractable reserve of 1.721 million tonnes, Rajhara Middle Seam with extractable reserve of 0.749 million tonnes and Rajhara Bottom Seam with extractable reserve of 13.139 million tonnes. The mine has a capacity of 0.75 million tonnes per year.

Rajhara mine was started in 1842 by Bengal Coal Company, making it one of the oldest mines in the country. The ownership of mine was transferred to Ram Sharan Das and Brothers in 1969 and subsequently, the mine was nationalised in 1973. It was initially worked by underground method but after nationalisation it was converted to an opencast mine to recover good quality reserves of coal. The mine is situated close to Sadabah River, a tributary of North Koel River. The mine was closed in October 2010 to avoid possibility of being flooded. Additionally, there were issues related to environmental clearance. With several corrective and precautionary measures for the safety of the mine, its environmental clearance was issued on 14 February 2019. The mine was reopened in the presence of V.D.Ram, Member of Parliament and Gopal Singh, CMD, Central Coalfields Limited, on 25 February 2019.

Tetariakhar expansion open cast project (0.5 to 2.0 million tonnes per year normative and 2.5 mty peak) is located in the North Karanpura Coalfield in Latehar district.

== Opposition to expansion of projects ==
According to a Press Trust of India report, human rights group Amnesty International has claimed that "abusive laws and the poor enforcement of safeguards" at coal mines is leading tribal communities to oppose expansion of these blocks. Coal India, accounts for over 80% of the India's coal production and is aiming at producing a billion tonnes annually. The Ministry of Coal opines, "We strongly object to the baseless canards being spread, which are part of a conspiracy to derail the development and progress of India and efforts to provide livelihood for people deprived of fruits of development.” Amnesty International cites, as examples, three mines – Tetariakhar mine of CCL in Jharkhand, Kusmunda mine of SECL in Chhattisgarh and Basundhara West mine of MCL in Odisha.

The report says that in the three mines cited above, land was acquired without directly informing the affected families or consulting them about their rehabilitation and resettlement. Quite often the official notice is published only in the government gazette. Land acquisition for CIL mines is carried out under Coal Bearing Areas (Acquisition and Development) (CBA) Act, which does not require authorities to consult affected communities, or seek prior and informed consent of Indigenous people, as stipulated by international law, it said. A new land acquisition law enacted in 2014 specifically exempts acquisition under the CBA Act from seeking the consent of affected families or carrying out social impact assessments, it added.

See also – When land is lost do we eat coal? - Amnesty International handout
