= Government Engineering College, Palamu =

Technology college in Jharkhand, India

Government Engineering College Palamu
- Other name: GEC Palamu
- Motto: Vidyā Paramaṃ Balam (Sanskrit)
- Motto in English: Knowledge is the ultimate strength
- Type: Public Technical institute
- Established: 2022; 4 years ago
- Accreditation: AICTE
- Affiliations: Jharkhand University of Technology
- Principal: Sanjay Kumar Singh
- Students: 1200+
- Undergraduates: 1200+
- Location: lesliganj, Medininagar, Palamu, Jharkhand, India; 24.0576737°N 84.1747872°E
- Campus: 7.65 acres; Rural
- Language: Hindi and English
- Website: gecpalamu.ac.in

Government Engineering College, Palamu (GEC Palamu) is a state government engineering institution located in lesliganj, Palamu district, Jharkhand, India. The college is owned and comes under the Department of Higher and Technical Education Government of Jharkhand. It offers undergraduate engineering programs and was established to improve access to technical education in the Palamu region.

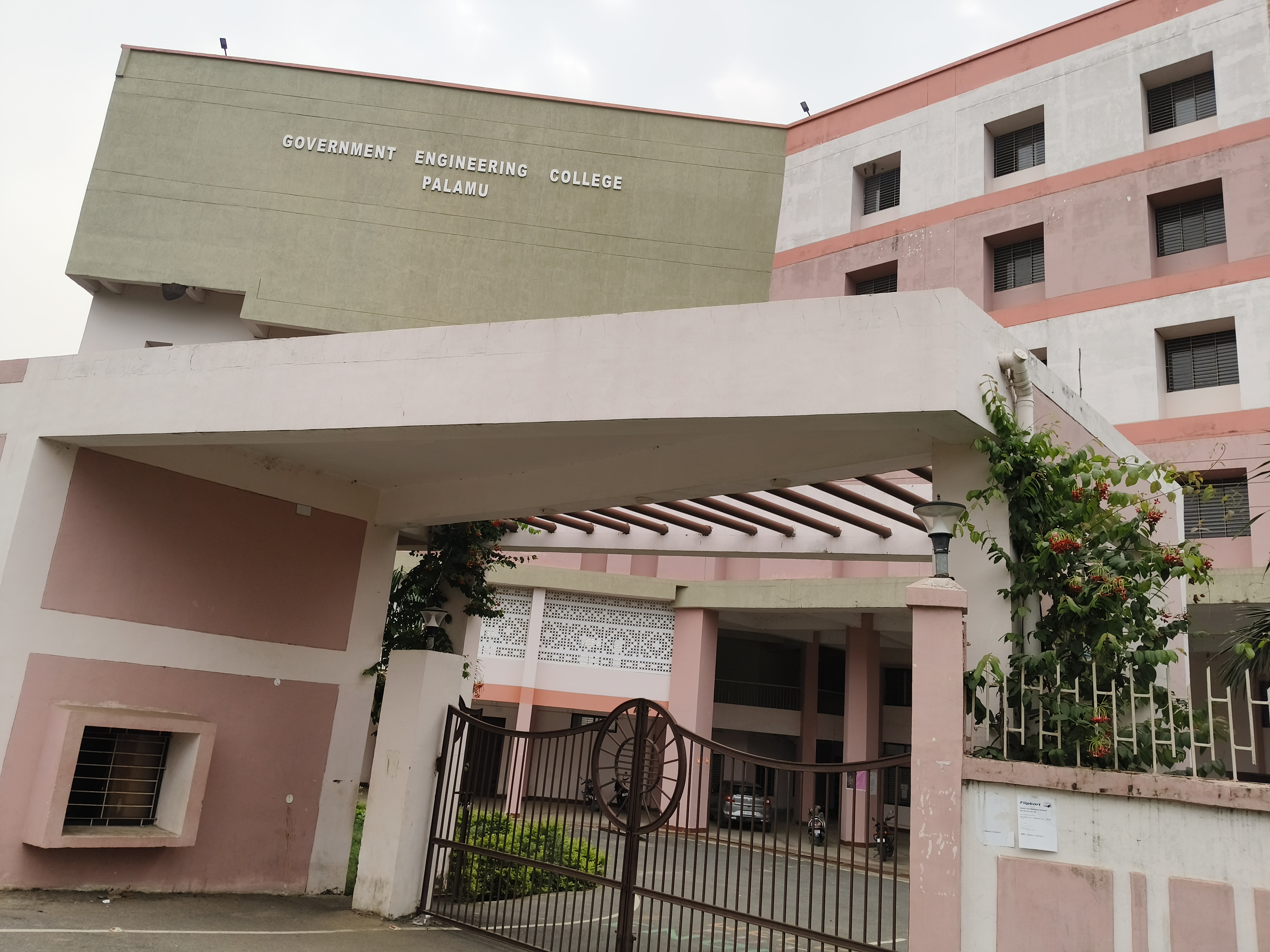
GEC Palamu Main building

Principal Succession Chart
S.No	Name	Tenure
1	Sanjay Kumar Singh	2022 – present

== History ==
Government Engineering College, Palamu was established by the Government of Jharkhand in 2022 as part of the state's initiative to expand public technical education infrastructure.The college was established by the Government of Jharkhand under the Department of Higher and Technical Education. The institution is among the state government–run engineering colleges in Jharkhand. It is one of the state government engineering College of jharkhand.

== Campus ==
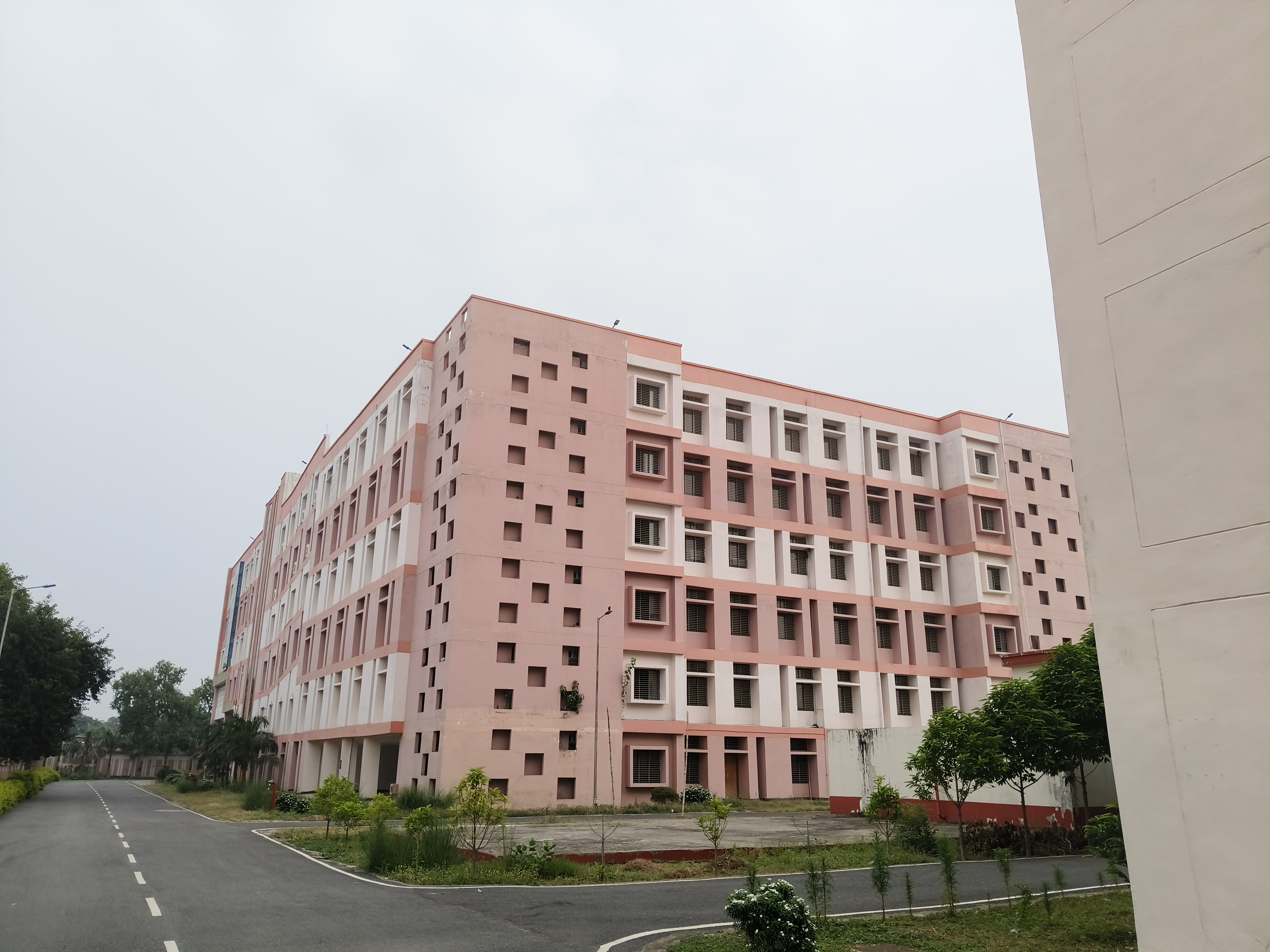
Main Academic building of GEC Palamu

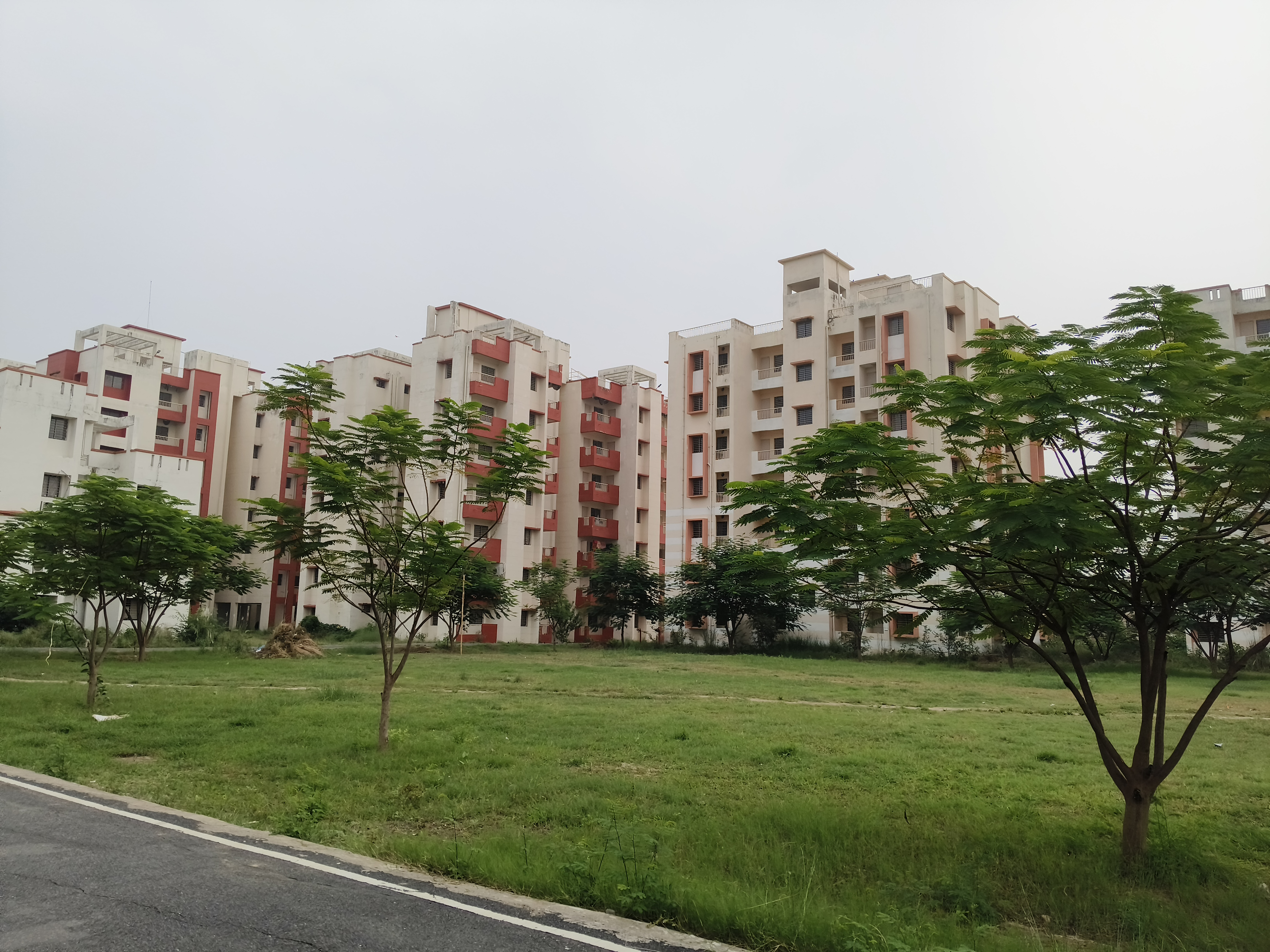
GEC Palamu Playground

The 7.65 acres GEC Palamu campus is located in rural area in Basaura village, roughly 13 kilometres away from the Daltonganj railway station in Palamu district, Jharkhand. The campus comprises academic buildings, laboratories, administrative offices, 3 hostels in which 2 is for boys and 1 is for girls, 2 Faculty Apartments, 2 staff apartments and the campus also provides basic facilities such as a library with a collection of books and digital resources, IT infrastructure, and spaces for extracurricular and sports activities. The infrastructure includes well-maintained Seminar (lecture halls), Classroom, Auditorium and department-specific laboratories designed to support engineering education and the infrastructure development is ongoing as the institution continues to expand.In April 2026, the college expanded its student resources by inaugurating the Udaan Bharat Center, aimed at fostering innovation and entrepreneurship among students. The college promotes a green and eco-friendly environment, offering a conducive atmosphere for academic and technical development.

== Administration ==
The college is owned by Government of Jharkhand and run by the Department of Higher and Technical Education through Directorate of Technical Education.

At the institutional level, GEC Palamu is administrated by the Principal of the college. The Principal is appointed by the Department of Higher and Technical Education Government of Jharkhand. The Principal of the college is the executive head of the Institution.

The Principal is responsible for overall administration of the college and executing the institute's activities and is supported by the respective Head of departments and several Prof.In-Charge of their respective departments.

== Academics ==
The institute offers undergraduate (B.Tech.) programs and follows the academic curriculum of Jharkhand University of Technology.

=== Programmes ===
Government Engineering College, Palamu offers Bachelor of Technology (B.Tech.) programs in the following disciplines:

- Mechanical engineering
- Electrical engineering
- Computer Science and engineering
- Civil engineering

=== Admissions ===
Admission to the B.Tech. programs is based on performance in the JEE Main. Seat allocation and counselling are conducted by the Jharkhand Combined Entrance Competitive Examination Board(JCECEB) in accordance with Jharkhand government reservation policies.

=== Affiliation and accreditation ===
The college is approved by the All India Council for Technical Education(AICTE) and is affiliated by Jharkhand University of Technology(JUT).

=== Rankings ===
University and college rankings

== Departments ==
=== Department Of Science ===
- Physics
- Chemistry
- Biology

== Student life ==
The institute provides hostel accommodation for students. Eligible students can apply for various government scholarship schemes, including the e-Kalyan Scholarship of the Government of Jharkhand.The college organizes various technical and cultural events to promote holistic development. In 2025, the college celebrated World Creativity and Innovation Day, featuring student projects and seminars. Student activities include technical, cultural, and sports.The institute provides library, laboratories, and sports facilities for students. Students participate in technical, cultural, and sports activities, and are encouraged to develop soft skills, leadership qualities, and innovation through various programs.

== Clubs and Societies ==
- IIC (Institutions Innovation Council)
- SIC (Science & Innovation Club)
- Sandhan Club (Research)
- E-Cell (Entrepreneurship Cell)
- Udaan Bharat (NGO/Teaching)
- NSS (National Service Scheme)
- UBA (Unnat Bharat Abhiyan)
- Arts & Cultural Society
- Rang Srijan (Painting/Rangoli)
- Eco Club
- Literary Club
- Code hack Club
- Prahari Club

== Placements and Training ==
Placement activities at Government Engineering College, Palamu are in the developmental stage. The college encourages internships, training programs, and industry interaction. The Training and Placement Cell facilitates campus recruitment, internships, and career guidance. It organizes personality development programs, communication skills training, and career planning sessions. As an institution established in 2022, placement activities are still developing, with gradual growth in industry interaction and recruitment opportunities.

== See also ==
- Department of Higher and Technical Education (Jharkhand)
- List of institutions of higher education in Jharkhand
- Birsa Institute of Technology Sindri
