= Jaynath Pati =

Indian Freedom Fighter and Magahi novelist

Jayanath Pati
- Born: 1890
- Died: 1939 (aged 48–49)
- Occupations: Writer, novelist
- Writing career
- Language: Magahi

Jayanath Pati (1890–1939) was an Indian freedom fighter and novelist who wrote in Magahi. He was a prominent scholar on Indian history and culture. He wrote Sunita the first novel in the Magahi language.

== Biography ==
Jayanath Pati was a versatile scholar, writer, editor-publisher and Vedic scholar. He was a serious scholar of language, culture and history. At the same time, he was active and creative on many fronts as a writer on Vedas, history, and language-culture in various journals. He wrote articles and literature in his mother tongue Magahi, and provided leadership to the freedom movement at the local level. Magahi is spoken in the east of India, in the state of Bihar and Jharkhand. Pati then published books in Magahi and took out handwritten newspapers for the freedom struggle. Not only this, being a mokhtar, he was also fighting legal battles for the rights of mokhtar's from British rule. Jaynath Pati - who became a Mokhtar after studying only up to the 12th standard - also contributed to the field of education, he established the Anglo-Sanskrit School in Nawada which is still running today.

Pati was a fearless nationalist. He was the only member at the local level of the Home Rule movement. He led the Surajis as the President of the Nawada Congress Committee during Mahatma Gandhi's Satyagraha movement in 1920. To organize the freedom movement, he started a handwritten newspaper, which he wrote in his house's basement. He then traveled through villages with his wife Shyama Devi to spread it among the readers. Due to his active role in the freedom struggle, he spent nine months in the Central Jail Hazaribagh in 1930.

== Works ==
Jayanath Pati wrote the first Magahi-language novel Sunita in late 1927 which was published in 1928. This novel was reviewed by the eminent linguist Suniti Kumar Chatterji in April 1928 issue of The Modern Review. The novel no longer available, but the copy of his second Magahi novel Fool Bahadur Phool Bahadur published on 1 April, 1928 has been preserved. After this, his third novel Gadhneet was published. In all three of his novels, he has hit hard on social stereotypes and corruption. Apart from this, Jayanath Pati published a Magahi translation of the Government of India Act 1935 under the title 'Swaraj' in 1937. He also formed an organization for the development of modern Magahi literature and wrote many books, most of which remained unpublished. A book of Magahi folk literature compiled by him was also published.
