= Naudiha Bazar block =

Naudiha Bazar
- Block

- Location in jharkhand, India Naudiha Bazar (India)
- Coordinates: 24.3774°N 84.2985°E
- Country: India
- State: Jharkhand
- District: Palamu
- Block: Naudiha Bazar

Government
  - MLA: Pushpa Devi; Bharatiya Janata Party

Population (2011)
  - Total: 706

Languages
  - Official: Magahi, Hindi
- Time zone: UTC+5:30 (IST)
- PIN: 822113
- Vehicle registration: JH

Naudiha Bazar block is one of the administrative community development block of Palamu district, Jharkhand state, India.

== Demographics ==
Religion in Naudiha Bazar block (2011)
Religion	Percent
Hinduism	93.25%
Islam	6.27%
Other or not stated	0.48%

At the time of the 2011 census, Nawadiha Bazar block had a population of 73,799. Nawadiha Bazar block had a sex ratio of 927 females per 1000 males and a literacy rate of 53.42%: 63.43% for males and 42.48% for females. 13,307 (18.03%) were under 7 years of age. The entire population lived in rural areas. Scheduled Castes and Scheduled Tribes were 25,496 (34.55%) and 7,142 (9.68%) of the population, respectively.

Languages of Naudiha Bazar block (2011)
1. Hindi (52.31%)
2. Magahi (45.40%)
3. Urdu (1.97%)
4. Others (0.32%)

== See also ==
- Palamu Loksabha constituency
- Jharkhand Legislative Assembly
- Jharkhand
- Palamu
