= Department of Higher and Technical Education (Jharkhand) =

Government Department of Jharkhand

- उच्च एवं तकनीकी शिक्षा विभाग

Department overview
- Jurisdiction: Government of Jharkhand
- Headquarters: Yojana Bhawan, Nepal House, Doranda, Ranchi, Jharkhand
- Minister responsible: Vacant, Minister of Higher and Technical Education, Jharkhand
- Department executive: Rahul Kumar Purwar, IAS, Principal Secretary
- Parent department: Government of Jharkhand
- Website: Official website

The Department of Higher and Technical Education is a department under the Government of Jharkhand. It is responsible for the governance, regulation and development of higher and technical education in the state, including policy formulation, coordination with universities and oversight of government and government-aided institutions.

== Ministerial team ==
The ministerial team is headed by the Cabinet Minister for Higher and Technical Education. Civil servants such as the Principal Secretary are appointed to support the minister in managing the department and implementing its functions. Since December 2024, the minister for Department of Higher and Technical Education is Sudivya Kumar.

== Departments ==
- Directorate of Higher Education
- Directorate of Technical Education

=== Autonomous bodies ===
- Jharkhand University of Technology (JUT)

=== Board and Councils ===
- Jharkhand Combined Entrance Competitive Examination Board (JCECEB)
- Jharkhand State Higher Education Council (JSHEC)
- Jharkhand Council on Science, Technology & Innovation (JCSTI)
- Jharkhand State Faculty Development Academy (JSFDA)

== List of Government Technical Institutions ==
=== Engineering ===
- Birsa Institute of Technology Sindri (BIT Sindri)
- Government Engineering College, Palamu (GEC Palamu)
- Government Engineering College Bokaro (GEC Bokaro)
- Government Engineering College Godda (GEC Godda)

== See also ==
- Government of Jharkhand
- List of institutions of higher education in Jharkhand
- Department of Higher Education (India)
- Ministry of Education (India)
- University Grants Commission (India)
