= Medini Rai Medical College and Hospital, Palamu =

Medical College in Jharkhand, India

Coordinates: 24.0417°N 84.1102°E

- Former name: Palamu Medical College
- Motto in English: Sarve Santu Niramaya (सर्वं संतु निरामयाः)
- Type: Medical College and Hospital
- Established: 2019; 7 years ago
- Affiliations: Nilamber-Pitamber University
- Principal: Dr. Jakka Srinivas Rao
- Location: Medininagar, Palamu, Jharkhand, India
- Campus: Urban
- Website: http://mmchpalamu.org/

Medini Rai Medical College and Hospital, Palamu is a full-fledged tertiary referral Government Medical college. It was established in the year 2019. The college offers the degree Bachelor of Medicine and Surgery (MBBS).

== Location ==
Medini Rai Medical College and Hospital is located in Medininagar, Palamu.

== About College ==
The college is affiliated with the Nilamber-Pitamber University and is recognized by the National Medical Commission. The hospital associated with the college is one of the largest hospitals in the Palamu district. The selection to the college is done on the basis of merit through National Eligibility and Entrance Test. Yearly undergraduate student intake is 100 from the year 2019.

== Courses ==
Palamu Medical College undertakes education and training of students MBBS courses.

== See also ==
- Education in India
- Literacy in India
- List of institutions of higher education in Jharkhand
