= Pipra block =

Pipra
- Block

- Location in jharkhand, India
- Coordinates: 24.52°N 84.28°E
- Country: India
- State: Jharkhand
- District: Palamu

Government
  - MLA: Radha Krishna Kishore; Bharatiya Janata Party

Population (2001)
  - Total: 146,139

Languages
  - Official: Magahi, Hindi
- Time zone: UTC+5:30 (IST)
- PIN: 822113
- Website: palamu.nic.in/patan.html

Pipra Block is one of the administrative blocks of Palamu district, Jharkhand state, India.

== Demographics ==
Religion in Pipra block (2011)
Religion	Percent
Hinduism	98.43%
Islam	1.45%
Other or not stated	0.12%

At the time of the 2011 census, Pipra block had a population of 36,389. Pipra block had a sex ratio of 936 females per 1000 males and a literacy rate of 61.30%: 72.50% for males and 49.30% for females. 6,174 (16.97%) were under 7 years of age. The entire population lived in rural areas. Scheduled Castes and Scheduled Tribes were 13,970 (38.39%) and 308 (0.85%) of the population, respectively.

Languages of Pipra block (2011)
1. Magahi (92.3%)
2. Hindi (7.67%)
3. Others (0.05%)

== See also ==
- Palamu Loksabha constituency
- Jharkhand Legislative Assembly
- Jharkhand
- Palamu
