= Phool Bahadur =

1928 Magahi novel by Jainath Pati

Fool Bahadur is a novel in Magahi language by Indian author Jaynath Pati that was published in 1928 and was the first novel written in Magahi Language. It was a Comic novel and was published on first of April on April Fools' Day.
