= Padwa block =

Padwa
- Block

- Location in Jharkhand, India
- Coordinates: 24.173599°N 84.060195°E
- Country: India
- State: Jharkhand
- District: Palamu
- Block: Padwa

Government
  - MLA: Radha Krishna Kishore; Bharatiya Janata Party

Population (2001)
  - Total: 46,957

Languages
  - Official: Magahi, Hindi
- Time zone: UTC+5:30 (IST)
- PIN: 822123

Padwa or Pandwa is one of the administrative community development block of Palamu district, Jharkhand state, India. The Pandwa block has 8,985 households with aggregate population of 46,957. The block has 8 panchayats and about 34 villages.

Pandwa is a part of Chhatarpur (Vidhan Sabha constituency).

== Demographics ==
Religion in Padwa block (2011)
Religion	Percent
Hinduism	94.20%
Islam	5.58%
Other or not stated	0.22%

At the time of the 2011 census, Padwa block had a population of 46,957. Padwa block had a sex ratio of 930 females per 1000 males and a literacy rate of 65.56%: 77.35% for males and 52.84% for females. 7,629 (16.25%) were under 7 years of age. The entire population lived in rural areas. Scheduled Castes and Scheduled Tribes were 13,927 (29.66%) and 1,664 (3.54%) of the population, respectively.

Languages of Padwa block (2011)
1. Hindi (92.3%)
2. Magahi (4.33%)
3. Bhojpuri (2.78%)
4. Others (0.62%)

== See also ==
- Chhatarpur Assembly
- Palamu Loksabha constituency
- Jharkhand Legislative Assembly
- Jharkhand
- Palamu
