= Medininagar block =

Coordinates: 24.05°N 84.08°E

Medininagar block is one of the administrative Gram panchayat of Palamu district, Jharkhand state, India.

== Demographics ==
Religion in Medininagar block (2011)
Religion	Percent
Hinduism	86.81%
Islam	11.08%
Christianity	0.91%
Sarna	0.47%
Other or not stated	0.73%

At the time of the 2011 census, Medininagar block had a population of 201,596. Medininagar block had a sex ratio of 904 females per 1000 males and a literacy rate of 80.10%: 87.52% for males and 71.90% for females. 27,964 (13.87%) were under 7 years of age. 120,325 (59.69%) lived in urban areas. Scheduled Castes and Scheduled Tribes were 30,639 (15.20%) and 22,324 (11.07%) of the population, respectively.

Languages of Medininagar block (2011)
1. Hindi (88.1%)
2. Urdu (8.78%)
3. Kurukh (1.67%)
4. Others (1.41%)
