= Mithilesh Kumar Thakur =

Indian politician

Member of Legislative Assembly Jharkhand
- In office 23 December 2019 – 2024
- Preceded by: Satyendra Nath Tiwari
- Succeeded by: Satyendra Nath Tiwari
- Constituency: Garhwa

Personal details
- Born: 16 February 1966 (age 60) Chatra, Jharkhand, India
- Party: Jharkhand Mukti Morcha
- Spouse: Chanchal Thakur (m.2004)
- Parent: Kaushal Kumar Thakur (Father)
- Occupation: MLA

Mithilesh Kumar Thakur (born 16 February 1966) is an Indian politician from Jharkhand. He won the 2019 Jharkhand Legislative Assembly election representing the Jharkhand Mukti Morcha from Garhwa Assembly constituency. He is formerly served as the Cabinet Minister of Jharkhand.

== Early life and education ==
Thakur is from Chaibasa village, West Singhbum District, Jharkhand. He is the son of late Kaushal Kumar Thakur. He completed his B.A. in History honours in 1993 at St. Columbas College, Hazaribag, which is affiliated with Ranchi University. Earlier, he did his Intermediate in 1983 at Tata College, Chaibasa.

== Career ==
Thakur won from Garhwa Assembly constituency representing Jharkhand Mukti Morcha in the 2019 Jharkhand Legislative Assembly election. He polled 106,681 votes and defeated his nearest rival, Satyendra Nath Tiwari of the Bharatiya Janata Party, by a margin of 23,522 votes. He lost in 2024.
