= Manatu block =

Manatu
- Block

- Location in jharkhand, India
- Coordinates: 24.23°N 84.40°E
- Country: India
- State: Jharkhand
- District: Palamu
- Block: Manatu

Government
  - MLA: Devendra Singh; INC

Population (2001)
  - Total: 46,856

Languages
  - Official: Magahi, Hindi
- Time zone: UTC+5:30 (IST)
- PIN: 822123
- Website: palamu.nic.in/Manatu.html

Manatu block is one of the administrative blocks of Palamu district, Jharkhand state, Inmanatu dia. According to census (2001), the block has 18,083 households with aggregate population of 97,622. The block has 190 villages.

== Demographics ==
Religion in Manatu block (2011)
Religion	Percent
Hinduism	84.88%
Islam	13.90%
Others (Sarna)	0.40%
Other or not stated	0.81%

At the time of the 2011 census, Manatu block had a population of 46,856. Manatu block had a sex ratio of 921 females per 1000 males and a literacy rate of 47.76%: 56.98% for males and 37.71% for females. 8,918 (19.03%) were under 7 years of age. The entire population lived in rural areas. Scheduled Castes and Scheduled Tribes were 14,489 (30.92%) and 9,794 (20.90%) of the population, respectively.

Languages of Manatu block (2011)
1. Hindi (83.9%)
2. Magahi (9.28%)
3. Urdu (3.97%)
4. Kurukh (2.37%)
5. Others (0.52%)

== See also ==
- Palamu Loksabha constituency
- Jharkhand Legislative Assembly
- Jharkhand
- Palamu
