= Mohammadganj block =

Coordinates: 24.427°N 83.870°E

Mohammadganj block is one of the administrative blocks of Palamu district, Jharkhand state, India.

== Demographics ==
Religion in Mohammadganj block (2011)
Religion	Percent
Hinduism	82.56%
Islam	17.26%
Other or not stated	0.18%

At the time of the 2011 census, Mohammadganj block had a population of 47,315. Mohammadganj block had a sex ratio of 921 females per 1000 males and a literacy rate of 66.67%: 77.97% for males and 54.38% for females. 7,713 (16.30%) were under 7 years of age. The entire population lived in rural areas. Scheduled Castes and Scheduled Tribes were 15,452 (32.66%) and 286 (0.60%) of the population, respectively.

Languages of Mohammadganj block (2011)
1. Hindi (77.3%)
2. Urdu (14.0%)
3. Magahi (8.20%)
4. Others (0.42%)
