= Lesliganj =

- Block
- Location in jharkhand, India Lesliganj (India)
- Coordinates: 24.03°N 84.20°E
- Country: India
- State: Jharkhand
- District: Palamu
- Block: Lesliganj

Government
  - Type: Federal democracy

Area
  - Total: 18,523.01 ha (45,771.35 acres)

Population (2001)
  - Total: 79,345
  - Density: 428.36/km^{2} (1,109.4/sq mi)
  - Households: 14,502

Languages
  - Official: Hindi

Population (census 2001)
  - Male: 40370
  - Female: 38975
  - Total Literate (Male): 21743
  - Total Literate (Female): 10641
  - Total Literate: 32384
- Time zone: UTC+5:30 (IST)
- PIN: 822118
- Vehicle registration: JH
- Website: palamu.nic.in/Lesliganj.html

Lesliganj block is one of the administrative blocks of Palamu district, Jharkhand state, India.

== History ==
Lesliganj is an historic place; it was an army camp during British rule in India and hence also called Chawni (means "place where force makes camp"). The place has been named after Matthew Leslie who was the Collector and Magistrate of Ramgarh Hill tract in the 1780s. This is the place where the martyr brothers Nilamber and Pitamber were hanged by the British. Therefore, there is a demand from some sections of people to rename it as Nilamber and Pitamber Nagar.

== Location in Jharkhand ==
Lesliganj is a town in Palamu District in the Indian state of Jharkhand. It is located about 18 km from Daltonganj, the district headquarters and around 210 km from State capital Ranchi. It is a major town and is close to the townships of Satbarwa (16 km south), Kundri (6 km east) and Patan (19 km north).

== Governance and development ==
Although Lesliganj is a very old town and has its own historic importance, it still remains underdeveloped and largely poor due to many unstable governments in the recent history of the state. Like other areas in Jharkhand, Lesliganj still remains undeveloped, partly due to neglect of the government and partly due to the naxal presence in the interior areas.

Few villages are yet to receive electricity connections and those villages which have it, hardly get the supply continuously.

Lesliganj caters to the day-to-day needs of the locals through the temporary bazaar which sits thrice a week i.e. on Sundays, Tuesdays, and Thursdays.

Other places where the bazaars are held are Kundri, Oriya, Bhakasi, Dhangaon and Getha normally bi-weekly or thrice in a week.

== Modes of transport ==
=== Roadways ===
- Lesliganj is linked with various parts of the district by roads. Most villages of the block do not have an all-weather road.
- Jharkhand State Highway 10 which starts from Daltonganj and passes through Lesliganj & Panki in Palamu district and ends in Balumath in Latehar district.
- Lesliganj is also connected by Gaya (Bihar) by local road (Paduma Tarhasi main road) which starts from Jharkhand State Highway 10 at Yugambar Dixit Memorial.

=== Railways ===
Daltonganj railway station is situated in Medininagar is on the Barkakana–Son Nagar line is the nearest railhead, about 17 Km away from Lesliganj.

=== Airways ===
- Gaya Airport is the Nearest airport, 124 km away from Lesliganj.
- Birsa Munda Airport, Ranchi is 166 km away from Lesliganj.

== Education ==
=== Colleges ===
- Government Engineering College, Palamu (GEC Palamu) , open in the year 2022. College is situated in Basaura, Lesliganj, Medninagar Or daltonganj Palamu (Jharkhand), PIN-822118. The Institute is approved by AICTE, New Delhi and Affiliated to Jharkhand University of Technology, Ranchi. It is one of the state government engineering College of jharkhand under the department of Higher and Technical Education Govt. of Jharkhand.

=== Schools ===
- Govt.+2 High School Lesliganj
- Kasturba Gandhi Aawashiya Vidyalaya
- Ramdhari Sahu Project Girls High School Lesliganj
- Govt. Utkramit Middle School, lesliganj
- Ideal Public School (Dhela Road Kurainpatra Lesliganj)
- GLOBAL Era Public School, Lesliganj
- Govt. Utkramit Middle School, (Jhagarpur, lesliganj)
- Govt. Utkramit Primary School (Basaura, Lesliganj)

== Health ==
- CHC Lesliganj
  - PHC Banshdih
  - PHC Gentha
- NIDAN SEVA SADAN Hospital

== Attractions ==
Betla National Park is a nearby attraction not quite in Lesliganj but accessible from Daltonganj.

== Nearby villages ==
Nearby villages are Jamundih (0 km), Kurain Patra (1.614 km), Darudih (1.800 km), Purnadih (3.219 km), Haratua (3.838 km), Sangbar (3.991 km), Juru (5.607 km) Amwa khurd(8.5 km) Phulang(8.2 km) Ramsagar(8.2 km)

Other villages in the Lesliganj block include Murmusi, Chaura, Dabara, Darudih, Haratua, Jamundih, Juru, Kott Khas, Kundari, Kurain Patra, Naudiha, Oriya Kalan, Pahari Khurd, Pahari Kala, Kirto, Nawadih-Bhakasi.

== Post offices ==
Lesliganj has a post office having pin Code 822118. Other post offices in the block are Kundari, Sangbar, Banshikhurd, Pagar Khurd, Rajwadih, Dhangaon etc.

== Banks ==
It has quite a few number of prominent banks making the things easy for the villagers. The banks in and around Lesliganj include :-

- State Bank of India, Lesliganj
- Punjab National Bank, Chainpur
- State Bank of India, Mohammadganj
- Punjab National Bank, Manatu
- State Bank of India, Murubar
- Gramin Bank, Lesliganj

== See also ==
- Palamu Loksabha constituency
- Jharkhand Legislative Assembly
- Jharkhand
- Palamu
