= Anant Pratap Deo =

Indian politician

Member of the Jharkhand Legislative Assembly
- Incumbent
- Assumed office 2024
- Constituency: Bhawanathpur

Personal details
- Party: Indian National Congress; Bharatiya Janata Party Jharkhand Mukti Morcha (2024 - present)
- Parent: Shankar Pratap Deo (father)
- Education: Central Hindu School, kamodhya, Varanasi
- Occupation: Politician

Anant Pratap Deo is an Indian politician and member of the Jharkhand Mukti Morcha. Deo was a member of the Jharkhand Legislative Assembly from the Bhawanathpur constituency in Garhwa district as a Jharkhand Mukti Morcha member.

== Early life ==
He was born to Shankar Pratap Deo in the former royal family. He attended Central Hindu School, kamodhya, Varanasi.

== Career ==
He joined Indian National Congress. He won Bhawanathpur constituency in 2009. In 2014, he joined Bharatiya Janata party.
