= Pipra, Narkatiaganj (census code 216737) =

Pipra
- Village
- Location within Bihar
- Coordinates: 27.108°N 84.464°E
- Country: India
- State: Bihar
- District: West Champaran district

Languages
  - Official: Hindi
- Time zone: UTC+5:30 (IST)
- ISO 3166 code: IN-BR

Pipra is a village in West Champaran district in the Indian state of Bihar.

== Demographics ==
As of the 2011 census of India, Pipra had a population of 2549 in 429 households. Males constitute 52.8% of the population and females 47.1%. Pipra has an average literacy rate of 48.5%, lower than the national average of 74%: male literacy is 60.8%, and female literacy is 39.1%. In Pipra, 20.4% of the population is under 6 years of age.
