= Sudha Chaudhry =

Indian hockey player

Personal information
- Nationality: Indian
- Born: 1 July 1961 (age 64)

Sport
- Sport: Field hockey
Medal record
Women's field hockey
Representing India
Asian Games
Gold medal – first place	1982 Delhi	Team competition

Sudha Chaudhry (born 1 July 1961) is an Indian field hockey player. She competed in the women's tournament at the 1980 Summer Olympics.
