= Panki, Jharkhand =

Town in Palamu district, Jharkhand, India

Coordinates: 24.036°N 84.477°E

Panki is a small town situated in the Palamu district of Jharkhand, India. According to the 2011 census, the town has 1,312 households with an aggregate population of 7,743 (4,056 males and 3,687 females). The town is part of the Panki Block, an administrative block of the Palamu district which has 179 registered villages. The town consists of both Hindu and Muslim communities. Most of them belong to the Other Backward Class.

== Languages ==
The people from the Panki region speak Hindi, English, Bhojpuri, Urdu, and Magahi and write in Devanagri scripts.

== Places of Official Importance ==
=== Panki block ===
Panki block is one of the administrative blocks of Palamu district, Jharkhand, India. According to the 2011 census, the block has 30,725 households with an aggregate population of 1,57,850 (80,749 males and 77,101 females). The block has 179 registered villages.

=== Education ===
- Kamla Education of Ramkrishna Mission, Panki
- Panki Girls High School
- Rajkiye Buniyadi Ms Panki School
- Shishu Vidya Mandir
- Govt. H/S Panki
- Sarswati Sishu Mandir Panki
- Siksha Niketan
- Upgovernment Primary School Darjahi
- Govt Urdu Ps Panki Bazar
- MK Inter College, Panki, Jharkhand
- Kidz School, Panki
- JKDPS, Panki
- Ankesh Singh (NGO) USKU, PANKI

== Economic Interests ==
Most of the people from Panki are involved in business and farming, a trend that is gradually changing. Many students from younger generations are choosing full-time jobs instead.
