= Sanjay Kumar Singh Yadav =

Indian politician

Member of the Jharkhand Legislative Assembly

Sanjay Kumar Singh Yadav (born 1968) is an Indian politician from Jharkhand. He is a three-time MLA from Hussainabad Assembly constituency in Palamu District. He won the 2024 Jharkhand Legislative Assembly election, representing the Rashtriya Janata Dal.

== Early life and education ==
Yadav is from Hussainabad, Palamu District, Jharkhand. He is the son of Krishna Chandra Prasad. He passed Class 10 at Harvey High School, Japla, Bihar.

== Career ==
Yadav won from Hussainabad Assembly constituency representing Rashtriya Janata Dal in the 2024 Jharkhand Legislative Assembly election. He polled 81,476 votes and defeated his nearest rival, Kamlesh Kumar Singh of the Bharatiya Janata Party, by a margin of 34,364 votes. He first became an MLA winning the 2000 Bihar Legislative Assembly election but lost the next election in 2005 to Kamlesh Kumar Singh of NCP. He regained the seat for RJD winning the 2009 Jharkhand Legislative Assembly election. He won for the third time in the 2024 Assembly election, also on RJD seat.
