= Kamlesh Kumar Singh =

Indian politician

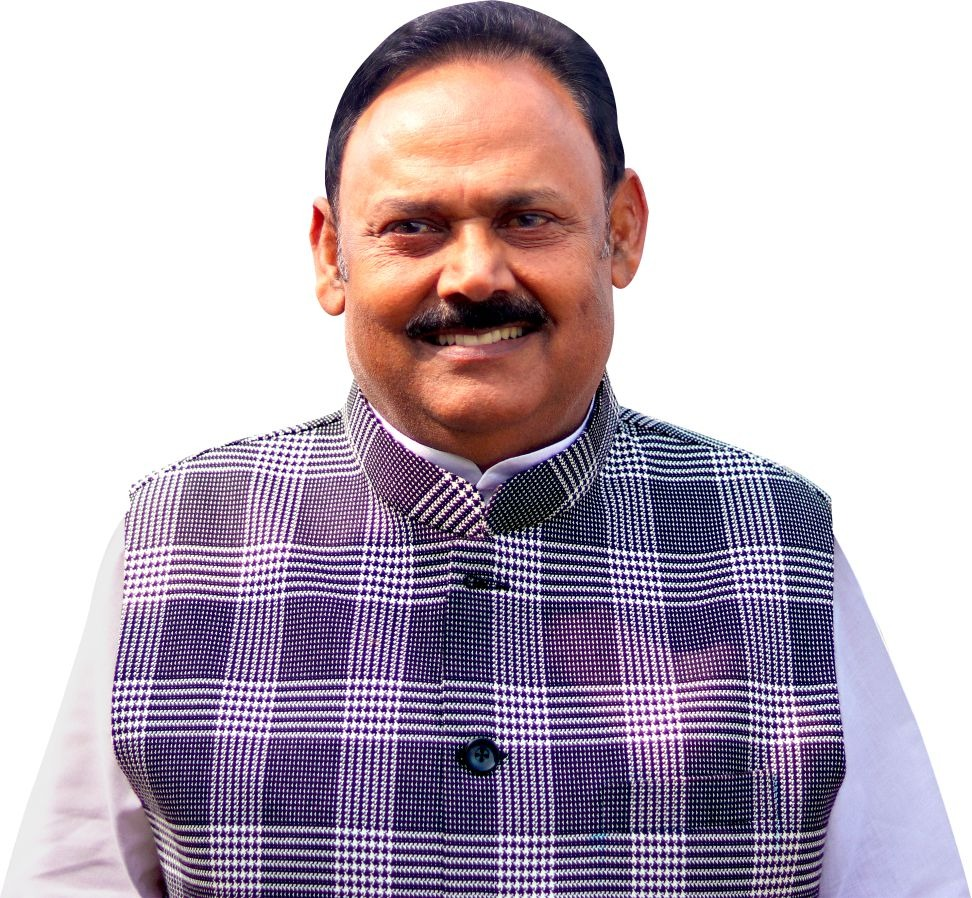

Member of Legislative Assembly, Jharkhand
- In office 23 December 2019 – 25 November 2024
- Preceded by: Kushwaha Shivpujan Mehta
- Succeeded by: Sanjay Kumar Singh Yadav
- Constituency: Hussainabad
- In office 27 February 2005 – 23 December 2009
- Preceded by: Sanjay Kumar Singh Yadav
- Succeeded by: Sanjay Kumar Singh Yadav
- Constituency: Hussainabad

Personal details
- Party: Bharatiya Janata Party (2024-present)
- Other political affiliations: Nationalist Congress Party (2005 - 2024)
- Occupation: politician

Kamlesh Kumar Singh is an Indian politician and an MLA elected from Hussainabad (Vidhan Sabha constituency) of Jharkhand state as a member of Nationalist Congress Party 2019. He joined the BJP in 2024.
