= Pipra, Narkatiaganj (census code 216588) =

Pipra
- Village
- Location within Bihar
- Coordinates: 27.108°N 84.464°E
- Country: India
- State: Bihar
- District: West Champaran district

Languages
  - Official: Hindi
- Time zone: UTC+5:30 (IST)
- ISO 3166 code: IN-BR

Pipra is a village in West Champaran district in the Indian state of Bihar.

== Demographics ==
As of the 2011 census of India, Pipra had a population of 1466 in 253 households. Males constitute 53.3% of the population and females 46.6%. Pipra has an average literacy rate of 37.3%, lower than the national average of 74%: male literacy is 66.4%, and female literacy is 33.5%. In Pipra, 25.3% of the population is under 6 years of age.
