= Pushpa Devi =

Indian politician

MLA, Jharkhand Vidhan Sabha
- In office 2019–2024
- Preceded by: Radha Krishna Kishore
- Succeeded by: Radha Krishna Kishore
- Constituency: Chhatarpur

Personal details
- Party: Bharatiya Janata Party
- Spouse: Manoj Kumar
- Children: 3 sons and 2 daughters
- Occupation: MLA

Pushpa Devi is an Indian politician and an MLA elected from Chatarpur block of Jharkhand state as a member of Bharatiya Janata Party 2019.
