= Hussainabad Assembly constituency =

Constituency of the Jharkhand legislative assembly in India

Coordinates: 24.535°N 83.993°E

Hussainabad
- Constituency No. 79 for the Jharkhand Legislative Assembly

Constituency details
- Country: India
- Region: East India
- State: Jharkhand
- District: Palamu
- Lok Sabha constituency: Palamu
- Established: 2000
- Total electors: 278,361
- Reservation: None

Member of Legislative Assembly
- 6th Jharkhand Legislative Assembly
- Incumbent Sanjay Kumar Singh Yadav
- Party: RJD
- Alliance: MGB
- Elected year: 2024

Hussainabad Assembly constituency is an assembly constituency in the Indian state of Jharkhand.

== Members of Legislative Assembly ==
Year	Name	Party
Bihar Legislative Assembly
Before 1957: see Hussainabad cum Garhwa constituency
1957-62: Constituency did not exist
1962	Ramdeni Ram	Indian National Congress
1967	Bhishma Narayan Singh	Indian National Congress
1969	Bhishma Narayan Singh	Indian National Congress
1972	Awadhesh Kumar Singh	Independent politician
1977	Harihar Singh	Indian National Congress
1980	Harihar Singh	Indian National Congress
1985	Harihar Singh	Indian National Congress
1990	Dashrath Kumar Singh	Bharatiya Janata Party
1995	Awadhesh Kumar Singh	Janata Dal
2000	Sanjay Kumar Singh Yadav	Rashtriya Janata Dal
Jharkhand Legislative Assembly
2005	Kamlesh Kumar Singh	Nationalist Congress Party
2009	Sanjay Kumar Singh Yadav	Rashtriya Janata Dal
2014	Kushwaha Shivpujan Mehta	Bahujan Samaj Party
2019	Kamlesh Kumar Singh	Nationalist Congress Party
2024	Sanjay Kumar Singh Yadav	Rashtriya Janata Dal

== Election results ==
=== Assembly election 2024 ===
2024 Jharkhand Legislative Assembly election: Hussainabad
Party	Candidate	Votes	%	±%
RJD	Sanjay Kumar Singh Yadav	81,476	41.98	▲22.79
BJP	Kamlesh Kumar Singh	47,112	24.27	New
BSP	Kushwaha Shivpujan Mehta	24,523	12.64	▼4.99
Independent	Vinod Kumar Singh	18,077	9.31	New
Independent	Col. Sanjay Kumar Singh	5,339	2.75	New
Independent	Manoj Mehta	2,784	1.43	New
Independent	Rajendra Yadav	2,165	1.12	New
NOTA	None of the Above	1,688	0.87	▲0.12
Margin of victory		34,364	17.71	▲11.70
Turnout		1,94,079	60.06	▲1.19
Registered electors		3,23,139		▲16.09
RJD gain from NCP		Swing	▲16.78	

=== Assembly election 2019 ===
2019 Jharkhand Legislative Assembly election: Hussainabad
Party	Candidate	Votes	%	±%
NCP	Kamlesh Kumar Singh	41,293	25.20	▲6.13
RJD	Sanjay Kumar Singh Yadav	31,444	19.19	▲4.40
BSP	Sher Ali	28,877	17.62	▼19.37
Independent	Vinod Kumar Singh	27,860	17.00	New
AJSU	Kushwaha Shivpujan Mehta	15,544	9.49	New
Independent	Rajnish Kumar Rajak	1,990	1.21	New
Independent	Jitendra Kumar	1,977	1.21	New
NOTA	None of the Above	1,234	0.75	▼0.81
Margin of victory		9,849	6.01	▼11.91
Turnout		1,63,876	58.87	▼3.43
Registered electors		2,78,361		▲12.02
NCP gain from BSP		Swing	▼11.80	

=== Assembly election 2014 ===
2014 Jharkhand Legislative Assembly election: Hussainabad
Party	Candidate	Votes	%	±%
BSP	Kushwaha Shivpujan Mehta	57,275	36.99	▲16.59
NCP	Kamlesh Kumar Singh	29,523	19.07	▲6.27
BJP	Kameshwar Prasad Kushwaha	25,430	16.42	New
RJD	Sanjay Kumar Singh Yadav	22,890	14.78	▼8.75
JMM	Dashrath Kumar Singh	7,606	4.91	▼0.25
JVM(P)	Ravindra Kumar Singh	2,094	1.35	New
Independent	Banshidhar Tiwari	1,496	0.97	New
NOTA	None of the Above	2,417	1.56	New
Margin of victory		27,752	17.92	▲14.79
Turnout		1,54,827	62.31	▲8.99
Registered electors		2,48,498		▲16.65
BSP gain from RJD		Swing	▲13.45	

=== Assembly election 2009 ===
2009 Jharkhand Legislative Assembly election: Hussainabad
Party	Candidate	Votes	%	±%
RJD	Sanjay Kumar Singh Yadav	26,735	23.54	▲10.21
BSP	Kushwaha Shivpujan Mehta	23,172	20.40	▲9.72
JD(U)	Dashrath Kumar Singh	22,163	19.51	▲6.70
NCP	Kamlesh Kumar Singh	14,540	12.80	▼0.55
Independent	Jyotiresver Singh	6,109	5.38	New
JMM	Upendra Singh	5,869	5.17	▲3.87
Independent	Mahendra Yadav	2,595	2.28	New
Margin of victory		3,563	3.14	▲3.12
Turnout		1,13,580	53.32	▼5.63
Registered electors		2,13,029		▼22.60
RJD gain from NCP		Swing	▲10.19	

=== Assembly election 2005 ===
2005 Jharkhand Legislative Assembly election: Hussainabad
Party	Candidate	Votes	%	±%
NCP	Kamlesh Kumar Singh	21,661	13.35	New
RJD	Sanjay Kumar Singh Yadav	21,626	13.33	▼18.77
JD(U)	Dashrath Kumar Singh	20,793	12.82	New
BSP	Kushwaha Shivpujan Mehta	17,325	10.68	▲7.41
LJP	Usha Devi	9,379	5.78	New
INC	Jyotirishwar Singh	8,338	5.14	▼7.11
JMM	Raghunandan Prasad	2,112	1.30	New
Margin of victory		35	0.02	▼6.81
Turnout		1,62,246	58.95	▲5.58
Registered electors		2,75,221		▲67.98
NCP gain from RJD		Swing	▼18.75	

=== Assembly election 2000 ===
2000 Bihar Legislative Assembly election: Hussainabad
Party	Candidate	Votes	%	±%
RJD	Sanjay Kumar Singh Yadav	28,074	32.10	New
SAP	Dashrath Kumar Singh	22,102	25.27	New
INC	Irfan Siddiqi	10,715	12.25	New
BJP	Awdhesh Kumar Singh	8,359	9.56	New
Independent	Usha Devi	4,548	5.20	New
Independent	Rajendra Kumar Singh	4,348	4.97	New
BSP	Ram Briksh Ram	2,854	3.26	New
Margin of victory		5,972	6.83	
Turnout		87,450	54.54	
Registered electors		1,63,844		
RJD win (new seat)				

== See also ==
- Palamu district
- List of constituencies of the Jharkhand Legislative Assembly
