= Nilamber-Pitamber University =

State university in Medininagar, Jharkhand

Coordinates: 24.042°N 84.091°E

- Type: Public
- Established: 2009 (17 years ago)
- Affiliations: UGC
- Chancellor: Governor of Jharkhand
- Vice-Chancellor: Dr. Dinesh Kumar Singh
- Location: Medininagar, Jharkhand, India
- Campus: Urban
- Website: www.npu.ac.in

Nilamber-Pitamber University (NPU) is a state university located in Medininagar, Jharkhand, India.

== Colleges ==
=== Constituent colleges ===
- G.L.A. College, Medininagar
- J. S. College, Medininagar
- Y.S.N.M. College, Medininagar
- S.S.J.S.N. College, Garhwa
- Degree College, Manika, Latehar
- Model Degree College, Garhwa

=== Permanent Affiliated Colleges ===
- Banwari Sahu College, Latehar
- A.K. Singh College, Japla
- S.P.D. College, Garhwa
- B.S.M. College, Bhawanathpur
- Majdur Kisan College, Panki
- Gopinath Singh Mahila College, Garhwa

=== Affiliated Colleges ===
- Sukhdeo Sahay Madheshwar Sahay Degree College, Tarhassi
- Gulab Chand Prasad Agrawal Degree College, Sadma, Chhattarpur
- Sankar Pratap Dev Degree College, Nagar Untanri, Garhwa
- Sant Tulsi Dash College, Rehla, Palamu
- Vananchal College of Science, Garhwa
- St. Xavier College, Mahuadand, Jharkhand
- Maa Nagina Shahi Mahila Mahavidyalaya, Nagaruntari
- Haji Naeemul Haque Degree College Dhurki, Garhwa
- Shonebhadra Adarsh Degree College, Kandi

=== Medical College ===
- Medini Rai Medical College and Hospital, Palamu

=== Dental College ===
- Vananchal Dental College & Hospital, Garhwa

=== B.ED. Colleges ===
- G.L.A. College B.Ed. Course, Medininagar
- Indra Singh B.Ed. College, Garhwa
- Kumaresh International B.Ed. College, Rajwadih, Palamu
- Jyoti Prakash Mahila B.Ed. College, Chiyanki, Palamu
- Elite Public B.Ed. College, Medininagar, Palamu
- S.B. Pandey Sanathan Teachers Training College
- R.K. Vyawasaik Sikshan Sansthan, Sonpurwa, Garhwa
- Sidhnath B.Ed. College
- Pt. Jagnarayan Tripathi B.Ed. College
- Gopinath Singh B.Ed. College, Latdag, Meral
- K.P.N.S. B.Ed. College, Chainpur

=== Law College ===
- Bhishma Narain Singh Law College, Medininagar, Palamu

=== Nursing Colleges ===
- Vananchal College of Nursing, Farathia, Garhwa
- Arogyam Hospital & College of Nursing, Garhwa
- Aviram G.V.S.S. College of Nursing, Chandwa
