= Chhatarpur, Jharkhand Assembly constituency =

Assembly constituency in Jharkhand, India

Coordinates: 24.37°N 84.19°E

Chhatarpur
- Constituency No. 78 for the Jharkhand Legislative Assembly

Constituency details
- Country: India
- Region: East India
- State: Jharkhand
- District: Palamu
- Lok Sabha constituency: Palamu
- Established: 2000
- Reservation: SC

Member of Legislative Assembly
- 5th Jharkhand Legislative Assembly
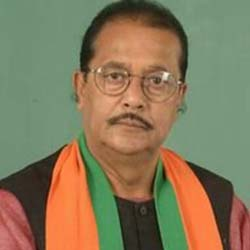
- Incumbent Radha Krishna Kishore
- Party: Indian National Congress
- Elected year: 2024

Chhatarpur is a Legislative Assembly constituency in the Indian state of Jharkhand.

It is located in Palamu district and is reserved for candidates of the Scheduled Castes.

== Members of the Legislative Assembly ==
Year	Name	Party
Bihar Legislative Assembly
Before 1957: see Lesliganj cum Chhatarpur constituency
1957-67: Constituency did not exist
1967	Kumbha Narayan Sardar	Sanghata Socialist Party
1969	Kumbha Narayan Sardar	Sanghata Socialist Party
1972	Kumbha Narayan Sardar	Indian National Congress
1977	Jorawar Ram	Janata Party
1980	Radha Krishna Kishore	Indian National Congress
1985	Radha Krishna Kishore	Indian National Congress
1990	Laxman Ram	Janata Dal
1995	Radha Krishna Kishore	Indian National Congress
2000	Manoj Kumar	Rashtriya Janata Dal
Jharkhand Legislative Assembly
2005	Radha Krishna Kishore	Janata Dal (United)
2009	Sudha Choudhary	Janata Dal (United)
2014	Radha Krishna Kishore	Bharatiya Janata Party
2019	Pushpa Devi	Bharatiya Janata Party
2024	Radha Krishna Kishore	Indian National Congress

== Election results ==
=== Assembly election 2024 ===
2024 Jharkhand Legislative Assembly election: Chhatarpur
Party	Candidate	Votes	%	±%
INC	Radha Krishna Kishore	71,857	36.52%	New
BJP	Pushpa Devi	71,121	36.15%	▼3.24
RJD	Vijay Kumar	20,963	10.65%	▼12.28
Independent	Sandeep Kumar	6,159	3.13%	New
Independent	Laxmi Ravi	4,649	2.36%	New
SP	Mamta Bhuiyan	4,594	2.34%	New
BSP	Chanchala Devi	4,058	2.06%	▼1.56
NOTA	None of the Above	3,026	1.54%	▼0.15
Margin of victory		736	0.37%	▼16.08
Turnout		1,96,745	61.52%	▼0.16
Registered electors		3,19,783		▲21.17
INC gain from BJP		Swing	▼2.87	

=== Assembly election 2019 ===
2019 Jharkhand Legislative Assembly election: Chhatarpur
Party	Candidate	Votes	%	±%
BJP	Pushpa Devi	64,127	39.39%	▲8.79
RJD	Vijay Kumar	37,335	22.93%	▼3.57
AJSU	Radha Krishna Kishore	16,018	9.84%	New
JVM(P)	Dharmendra Prakash Badal	15,522	9.53%	▼3.02
JD(U)	Sudha Chaudhry	8,794	5.40%	▼1.65
BSP	Birendra Kumar Paswan	5,899	3.62%	▲1.69
LJP	Shashikant Kumar	2,923	1.80%	New
NOTA	None of the Above	2,754	1.69%	▼1.73
Margin of victory		26,792	16.46%	▲12.36
Turnout		1,62,802	61.69%	▲2.06
Registered electors		2,63,916		▲9.93
BJP hold		Swing	▲8.79	

=== Assembly election 2014 ===
2014 Jharkhand Legislative Assembly election: Chhatarpur
Party	Candidate	Votes	%	±%
BJP	Radha Krishna Kishore	43,805	30.60%	New
RJD	Manoj Kumar	37,943	26.50%	New
JVM(P)	Prabhat Kumar	17,974	12.55%	New
Independent	Ram Janam Kumar	17,438	12.18%	New
JD(U)	Sudha Chaudhry	10,096	7.05%	▼21.18
BSP	Renu Devi	2,768	1.93%	▼6.49
Independent	Murari Bhuiya	2,493	1.74%	New
NOTA	None of the Above	4,903	3.42%	New
Margin of victory		5,862	4.09%	▼6.55
Turnout		1,43,166	59.63%	▲18.69
Registered electors		2,40,087		▲7.33
BJP gain from JD(U)		Swing	▲2.37	

=== Assembly election 2009 ===
2009 Jharkhand Legislative Assembly election: Chhatarpur
Party	Candidate	Votes	%	±%
JD(U)	Sudha Chaudhry	25,854	28.23%	▼3.10
JMM	Manoj Kumar	16,108	17.59%	▲15.65
INC	Radha Krishna Kishore	15,575	17.01%	▲13.44
LJP	Om Prakash Ram	8,093	8.84%	▲7.55
BSP	Rampati Ranjan	7,712	8.42%	▲2.82
NJSM	Jitendra Kumar	3,246	3.54%	New
Independent	Suresh Mochi	3,065	3.35%	New
Margin of victory		9,746	10.64%	▼2.34
Turnout		91,585	40.94%	▼21.51
Registered electors		2,23,682		▲10.33
JD(U) hold		Swing	▼3.10	

=== Assembly election 2005 ===
2005 Jharkhand Legislative Assembly election: Chhatarpur
Party	Candidate	Votes	%	±%
JD(U)	Radha Krishna Kishore	39,667	31.33%	▲9.86
RJD	Pushpa Devi	23,234	18.35%	▼12.12
Independent	Sudha Chaudhry	10,399	8.21%	New
BSP	Shatrughan Kumar Shatru	9,080	5.60%	▼1.96
INC	Vijay Kumar	5,790	3.57%	▼16.93
JMM	Ravindra Ram	3,138	1.93%	▼2.24
LJP	Lakshman Ram	2,091	1.29%	New
Margin of victory		16,433	12.98%	▲3.98
Turnout		1,26,613	62.45%	▲17.61
Registered electors		2,02,742		▲32.76
JD(U) gain from RJD		Swing	▲0.86	

=== Assembly election 2000 ===
2000 Bihar Legislative Assembly election: Chhatarpur
Party	Candidate	Votes	%	±%
RJD	Manoj Kumar	20,864	30.47%	New
JD(U)	Sumitra Paswan	14,699	21.47%	New
INC	Radha Krishna Kishore	14,038	20.50%	New
BSP	Shatrughan Kumar Shatru	5,171	7.55%	New
JMM	Ganesh Ram	2,855	4.17%	New
CPI	Jagadish Ran	2,746	4.01%	New
BJP	Jawahar Paswan	1,676	2.45%	New
Margin of victory		6,165	9.00%	
Turnout		68,475	46.33%	
Registered electors		1,52,709		
RJD win (new seat)				

== See also ==
- List of constituencies of the Jharkhand Legislative Assembly
- Palamu district
