= Palamu district =

Coordinates: 24°01′48″N 84°04′12″E

- District of Jharkhand
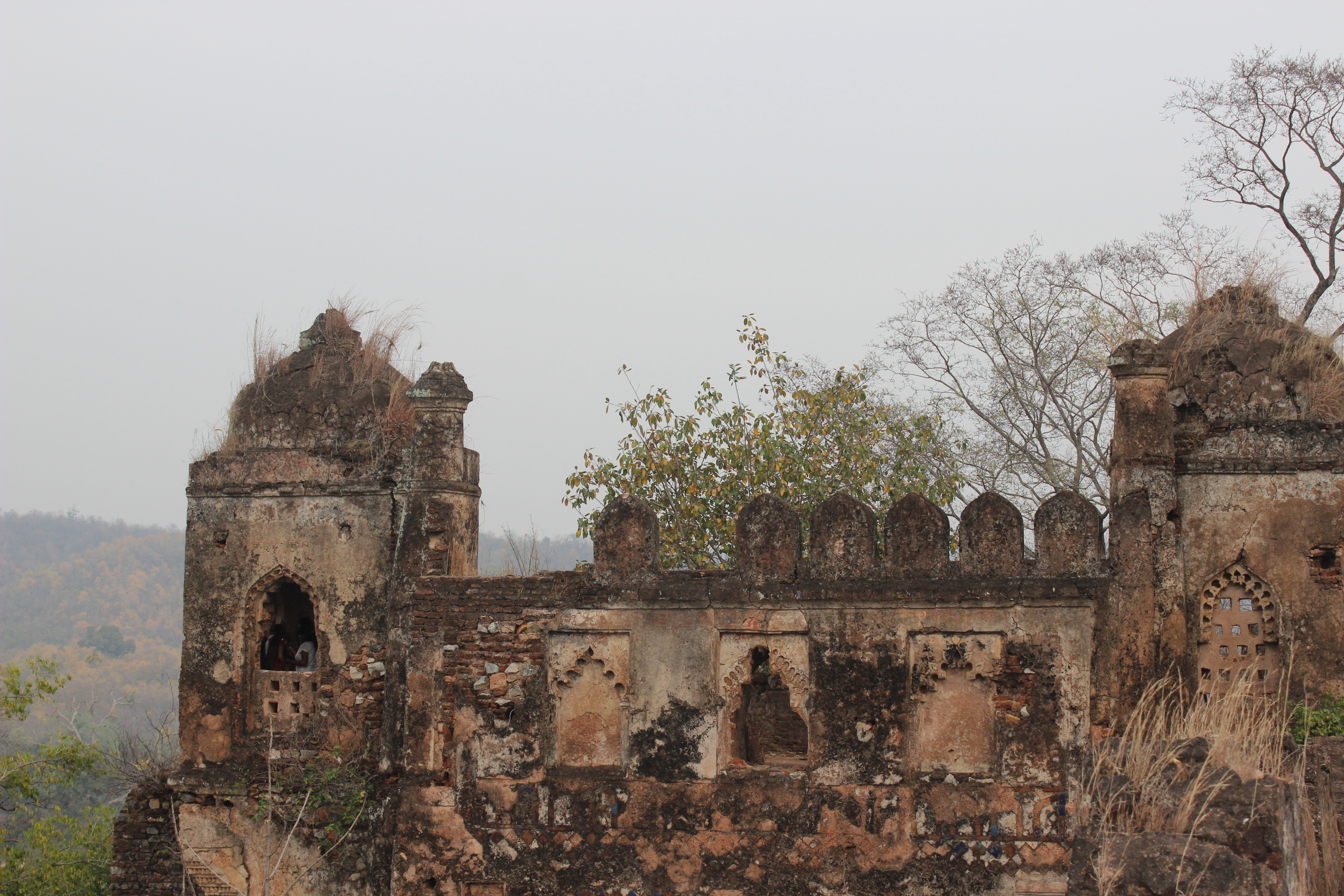
- Palamu fort
- Interactive map of Palamu district
- Country: India
- State: Jharkhand
- Division: Palamu
- Headquarters: Medininagar

Government
  - Deputy Commissioner: Shri Dilip Pratap Singh Sekhawat (IAS)
  - Superintendent of police: Shri Kapil Choudhary (IPS)
  - Lok Sabha constituencies: 1. Palamu, 2. Chatra (shared with Chatra district)
  - Vidhan Sabha constituencies: 5

Area
  - Total: 5,074 km^{2} (1,959 sq mi)

Population
  - Total: 1,939,869
  - Density: 382.3/km^{2} (990.2/sq mi)

Languages
  - Official: Hindi
  - Regional: Nagpuri, Magahi

Demographics
  - Literacy: 63.63%
  - Sex ratio: 928
- Time zone: UTC+05:30 (IST)
- Vehicle registration: JH-03
- Major highways: NH 39, NH 139
- Railway Station: Daltonganj station
- Website: palamu.nic.in

Palamu district is one of the twenty-four districts of Jharkhand, India. It was formed in 1892. The administrative headquarters of the district is Medininagar, situated on the Koel River. Palamu district lies in north-western part of Jharkhand. It shares border with Chatra, Garhwa & Latehar Districts of Jharkhand state.

== History ==
The Palamu district has sites of Neolithic and Chalcolithic settlement in the confluence of the Son and North Koel rivers in Kabra-Kala mound.

During the 12th century, Khayaravala dynasty ruled the japila territory. In the early 16th century, the Chero dynasty in southern Bihar. Sher Shah Suri sent one of his generals, Khawas Khan, to destroy the Chero chief Maharta Chero.

In the late 16th century, the Raksel Rajputs controlled Palamu. The Mughal commander Man Singh had invaded Palamu, but in 1605 after Akbar died the Mughals were driven out. The Chero ruler Sahabal Rai had become a prisoner in Delhi due to his constant raiding of Bihar. His son, Bhagwat Rai, continued the same policy, but was soon attacked by Mughal forces and fled to Dev Sahi, a Surwar Rajput holding the fort of Dhaudanr (near Sasaram). With Puran Mal, Dev Sahi's son, he took service with the Raja of Palamu Man Singh. When Man Singh had gone to Surguja in 1613, Rai killed the Raja's family and took his throne. Under Bhagwat Rai's grandson Medini Rai, the Chero kingdom expanded to the height of its territory: covering large parts of what is now southern Bihar, as well as Hazaribagh. Medini Rai was able to launch expeditions against the Maharaja of Chota Nagpur and built the Fort of Palamu.

In 1629, the Mughal subedar of Patna Ahmad Khan forced the Cheros to pay an annual tribute to the Mughals. In 1641, Chero ruler Pratap Rai refused to pay tribute to then-emperor Shah Jahan. Shaista Khan was sent to destroy the Chero kings with an expedition of 15,000 infantry and 5,000 cavalry, which penetrated as far as Ara and laid siege to the Palamu Fort. During the siege, in 1642, the Cheros attacked a Mughal party, but was soon itself defeated, forcing Pratap Rai to give a sum of Rs. 80,000. Pratap Rai was then betrayed by two of his uncles, Tej Rai and Darya Rai, who convinced Itikad Khan, Shaista Khan's successor, to support their coup if Pratap Rai was sent to Patna. The coup was successful, but Tej Rai still held Pratap Rai, so Darya Rai promised to give the fort of Deogan if Itikad Khan supported him with an army. Itikad Khan's army took over Deogan in October 1643 and defeated Tej Rai's force, allowing Pratap Rai to retake Palamu Fort. However as the Mughal army arrived, Pratap Rai surrendered and went to Patna. He agreed to pay Rs. 1 lakh in annual tribute and was made commander of 1000 horse and given Palamu as jagir.

For the next twenty years however, the Cheros neglected to pay their tribute and continued to make raids into Mughal territory in Bihar. At the time Palamu was described as a well-populated city protected by two strong forts. In 1660, however, Subedar of Bihar Daud Khan had enough and invaded Chero territory. Khan first conquered Kotna, which the Cheros had abandoned, proceeded to Palamu Fort which took months due to the thick jungle. After a long struggle, Khan conquered the fort of Palamu and forced the Chero king to flee. The Cheros briefly regained the fort of Deogan, but soon lost it due to conflict with Namudag estate(Surwar rajputs Gaur royal family )and Palamu was placed under a Muslim faujdar. In 1666 it fell under the direct control of the Subedar of Bihar, and became a fief. The Cheros still held the southern part of the district, but the northern part was given to various nobles. The Raja of Sonpura was the most important of these families, but had fallen out of favour with the Mughal court and lost his lands to Ghulam Hussain Khan after a protracted struggle. Khan controlled much of the northwest of present-day Jharkhand, even as far as the Chota Nagpur kingdom.

In 1720, Palamu was invaded again due to refusal to pay tribute, although the expedition leader was bought off with a large sum of gold and diamonds, and the Mughals invaded again in 1740. At this time the Raja of Ramgarh was the most powerful hill chieftain, and making alliance with several other rulers he took over the fortress of Ramgarh. The Raja offered no resistance to the Maratha general Raghoji I Bhonsle, who passed through the district on his way to raid Medinipur in Bengal.

Due to dynastic struggles, a Chero pretender had made claim to a British agent in Patna to be the rightful ruler of Chero domains in Palamu. The British took the opportunity to take over Palamu Fort. In 1800, one of the Chero rajas enacted a policy against tenants, who rebelled in the Chero insurrection. This rebellion was put down by British troops, who annexed the district into their own territory.

== Geography ==
The district lies between 23°50′ and 24°8′ north latitude and between 83°55′ and 84°30′ east longitude. It is bordered on the north by Son River & Bihar and on the east by the Chatra district on the south by Latehar district and on the west by Garhwa district.

The major rivers flowing through Palamu district are Son, Koel and Auranga. The major crops grown are Rice and Sugarcane. Many minerals are found here like Iron ore, Bauxite, Lithium, Dolomite and Coal.

=== National protected area ===
- Betla National Park is a national park located on the Chota Nagpur Plateau in the Palamu and Latehar district of Jharkhand, India.

== Politics ==
District	No.	Constituency	Name	Party	Alliance		Remarks	Palamu	75	Panki	Shashi Bhushan Mehta
76	Daltonganj	Alok Chaurasiya						Palamu			
77	Bishrampur	Naresh Prasad Singh		RJD	MGB			Palamu			
78	Chhatarpur	Radha Krishna Kishore		INC	MGB	Cabinet minister		Palamu			
79	Hussainabad	Sanjay Kumar Yadav		RJD	MGB			Palamu			

== Administration ==
Palamu district is headed by Deputy Commissioner (DC) who is an (IAS) officer. Palamu district consists of 3 Sub-divisions and 21 Blocks. The following are the list of the Blocks in Palamau district:

Subdivision	Blocks
Sadar Medininagar	Medininagar; Chainpur; Patan; Bishrampur; Panki; Manatu; Satbarwa; Nilambar-Pitambarpur; Tarhasi; Padwa; Pandu; Untari Road; Nawa Bazar; Ramgarh
Chhatarpur	Chatarpur; Hariharganj; Naudiha Bazar; Pipra
Hussainabad	Hussainabad; Mohammadganj; Haidernagar

== Economy ==
In 2006 the Ministry of Panchayati Raj named Palamau one of the country's 250 most backward districts (out of a total of 640). It is one of the 24 districts in Jharkhand currently receiving funds from the Backward Regions Grant Fund Programme (BRGF).

== Demographics ==
Historical population
Year	Pop.	±% p.a.
1901	308,256	—
1911	341,869	+1.04%
1921	364,579	+0.65%
1931	407,004	+1.11%
1941	453,731	+1.09%
1951	490,037	+0.77%
1961	589,337	+1.86%
1971	738,316	+2.28%
1981	950,839	+2.56%
1991	1,192,801	+2.29%
2001	1,537,465	+2.57%
2011	1,939,869	+2.35%

According to the 2011 census Palamu district has a population of 1,939,869, giving it a ranking of 243rd in India (out of a total of 640). The district has a population density of 442 inhabitants per square kilometre (1,140/sq mi). Its population growth rate over the decade 2001-2011 was 25.94%. Palamu has a sex ratio of 929 females for every 1000 males, and a literacy rate of 63.63%. 11.65% of the population lives in urban areas. Scheduled Castes and Tribes make up 27.65% and 9.34% of the population respectively.

Religion in Palamu district (2011)
Religion	Percent
Hinduism	86.77%
Islam	12.28%
Other or not stated	0.95%

According to the census, 86.77% of the population follows Hinduism, while 12.28% follow Islam.

=== Languages ===
Languages of Palamu district (2011)
1. Hindi (65.5%)
2. Magahi (24.4%)
3. Urdu (6.87%)
4. Palmuha (1.15%)
5. Others (2.05%)
6. khortha (0.50%)

At the time of the 2011 Census of India, 65.49% of the population in the district spoke Hindi, 24.44% Magahi, 6.87% Urdu and 1.15% Palmuha as their first language.

== Education ==
- The only university in Medininagar is Nilamber-Pitamber University, created on 17 January 2009. The Chief Minister of Jharkhand declared that the Nilamber-Pitamber University would be set up in Medininagar in 2001.
- There are 66 primary schools, 30 middle schools, 17 Navsirijit schools, 10 high schools.
- There are two B.Ed. Colleges in Palamu district,
  - Kumaresh International B.Ed. College situated in Rajwadih, Daltonganj,(Palamu), Jharkhand.
  - Elite Public B.Ed. College Situated in Ranchi Road, Chianki, NH 75, Medininagar, Jharkhand.
- There is 1 Law Colleges in the Redma, Medininagar in the Palamu district is Bhishma Narain Singh Law College founded by the Babusahab Bhisma narain Singh of Namudag royal family.
- There are 2 Medical Colleges in the Palamu district,
  - Medini Rai Medical College and Hospital, Palamu (Jharkhand Govt. medical college)
  - Laxmi Chandravansi Medical College and Hospital, Palamu
- There are 2 Engineering Colleges in the Palamu district,
  - Government Engineering College, Palamu (GEC Palamu)
  - DAV Institute Of Engineering & Technology (DAVIET) , Medininagar, Jharkhand was established in 2008.The Institute is approved by AICTE, New Delhi and Affiliated to Nilamber-Pitamber University, Medininagar, Palamau (Jharkhand). This is the first degree level Engineering institute started by the DAV College Trust and Management Society, New Delhi in Jharkhand.

== Places of Interest ==
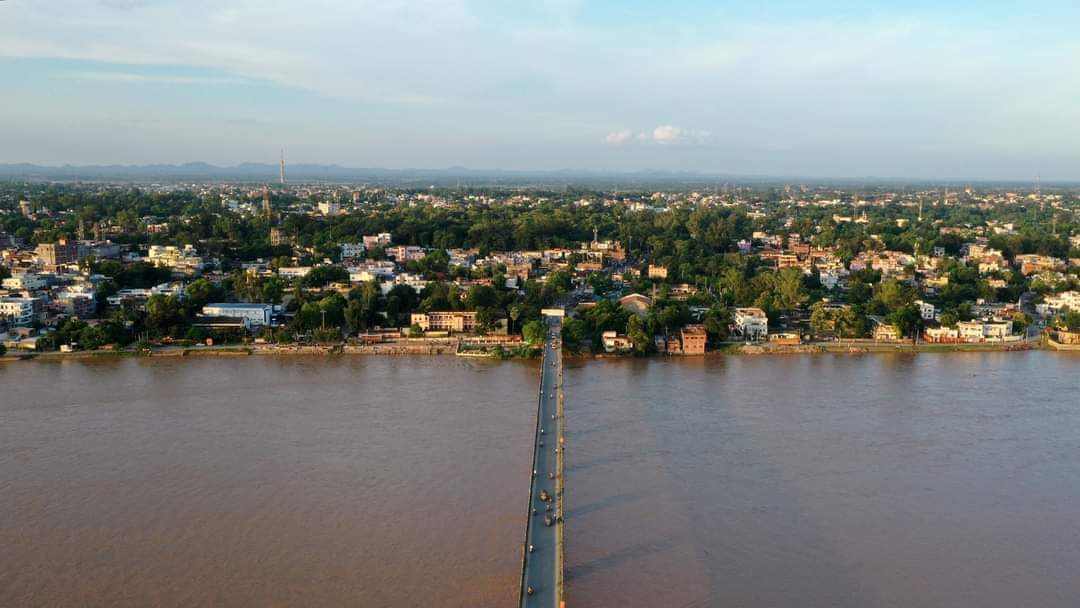
View of Medininagar from Koyal River

- Betla National Park, park hosts a wide variety of wildlife
- Palamau Tiger Reserve, one of the first tiger conservation projects in India whose brand ambassador is MS Dhoni
- Palamu fort, built in the 15th century a twin forts structure by Medini Ray
- Kechki Forest Rest House, a shooting location for Satyajit Ray’s 1970 film Aranyer Din Ratri (Days and Nights in the Forest), located about 19 km from Medininagar (Daltonganj) in Palamu district, Jharkhand.

== Transport ==
=== Roadways ===
- NH 39 which passes through Medininagar, formerly Daltonganj (Palamu district) which connects Ranchi and Jhansi(in U.P.) by which Daltonganj is connected by Garhwa, Latehar and Ranchi city.
- NH 139 which connects Medininagar, formerly Daltonganj (Palamu district) to Patna (in Bihar) by which Daltonganj is connected by Aurangabad, Daudnagar, Arwal and Patna city.
- Jharkhand State Highway 10 which starts from Daltonganj and passes through Lesliganj & Panki in Palamu district and ends in Balumath in Latehar district by which Daltonganj is connected by Chatra and Hazaribagh.

=== Railways ===
- Daltonganj railway station is situated in Medininagar, formerly Daltonganj (Palamu district) is on the Barkakana–Son Nagar line, by which it is connected by Kolkata, Delhi, Ranchi, Patna, Dhanbad, Bhopal, Jamshedpur, Varanasi, Dehri-on-Sone.

=== Airways ===
- Chianki Airport situated in NH 75, South Redma, Daltonganj (Palamu), Jharkhand 822101
