= Magahi language =

Indo-Aryan language spoken in India

Magahi
- Magadhi
- मगही
- The word "Magahi" written in Devanagari script
- Native to: India and Nepal
- Region: Magadha (southern Bihar, northern Jharkhand, and northwestern West Bengal), Terai region of Eastern Nepal
- Ethnicity: Magahi
- Native speakers: 12.7 million (2011 census) (additional speakers counted under Hindi)
- Language family: Indo-European: Indo-Iranian; Indo-Aryan; Eastern Zone (Magadhan); Bihari; Magahi
- Early forms: Magadhi Prakrit: Magadhan Apabhraṃśa; Abahattha
- Dialects: Southern Magahi; Northern Magahi; Central Magahi
- Writing system: Devanagari; Kaithi (formerly) Bengali (historically in Manbhum and Hazaribagh) Oriya (historically in Mayurbhanj)

Official status
- Recognised minority language in: India: Jharkhand (Note: additional official language of Jharkhand)

Language codes
- ISO 639-2: mag
- ISO 639-3: mag
- Glottolog: maga1260
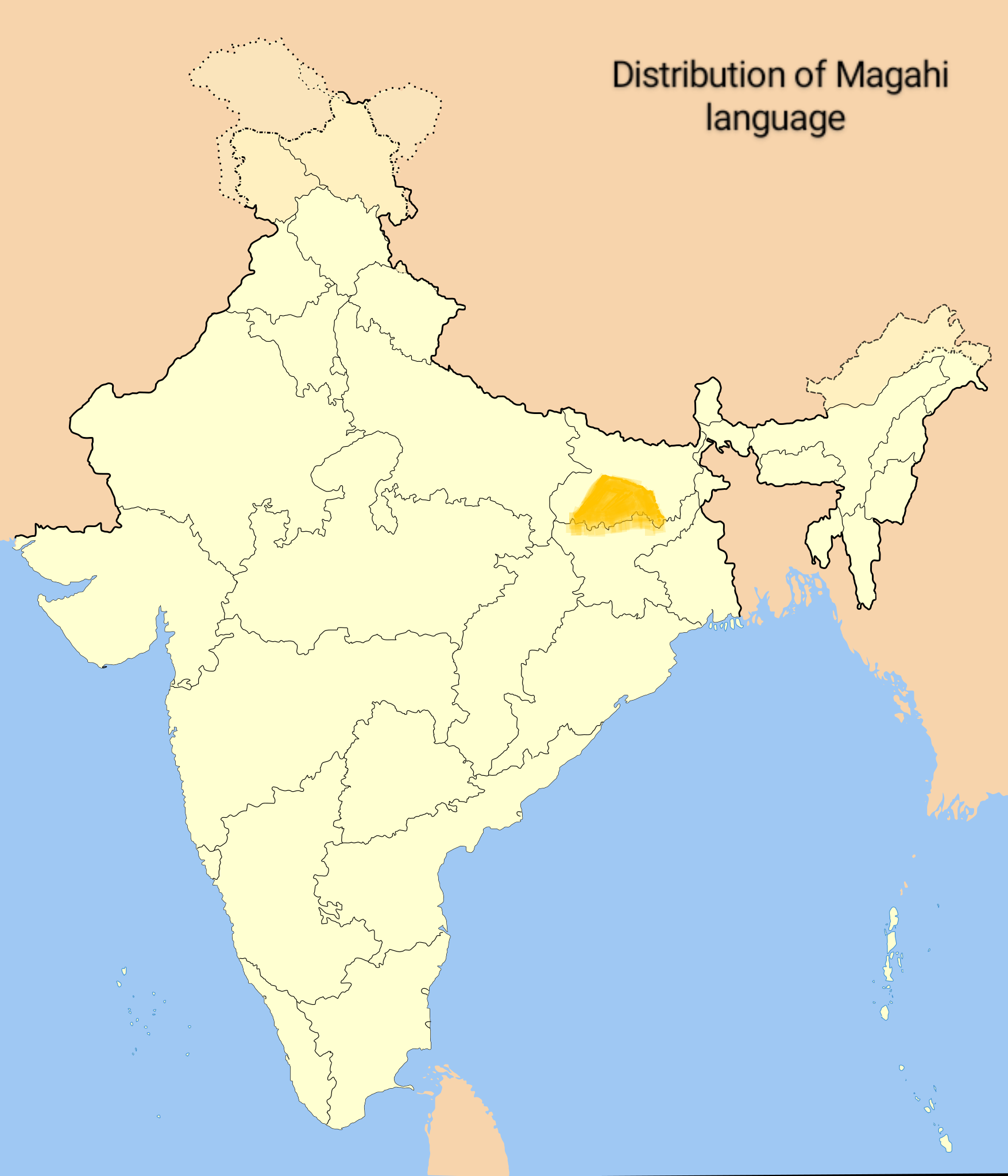
- Magahi speaking region

Magahi (𑂧𑂏𑂯𑂲), also known as Magadhi (𑂧𑂏𑂡𑂲), is an Indo-Aryan language spoken in Bihar, Jharkhand, and parts of West Bengal and Odisha in eastern India, and in the Terai region of Nepal. Magadhi Prakrit was the ancestor of Magahi, from which the latter's name derives.

It boasts a rich tradition of folk songs and stories. It is spoken in approximately twelve districts of Bihar (Gaya, Patna, Jehanabad, Aurangabad, Nalanda, Sheikhpura, Nawada, Lakhisarai, Arwal, Jamui and in some parts of Banka), twelve districts of Jharkhand (Hazaribag, Palamu, Chatra, Koderma, Jamtara, Bokaro, Dhanbad, Giridih, Deoghar, Garhwa, Latehar, Chatra) and in West Bengal's Malda district.

Magahi derived from the ancient Magadhi Prakrit, which was created in the ancient kingdom of Magadha, the core of which was the area south of the Ganges and east of Son River.

Though the number of speakers in Magahi is about 12.7 million, it has not been constitutionally recognised in India. In Bihar, Hindi is the language used for educational and official matters. Magahi was legally absorbed under Hindi in the 1961 Census.

== History ==
The ancestor of Magahi, Magadhi Prakrit, formed in the Indian subcontinent. These regions were part of the ancient kingdom of Magadha, the core of which was the area of Bihar south of the river Ganga.

The name Magahi is directly derived from the word Magadhi.

The development of the Magahi language into its current form is unknown. However, according to linguists, Magahi along with Assamese, Bengali, Bhojpuri, Maithili and Odia originated from the Magadhi Prakrit during the 8th to 11th centuries. These different, but sister dialects differentiated themselves and took their own course of growth and development. But it is not certain when exactly it took place. It was probably such an unidentified period during which modern Indian languages begin to take modern shape. By the end of the 12th century, the development of Apabhramsa reached its climax. The distinct shape of Magadhi can be seen in the Dohakosha written by Sarahapa and Kauhapa.

Magadhi had a setback due to the transition period of the Magadha administration. Traditionally, strolling bards recite long epic poems in this dialect, and it was because of this that the word "Magadhi" came to mean "a bard". Devanagari is the most widely used script in present times, while Bengali and Odia scripts are also used in some regions and Magahi's old script was Kaithi script. The pronunciation in Magahi is not as broad as in Maithili and there are a number of verbal forms for each person. Historically, Magahi had no famous written literature. There are many popular songs throughout the area in which the language is spoken, and strolling bards recite various long epic poems which are known more or less over the whole of Northern India. In the Magahi speaking area, folk singers sing a good number of ballads.

The first success in spreading Hindi occurred in Bihar in 1881, when Hindi displaced Urdu as the official language of the province. After independence, Hindi was given the sole official status through the Bihar Official Language Act, 1950, ignoring the state's own languages.

Magahi Virah Geet, a folk song of separation and longing

== Geographical distribution ==
There are several dialects of Magahi. It is spoken in the area which formed the core of the ancient kingdom of Magadha - the modern districts of Patna, Nalanda, Gaya, Jehanabad, Arwal, Aurangabad, Lakhisarai, Sheikhpura and Nawada. Magahi is bounded on the north by Maithili spoken in Mithila across the Ganga. On the west it is bounded by the Bhojpuri and on the northeast it is bounded by Angika. A blend of Magahi known as Khortha is spoken by non-tribal populace in North Chotanagpur division of Jharkhand which comprises districts of Bokaro, Chatra, Palamu, Dhanbad, Giridih, Hazaribagh, Koderma and Ramgarh. People of Southern Bihar and Northern Jharkhand are mostly speakers of Magahi. Magahi is also spoken in Malda district of West Bengal. According to 2011 Census, there were approximately 12.7 million Magahi speakers. Apart from India it is spoken in various districts of south eastern Nepal.

== Phonology ==
=== Consonants ===
		Labial	Dental/ Alveolar	Retroflex	Post-alv./ Palatal	Velar	Glottal
Nasal	voiced	m	n			ŋ	
Nasal	breathy	mʱ	nʱ				
Stop/ Affricate	voiceless	p	t	ʈ	tʃ	k	
Stop/ Affricate	aspirated	pʰ	tʰ	ʈʰ	tʃʰ	kʰ	
Stop/ Affricate	voiced	b	d	ɖ	dʒ	ɡ	
Stop/ Affricate	breathy	bʱ	dʱ	ɖʱ	dʒʱ	ɡʱ	
Fricative			s				h
Approximant	voiced	w	l		j		
Approximant	breathy		lʱ				
Tap	voiced		ɾ	ɽ			
Tap	breathy		ɾʱ	ɽʱ			

=== Vowels ===
	Front	Central	Back
High	i		u
Mid	e	ə	o
Low		aː	
Diphthongs	əi		əu

- /i, u/ may also be heard as lower [ɪ, ʊ] in shortened positions.
- /e, o/ may also be heard as lower [ɛ, ɔ] in more initial positions.
- /ə/ can also be heard as [ʌ] in more stressed positions.

=== Kinship terms ===
Some common kinship terms:

Sr. No.	Magahi Word	IPA Pronunciation	English Word
1	बाबू जी	[baːbuː dʒiː]	Father
2	माय	[maːj]	Mother
3	लइका	[lə.ɪ.kaː]	Son
4	लइकी	[lə.ɪ.kiː]	Daughter
5	भइया	[bʰə.jaː]	Elder Brother
6	भौजी	[bʰəʊ.dʒiː]	Sister-in-law (brother's wife)
7	दीदी	[diː.diː]	Elder Sister
8	बहिन	[bə.ɦɪn]	Younger Sister
9	बाबा	[baːbaː]	Paternal Grandfather
10	मामा	[maːmaː]	Paternal Grandmother
11	नाना	[naː.naː]	Maternal Grandfather
12	नानी	[naː.niː]	Maternal Grandmother
13	मरद	[mə.rəd]	Husband
14	मेहरारू	[me.hə.raː.ruː]	Wife
15	सासु	[saːsuː]	Mother-in-law
16	ससुर	[sə.suɾ]	Father-in-law
17	देबर	[de.bəɾ]	Brother-in-law (husband's younger brother)
18	जेठ	[dʒeʈʰ]	Husband's Elder Brother
19	ननद	[nənəd]	Husband's Sister
20	पुतोह	[pʊ.t̪oːɦ]	Daughter-in-law
22	चाचा	[tʃaː.tʃaː]	Paternal Uncle (Younger)
24	चाची	[tʃaː.tʃiː]	Aunt (Younger Uncle's Wife)
25	मामू	[maːmuː]	Maternal Uncle
26	ममानी	[mə.maːniː]	Maternal Uncle's Wife
27	मौसी	[məʊ.siː]	Maternal Aunt
28	मौसा	[məʊ.saː]	Maternal Aunt's Husband
29	फूआ	[pʰuːaː]	Paternal Aunt
30	फूफा	[pʰuː.pʰaː]	Paternal Aunt's Husband
31	भतीजा	[bʰə.t̪iː.dʒaː]	Nephew
32	भतीजी	[bʰə.t̪iː.dʒiː]	Niece

== See also ==
- Culture of Magadh Region
- Culture of Bhojpuri Region
- Culture of Mithila Region
- Culture of Angika Region
- Pāli, the canonical language of Theravada Buddhism traditionally associated with the language of Magadhi
- Phool Bahadur
- Bhaiyaa
