= Yogeshwar =

Yogeshwar may refer to:

- Yogeshwara, a Sanskrit epithet for the Hindu gods Krishna and Shiva
- Yogeshwar (name), a personal name (including a list of people with the name)
- Yogeshwar (mountain), a mountain in the Himalayas
- 20522 Yogeshwar, a minor planet

== See also ==
- Yogeshvari, an epithet of the Hindu goddess Durga
- Yogeswaran, an Indian surname
- Jogeshwari, suburb of Mumbai, India
