= Hatakeshvara =

Epithet of Hindu god Shiva

Hatakeshvara (Sanskrit: हाटकेश्वर, romanized: Hāṭakeśvara) is an epithet of the Hindu deity Shiva. It means, "the lord of the Hataka people". The term is also applied to the pilgrimage site associated with the deity.

== Literature ==
According to the Skanda Purana, the Suryavamsha King Dasharatha, the ruler of Ayodhya, had performed a long penance to Vishnu for obtaining heirs. He began his penance by visiting many pilgrimage spots in the region of Kartikeyapura, starting with Hatakeshvara. The site was selected by him because his father Aja had also performed penance at the same spot earlier to appease the deity and obtained certain siddhis. After finishing his pilgrimage, Dasharatha created a massive temple for Vishnu at Hatakeshvara and installed an idol of the deity within.

In the hundred and second chapter of the text, there is also a mention of Rama visiting Vibhishana to bid him farewell before leaving the earth, after Lakshmana had already attained samadhi. On his way back, the pushpaka vimana refused to move ahead till Rama got out of it and visited the shrine consecrated by his father. After taking bath in the pond in front of the temple, Rama installed a lingam in memory of his brother Lakshmana, and also another one in memory of his wife Sita. Thereafter, he spent a few days at the pilgrim spot of his ancestors and then headed back to Ayodhya.

== See also ==
- Bholanatha
- Parameshvara
- Dakshinamurti
