= Hansa and Dimbhaka =

Hansa and Dimbhaka were two warriors mentioned in the Hindu epic Mahabharata. They both served the king Jarasandha and assisted him during his during his attempts to retake Mathura. During the Sabha Parva, a king also named Hansa was slain by Balarama after an eighteen-day battle. Upon hearing the news of Hansa's death, Dimbhaka thought that his Hansa had been killed. He threw himself into the river Yamuna and committed suicide. Then the real Hansa heard of Dimbhaka's suicide and killed himself in the same manner.

Mythologist Devdutt Pattanaik in an editorial published in The Times of India pointed out the story also mentions Hansa's widow and said that, "If a gay mythologist had interpreted this story so, he could easily have been trolled for ‘manipulating Sanskrit texts based on Westernised ideas and creating a false Hindu history’."
