= Manika Assembly constituency =

Constituency of the Jharkhand legislative assembly in India

Coordinates: 23.87°N 84.36°E

Manika
- Constituency No. 73 for the Jharkhand Legislative Assembly

Constituency details
- Country: India
- Region: East India
- State: Jharkhand
- District: Latehar
- Lok Sabha constituency: Chatra
- Established: 2000
- Total electors: 238,041
- Reservation: ST

Member of Legislative Assembly
- 5th Jharkhand Legislative Assembly
- Incumbent Ramchandra Singh
- Party: INC
- Alliance: MGB
- Elected year: 2024

Manika Assembly constituency is an assembly constituency in the Indian state of Jharkhand. It was previously in Latehar Assembly constituency. In 1977 it was partitioned forming new 'Manika (Vidhan Sabha Constituency)'.

== Members of Legislative Assembly ==
Election	Name	Party
Bihar Legislative Assembly
Before 1977: Constituency did not exist
1977	Yamuna Singh	Janata Party
1980	Yamuna Singh	Bharatiya Janata Party
1985	Yamuna Singh	Bharatiya Janata Party
1990	Yamuna Singh	Bharatiya Janata Party
1995	Ramchandra Singh	Janata Dal
2000	Yamuna Singh	Bharatiya Janata Party
Jharkhand Legislative Assembly
2005	Ramchandra Singh	Rashtriya Janata Dal
2009	Harikrishna Singh	Bharatiya Janata Party
2014	Harikrishna Singh	Bharatiya Janata Party
2019	Ramchandra Singh	Indian National Congress
2024	Ramchandra Singh	Indian National Congress

== Election results ==
=== Assembly election 2024 ===
2024 Jharkhand Legislative Assembly election: Manika
Party	Candidate	Votes	%	±%
INC	Ramchandra Singh	74,946	42.50%	▼6.77
BJP	Harikrishna Singh	58,092	32.94%	▼5.52
Independent	Muneshwar Oraon	18,748	10.63%	New
SP	Raghupal Singh	8,403	4.76%	▲2.81
JLKM	Balwant Singh	3,583	2.03%	New
Hindustani Awam Manch (United)	Atul Kumar Singh	2,820	1.60%	New
Independent	Rakesh Kumar Singh	2,747	1.56%	New
NOTA	None of the Above	5,030	2.85%	▼0.46
Margin of victory		16,854	9.56%	▼1.26
Turnout		1,76,351	67.62%	▲4.52
Registered electors		2,60,816		▲9.57
INC hold		Swing	▼6.77	

=== Assembly election 2019 ===
2019 Jharkhand Legislative Assembly election: Manika
Party	Candidate	Votes	%	±%
INC	Ramchandra Singh	74,000	49.27%	▲27.58
BJP	Raghupal Singh	57,760	38.46%	▲13.75
SP	Victor Kerketta	2,941	1.96%	New
BSP	Hardayal Singh	2,476	1.65%	New
Independent	Ram Lagan Singh	1,945	1.30%	New
Communist Party of India (Marxist Leninist) Liberation	Rajendra Singh	1,867	1.24%	New
JVM(P)	Rajpal Singh	1,656	1.10%	New
NOTA	None of the Above	4,980	3.32%	▼0.33
Margin of victory		16,240	10.81%	▲9.97
Turnout		1,50,190	63.09%	▲3.32
Registered electors		2,38,041		▲11.29
INC gain from BJP		Swing	▲24.57	

=== Assembly election 2014 ===
2014 Jharkhand Legislative Assembly election: Manika
Party	Candidate	Votes	%	±%
BJP	Harikrishna Singh	31,583	24.70%	▲2.72
RJD	Ramchandra Singh	30,500	23.86%	▲5.92
INC	Muneshwar Oraon	27,731	21.69%	▲1.80
AITC	Neera Devi	6,326	4.95%	New
JMM	Shilpa Kumari	5,975	4.67%	▲0.78
Independent	Anita Minj	4,750	3.72%	New
CPI	Ganesh Bhagat	4,027	3.15%	New
NOTA	None of the Above	4,660	3.65%	New
Margin of victory		1,083	0.85%	▼1.24
Turnout		1,27,846	59.77%	▲4.17
Registered electors		2,13,888		▲40.20
BJP hold		Swing	▲2.72	

=== Assembly election 2009 ===
2009 Jharkhand Legislative Assembly election: Manika
Party	Candidate	Votes	%	±%
BJP	Harikrishna Singh	18,645	21.98%	▲10.52
INC	Rameshwar Oraon	16,876	19.90%	New
RJD	Ramchandra Singh	15,214	17.94%	▼1.40
Jharkhand Janadikhar Manch	Muneshwar Oraon	7,425	8.75%	New
JMM	Amrit Joy Kujur	3,300	3.89%	▼8.23
Independent	Janeshwar Singh	3,057	3.60%	New
Communist Party of India (Marxist Leninist) Liberation	Kanhai Singh	2,349	2.77%	▲0.06
Margin of victory		1,769	2.09%	▼5.14
Turnout		84,825	55.60%	▼1.61
Registered electors		1,52,558		▼36.21
BJP gain from RJD		Swing	▲2.64	

=== Assembly election 2005 ===
2005 Jharkhand Legislative Assembly election: Manika
Party	Candidate	Votes	%	±%
RJD	Ramchandra Singh	26,460	19.34%	▼7.11
JMM	Dr. Deepak Oraon	16,577	12.12%	▲8.12
BJP	Yamuna Singh	15,680	11.46%	▼25.59
Communist Party of India (Marxist Leninist) Liberation	Jai Prakash Minj	3,709	2.71%	▼11.68
Independent	Rajeshwar Singh	3,419	2.50%	New
BSP	Hardayal Singh	2,703	1.98%	▼0.05
Independent	Jitendra Singh	2,548	1.86%	New
Margin of victory		9,883	7.22%	▼3.37
Turnout		1,36,824	57.21%	▲23.58
Registered electors		2,39,166		▲78.70
RJD gain from BJP		Swing	▼17.71	

=== Assembly election 2000 ===
2000 Bihar Legislative Assembly election: Manika
Party	Candidate	Votes	%	±%
BJP	Yamuna Singh	16,674	37.05%	New
RJD	Ramchandra Singh	11,905	26.45%	New
INC	Rajeshwar Singh	7,239	16.08%	New
Communist Party of India (Marxist Leninist) Liberation	Jai Prakash Minj	6,477	14.39%	New
JMM	Vinod Kumar Bhagat	1,799	4.00%	New
BSP	Nirmal Lakra	911	2.02%	New
Margin of victory		4,769	10.60%	
Turnout		45,005	34.34%	
Registered electors		1,33,838		
BJP win (new seat)				

== See also ==
- Vidhan Sabha
- List of states of India by type of legislature
