= List of Hindu deities =

List of deities in Hinduism

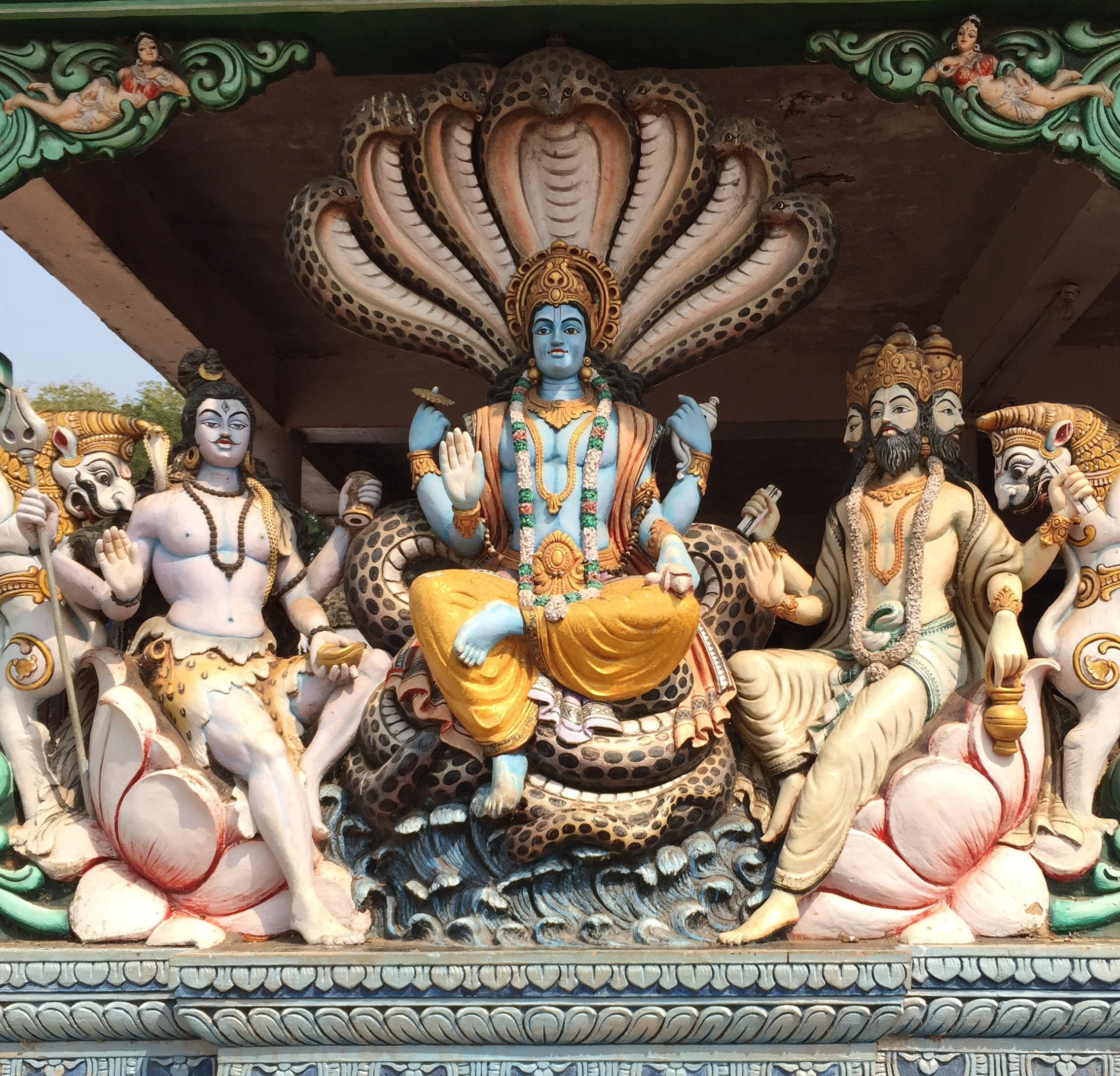
The Trimurti - Shiva (left), Vishnu (centre), Brahma (right), the supreme trinity of contemporary Hinduism

Hinduism is the largest religion in the Indian subcontinent, and the third largest religion in the world. It has been called the "oldest religion" in the world, and many practitioners refer to Hinduism as "the eternal law" (Sanātana Dharma). Within this faith, there are four major traditions or denominations, namely, Vaishnavism, Shaivism, Shaktism, and Smartism,Ganapatya and Saurism. Shiva, Durga, Parvati, Vishnu, Brahma, Lakshmi, and Saraswati are some of the major deities in Hinduism.

The religion is a diverse system of thought with a wide variety of beliefs, and hence the concept of God, and the number of deities, rests upon the philosophy and the tradition that make up a devotee's adherence. The faith is described by some to be monotheistic, where all deities are believed to be forms of Brahman, the Ultimate Reality, as popularised by the Advaita philosophy. It is also widely regarded to be polytheistic and henotheistic, though this is also considered to be a form of overgeneralisation.

== Deities ==
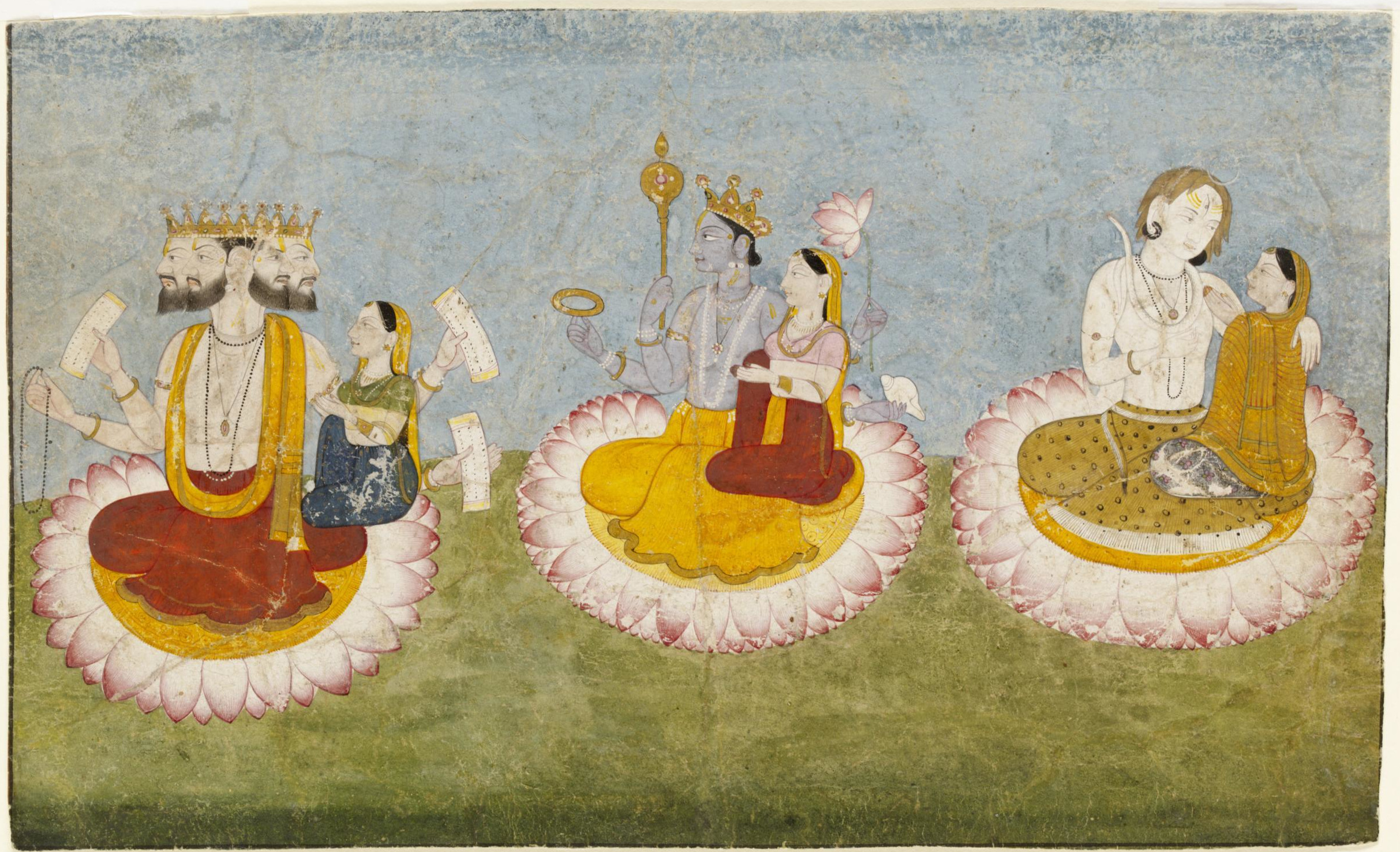
Brahma, Vishnu and Shiva seated on lotuses with their consorts Saraswati, Lakshmi and Parvati

=== Trimurti ===
The Trimurti are the most prominent deities of contemporary Hinduism. This consists of Brahma - the Creator, Vishnu - the Preserver, and Shiva - the Destroyer. Their feminine counterparts are Saraswati - the wife of Brahma, Lakshmi - the wife of Vishnu, and Parvati - the wife of Shiva.

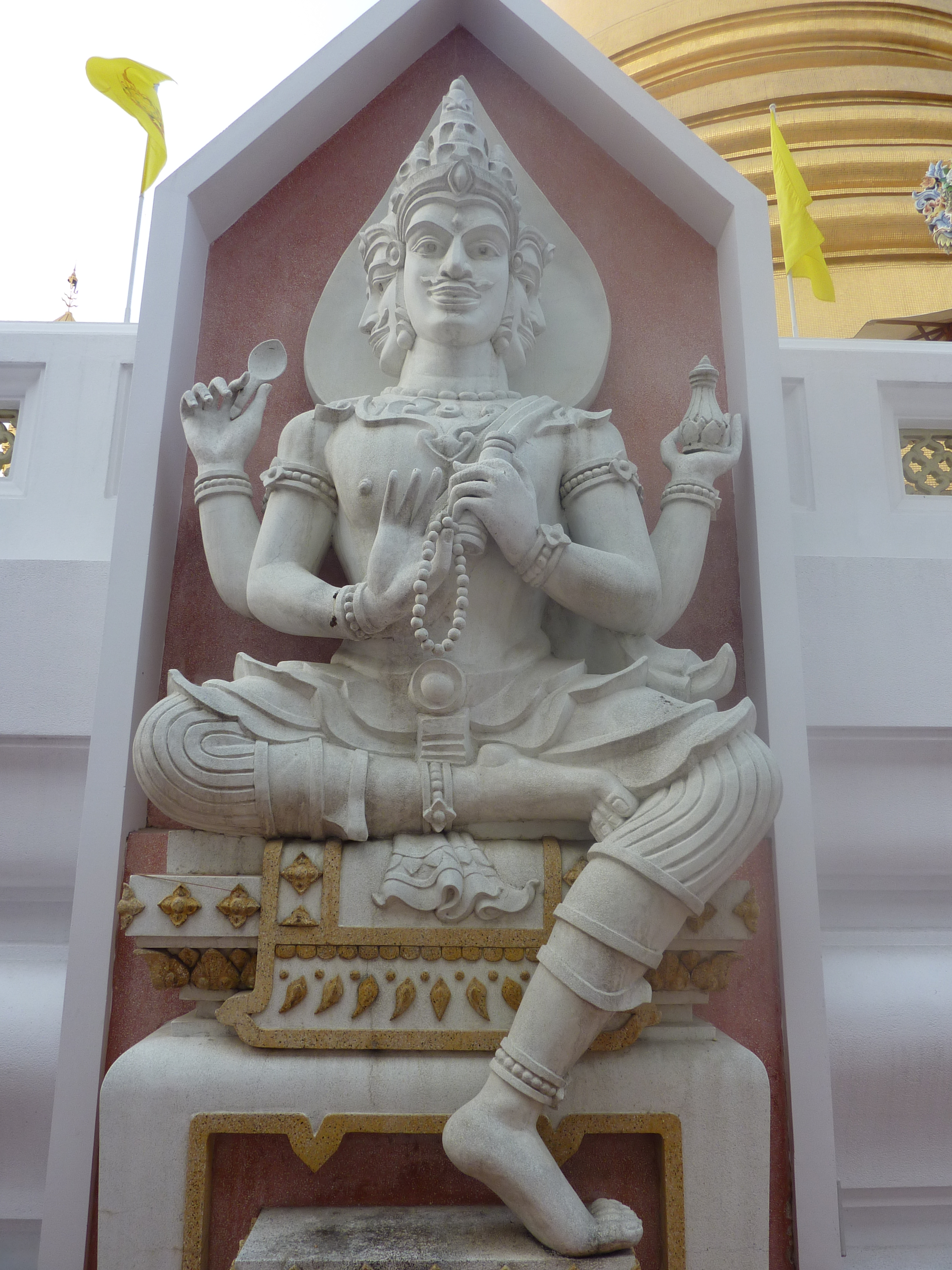
Statue of Brahma

==== Brahma ====
Brahma is the god of creation, and the first of the Trimurti. His consort, as well as his shakti (divine energy), is Saraswati, the goddess of learning. He is identified with the Vedic creator god, Prajapati. His abode is at Satyaloka. The deity is said to have been born out of a lotus that grew out of the navel of Vishnu. He was given the four Vedas by Vishnu, and instructed to commence the act of creation. Brahman is not widely revered in contemporary Hinduism, as no major tradition emerged around his worship, as they did for Vishnu and Shiva. Some of the epithets offered to Brahman include:

- Vedanatha
- Chaturmukha
- Prajapati
- Vedagarbha
- Kaushala

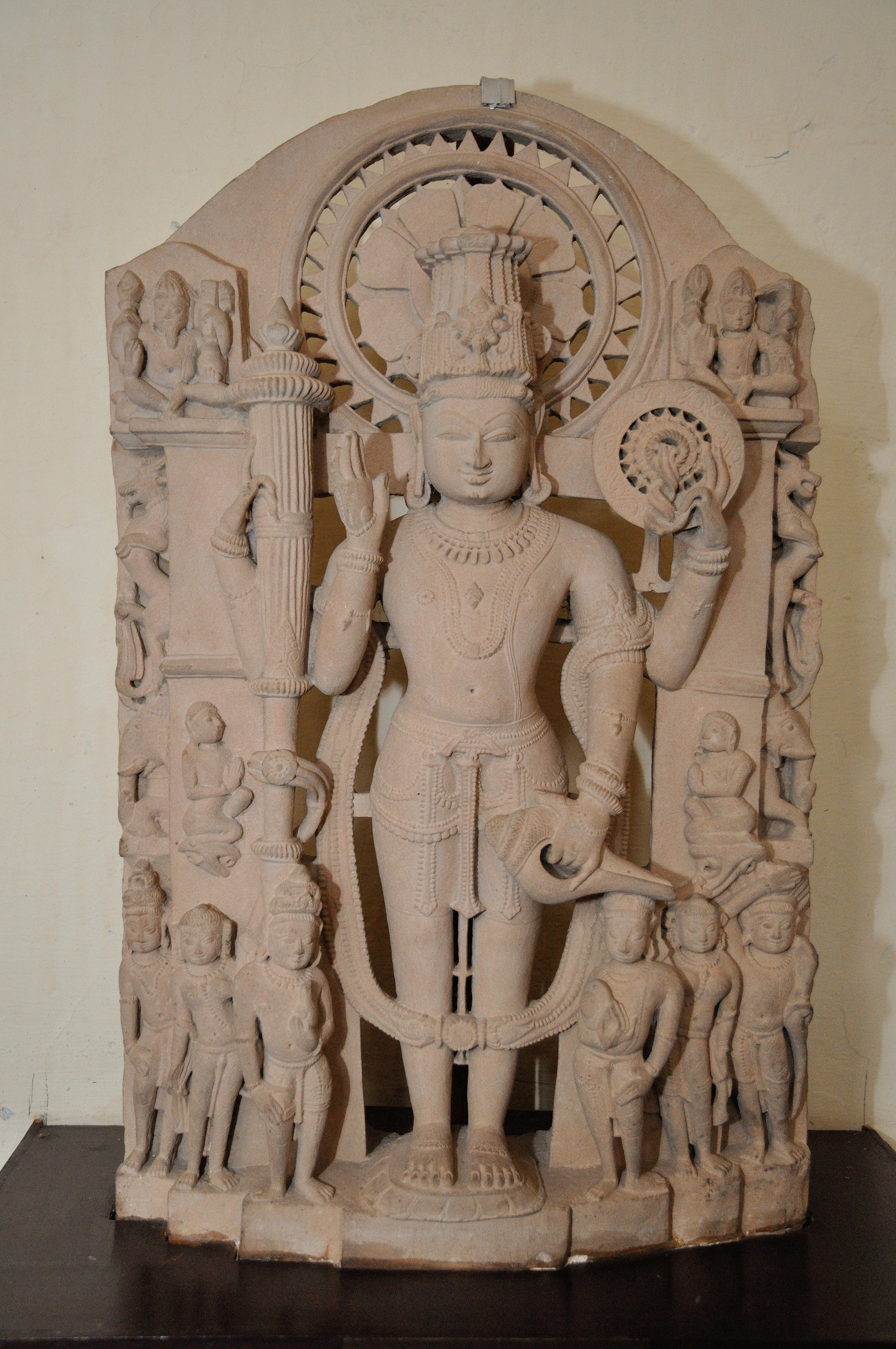
Statue of Vishnu

==== Vishnu ====
Vishnu is the god of preservation, and the second of the Trimurti. He is generally regarded to be the entity who is most often involved in mortal affairs. His consort, as well as his Shakti (divine energy), is Lakshmi, the goddess of prosperity. His abode is at Vaikuntha, where he reclines on the divine serpent, Shesha. He is regarded to have undertaken ten major incarnations upon the earth for the restoration of dharma and cosmic order, for the sake of the devas and human beings. The most prominent of these incarnations are Rama and Krishna. His adherents are called the Vaishnavas, who regard him to be the supreme deity. Some of the epithets and forms of the preserver deity are:

- Vithoba
- Narayana
- Perumal
- Jagannatha
- Hayagriva
- Achyuta
- Madhava
- Venkateshwara
- Guruvayurappan
- Vaikuntha Chaturmurti
- Vaikuntha Kamalaja
- Lakshmi Narayana
- Vishvarupa
- Ranganatha
- Madhusudana
- Padmanabha
- Hari
- Upulvan
- Purushottama
- Govinda
- Caturvyūha
- Keshava

The Dashavatara refers to the ten major incarnations of Vishnu. Various versions exist, and none can be presented as standard. The inclusion of Krishna as 8th and Buddha as 9th is most accepted, being found in Puranas and other texts and used in North Indian Bhagavatism, Sadh Vaishnavism, and ISKCON:

1. Matsya, the fish
2. Kurma, the tortoise
3. Varaha, the boar
4. Narsimha, the man-lion
5. Vamana, the dwarf
6. Parashurama, the Brahmin warrior
7. Rama, the king, hero of epic Ramayana and the slayer of Ravana
8. Krishna, a central character in the Mahabharata and the Bhagavad Gita, the slayer of Kamsa. Sometimes Balarama or both
9. Buddha, Balarama, Jagannath, or Vithoba
10. Kalki, the vanquisher of adharma, expected to appear at the end of the Kali Yuga

Balarama, the elder brother of Krishna, is sometimes featured as an avatar of Vishnu, replacing Buddha, though he is also widely considered in other traditions to be a form of Shesha, the serpent of Vishnu. Other significant forms of Vishnu include Prithu, Mohini, Dhanvantari, Kapila, Yajna, and a third of Dattatreya.

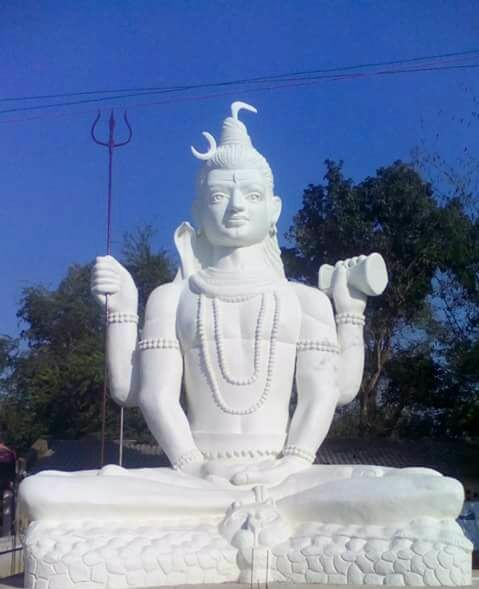
Statue of Shiva

==== Shiva ====
Shiva is the god of destruction, and the third of the Trimurti. His consort, as well as his shakti (divine energy), is Parvati, the goddess of power. His abode is upon the mountain Kailasha. He is often represented with two sons, Kartikeya and Ganesha. His mount is the bull called Nandi. He is usually depicted with a third eye, a crescent upon his forehead, the Ganges flowing from his head, and a blue throat occasioned by consuming the kalakuta poison produced at the churning of the ocean. His adherents are called Shaivas, who regard him to be the supreme deity.

Epithets

- Hara
- Rudra
- Virupaksha
- Manjunatha
- Bholenath
- Maheshvara

Avatars

Some of the major avatars and forms associated with Shiva include:

- Virabhadra
- Lingam
- Jyotirlinga
- Dakshinamurti
- Bhairava
- Pashupati
- Khandoba
- Durvasa
- Nataraja
- Ardhanarishvara
- Tripurantaka
- Mahakala
- Sharabha
- Ravananugraha
- Vaidishvara
- Lingodbhava
- Somaskanda
- Bhikshatana
- Dattatreya
- Hanuman

=== Tridevi ===
The Tridevi comprises the consorts of the Trimurti, as well as each of their shakti. They are the primary goddesses in contemporary Hinduism, believed to assist their respective consorts in their acts of creation, preservation, and destruction in the universe.

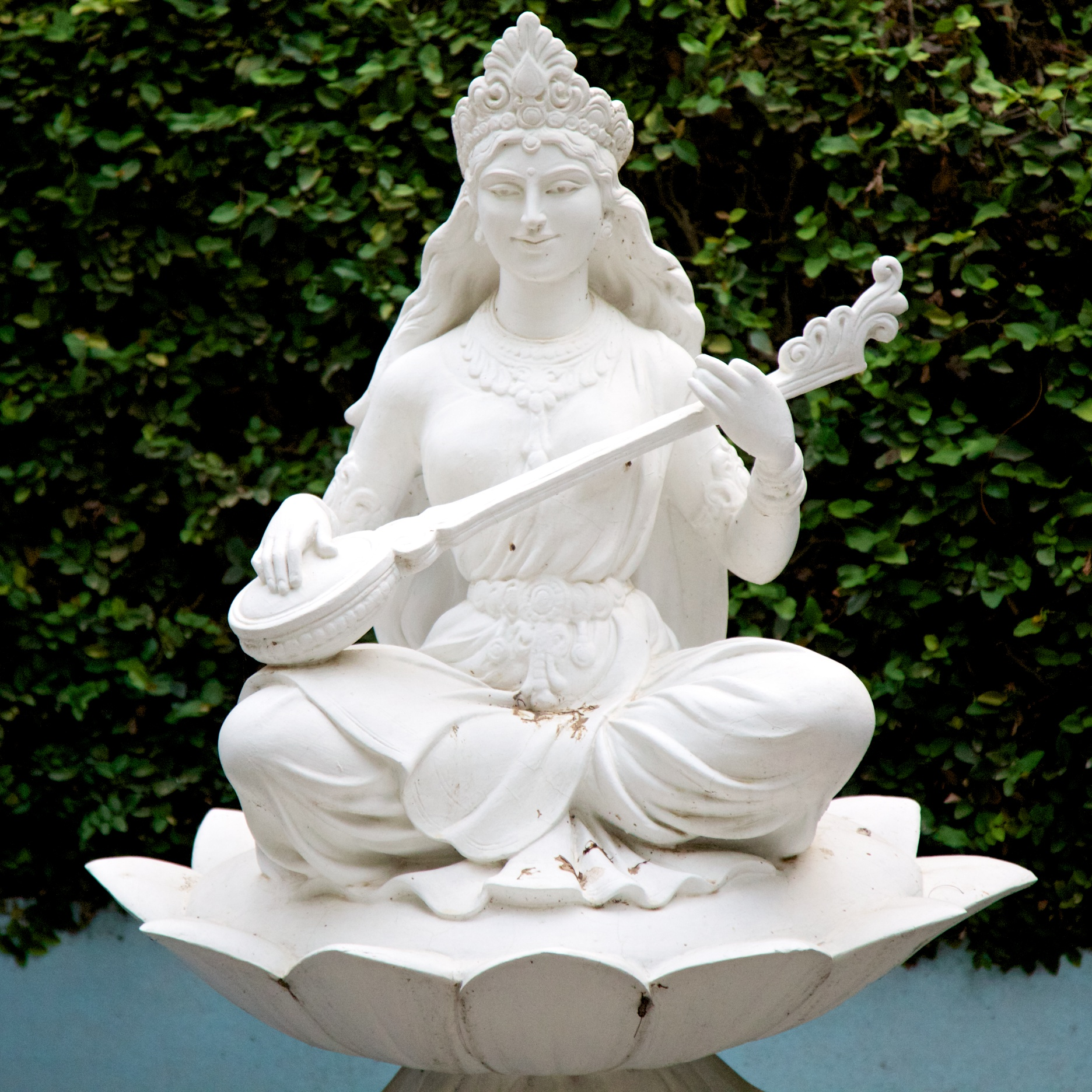
Statue of Saraswati

==== Saraswati ====
Saraswati is the goddess of learning, and also the patroness of music, art, and speech. The goddess is also regarded to be the power that resides within all poetry and writing. She is the consort of the creator deity, Brahma. She is represented as a graceful figure, donning white, and traditionally depicted with the veena (vīṇā), rosary (akṣamālā), water-pot (kamaṇḍalu) and book (pustaka). Her abode is at Satyaloka. Her mount is the white swan.

Saraswati is associated with the following forms:

- Savitri
- Vani
- Brahmani
- Maha Saraswati
- Gayatri
- Vāc
- Para Saraswati
- Shatarupa
- Medha
- Sharada
- Bharati
- Aditi
- Neel Saraswati

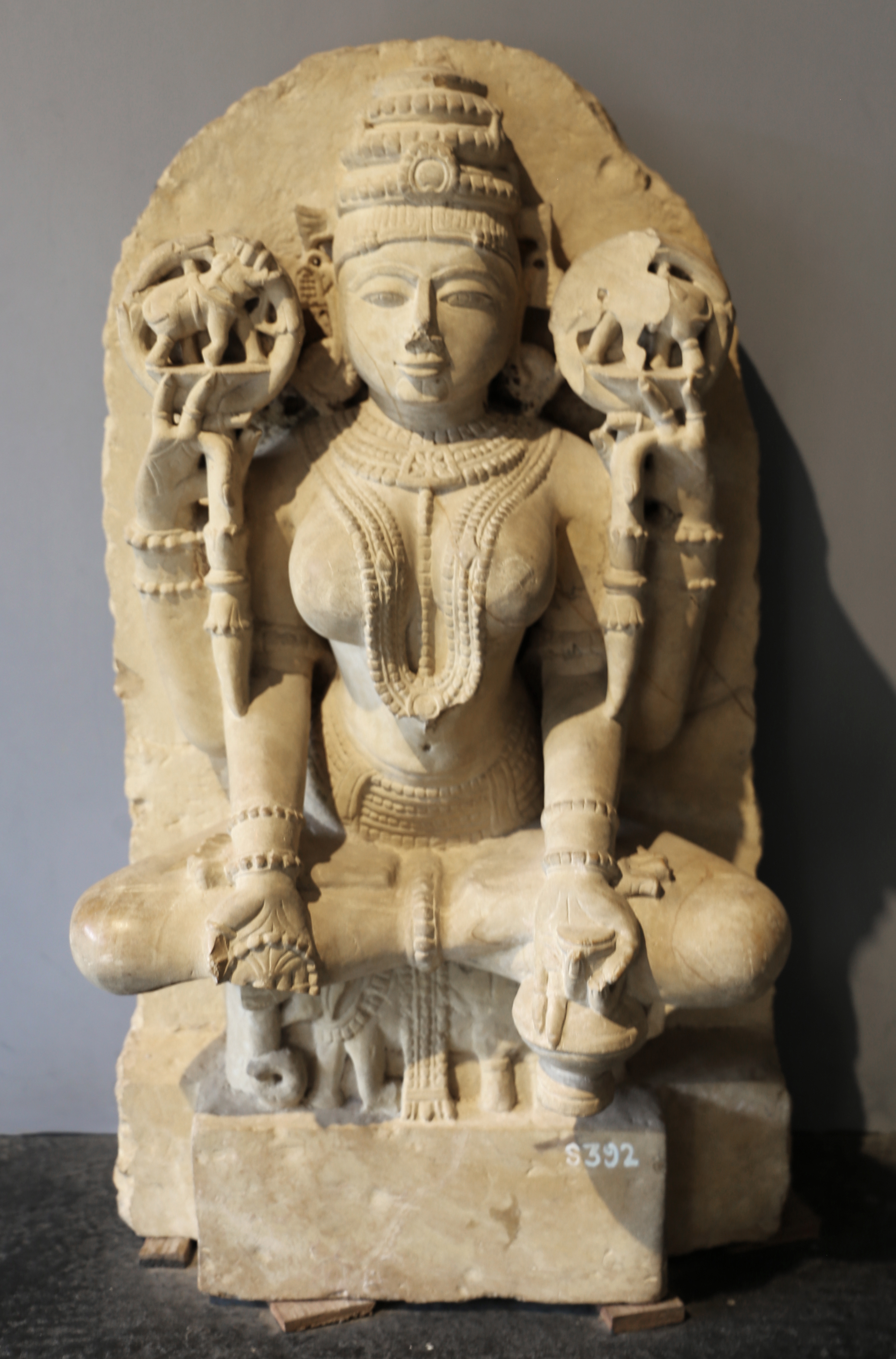
Sculpture of Lakshmi

==== Lakshmi ====
Lakshmi is the goddess of prosperity, associated with material and non-material wealth, fortune, and beauty. She is the consort of the preserver deity, Vishnu. Her origin is a central part of the Samudra Manthana, a significant event in the Puranas. According to the Lakshmi Tantra, the goddess Lakshmi, in her ultimate form of Mahasri, has four arms of a golden complexion, and holds a citron, a club, a shield, and a vessel containing amrita. The goddess is generally also considered to be serene and submissive to her consort. Her abode is at Vaikuntha. Her mount is typically an elephant or owl, though she is also usually seated on a lotus.

Avatars

- Bhumi
- Vedavati
- Sita, the consort of Rama
- Radha, the chief consort of Krishna.
- Gopis
- Ashtabharya
- Junior wives of Krishna
- Revati
- Padmavathi
- Niladevi
- Tulasi
- Rahi
- Andal
- Narasimhi
- Varahi
- Vaishno Devi, Hindu Mother Goddess and consort of Kalki

Ashta Lakshmi

- Adi Lakshmi, one who supports a seeker to reach their source, or Atman.
- Dhana Lakshmi, one who gives material wealth.
- Dhanya Lakshmi, one who gives wealth of agriculture.
- Gaja Lakshmi, one who gives animal wealth.
- Santana Lakshmi, one who bestows with offsprings.
- Dhairya Lakshmi, one who bestows valour during battles and courage plus strength for overcoming difficulties in life.
- Vijaya Lakshmi, one who bestows victory, not only in battles, but also for conquering hurdles in order to achieve success.
- Vidya Lakshmi, one who bestows the knowledge of arts and the sciences.

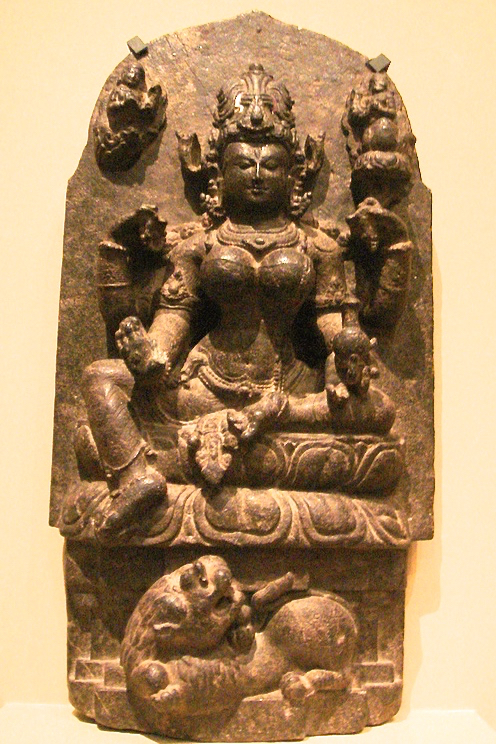
Sculpture of Parvati

==== Parvati ====
Parvati is the goddess of power, and is also associated with courage, fertility, and beauty. She is commonly referred to as Uma and Gauri. She is the consort of the destroyer deity, Shiva, and the daughter of Himavana. She is believed to be the reincarnation of Sati, the daughter of Daksha, who perished in the Daksha Yajna. In the Puranas, she performs a penance to marry Shiva, a celibate brahmachari, and the latter consents when he realises her true identity. When depicted alongside her consort, Parvati generally appears with two arms, but when alone, she is depicted having four, eight or ten arms, and is astride on a tiger or lion in which form she is known as Durga. She is generally considered to be a benevolent mother goddess, but also slays evil beings in her form of Kali. In goddess-centric traditions, Parvati is considered to be a complete incarnation of Adi Parashakti. Her abode is at Kailasha.

Avatars

- Durga, the goddess of strength, the slayer of Durgamasura and Mahishasura
- Annapurna, the goddess of food and nourishment
- Shitala, a regional goddess of diseases
- Bhramari, the goddess of bees
- Bhavani, a regional form of Parvati
- Meenakshi, patron goddess of Madurai
- Kamakhya and other goddesses of Shaktipeeth
- Bipadtarini, a regional goddess of protection from danger

In her fierce aspect of Kali, Parvati undertakes the following manifestations:

- Mahakali
- Bhadrakali
- Sri Kali
- Bhima Kali

Navadurga

In Shaivism-Shaktism, there exist nine forms of the goddess Durga.

- Shailaputri, The daughter of Himalayas.
- Brahmacharini
- Chandraghanta
- Kushmanda
- Skandamata
- Katyayani
- Kalaratri
- Mahagauri
- Siddhidhatri

Dasa Mahavidya

1. Kali: The fierce and powerful goddess representing time, change, and destruction.
2. Tara: Symbolizing the power of speech, she is associated with divine knowledge and guidance.
3. Tripura Sundari (Shodashi): The beautiful goddess of the three worlds, representing unity and the play of creation.
4. Bhuvaneshvari: The goddess of the material world, embodiment of space, and the nurturing aspect of the divine.
5. Bhairavi: The fierce aspect of Devi, associated with death, destruction, and the transformative power of time.
6. Chhinnamasta: Depicted as a self-decapitated goddess, symbolizing self-sacrifice, spiritual awakening, and the annihilation of the ego.
7. Dhumavati: The widow goddess associated with adversity, poverty, and the transformative power of suffering.
8. Bagalamukhi: The goddess who paralyzes enemies, symbolizing the power to control and manipulate reality.
9. Matangi: The goddess of inner wisdom, associated with speech, music, and the arts.
10. Kamalatmika (Kamala): The goddess of prosperity, symbolizing spiritual wealth and the unfolding of divine consciousness.

=== Other goddesses ===
Communities of goddess worship are ancient in India. In the Rigveda, the most prominent goddess is Ushas, the goddess of dawn. The regional goddesses venerated in Hinduism are generally syncretised with Parvati, Lakshmi, or Adi Parashakti. Some of the major goddesses revered in modern Hinduism include:

- Chandi, a form of Durga
- Korravai, the Tamil goddess of war and victory
- Yogamaya or Vindhyavasini, the embodiment of Vishnu's divine energy
- Shakambhari, a goddess of vegetation
- Sati, the first consort of Shiva and previous birth of Parvati.
- Gayatri, the personification of the Gayatri Mantra
- Ganga, the goddess personification of the Ganges river
- Yami, the personification of the river Yamuna
- Kaushiki, the goddess who emerges from Parvati
- Narmada, the personification of the river Narmada
- Shashthi, also known as Devasena, wife of Kartikeya, the goddess of children and reproduction
- Svaha, the goddess of sacrifices, daughter of Daksha and wife of Agni
- Manasa, a goddess of snakes and fertility
- Mariamman, the goddess of rain
- Mhalsa, a regional form of either Mohini or Parvati
- Renuka, mother of Parashurama
- Rahi, a regional form of Radha, consort of Vithoba
- Akilandeshwari, a form of Mahadevi
- Devi Kanya Kumari, patron goddess of Kanyakumari
- Dewi Danu

Matrikas

A group of ten mother goddesses make up the Matrikas:

- Brahmani
- Maheshwari
- Kaumari
- Vaishnavi
- Varahi
- Narasimhi
- Indrani
- Chamunda
- Vinayaki
- Shivaduti

== Pantheon ==
The Hindu pantheon is composed of deities that have developed their identities through both the scriptures of Hinduism as well as regional traditions that drew their legends from the faith. Some of the most popular deities of the Hindu pantheon include:

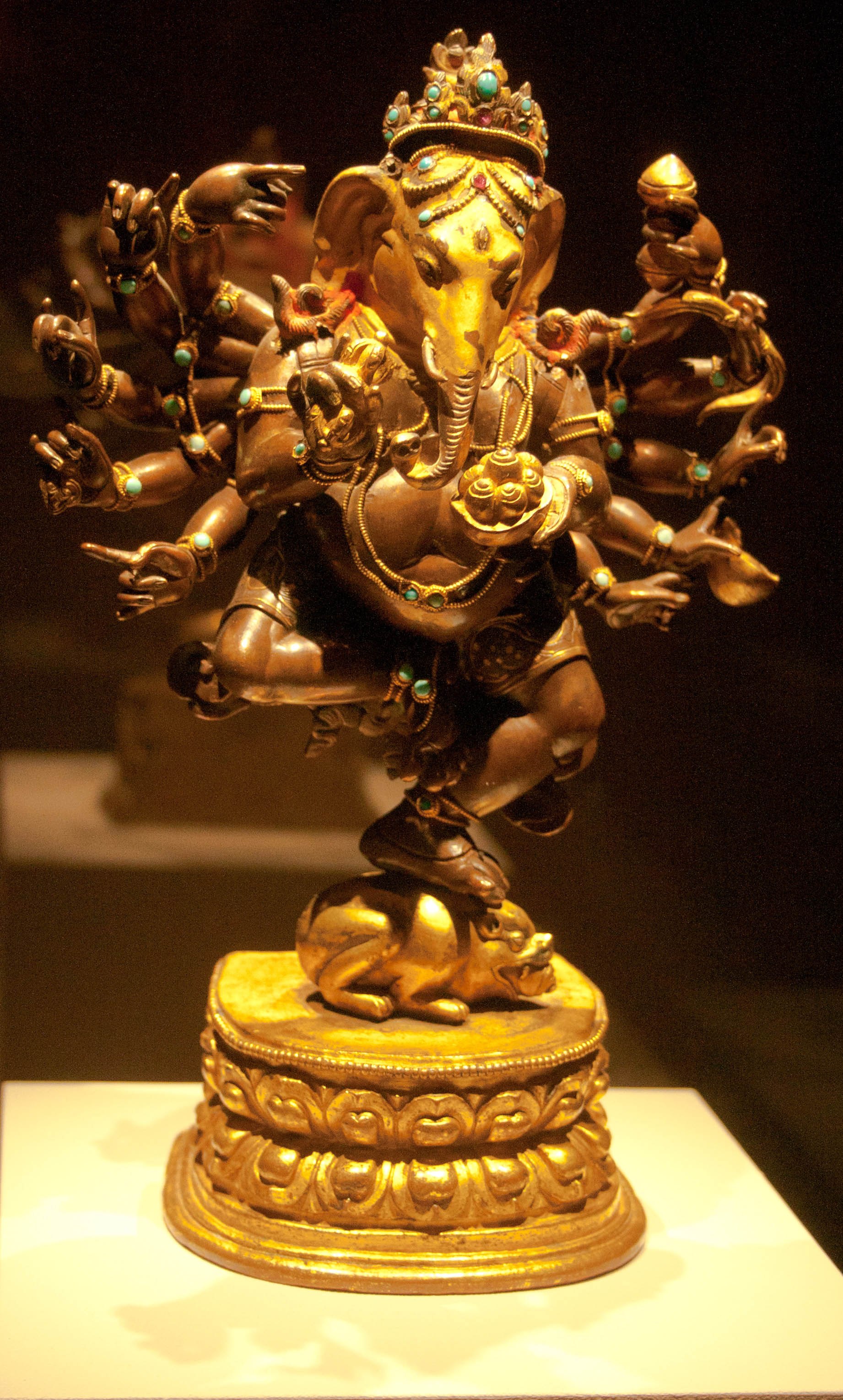
Statue of Ganesha

- Ganesha, also called Vinayaka and Ganapati, is a son of Shiva and Parvati. He is regarded to be a god of wisdom, and the remover of all obstacles. Several texts advocate his veneration before any other deity in rituals. The Ganapatya sect worships Ganesha as their chief deity.
- Kartikeya, also called Murugan and Subrahmanya, is a son of Shiva and Parvati. He is the commander of the devas, and a major god of war. The Kaumaram sect worships him as their chief deity.
- Ayyappan, also called Manikanta, is a regional deity, the son of Shiva and Mohini (a female incarnation of Vishnu).

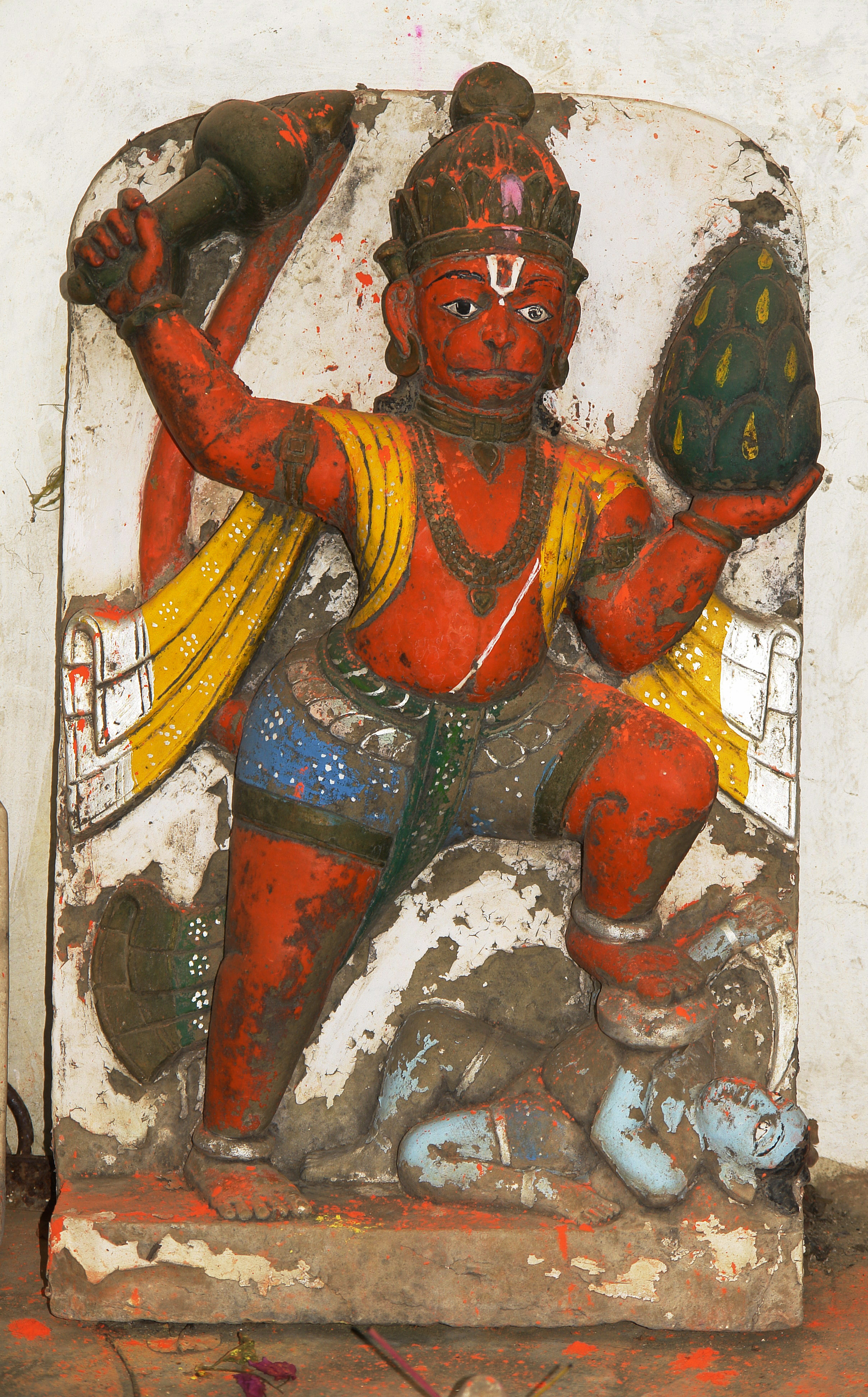
Statue of Hanuman

- Hanuman, also called Anjaneya and Maruti, is a vanara devotee of Rama. He is revered as the god of celibacy and strength.
- The Navagrahas are the personifications of the nine planets, revered in Vedic astrology and several temples.
- Kamadeva, also called Manmatha, is the god of love, a son of Vishnu.
- Rati is the goddess of love and pleasure, the consort of Kamadeva.
- Garuda is the eagle demigod mount of Vishnu.
- Shesha is the serpent demigod mount of Vishnu.
- Nandi is the bull mount of Shiva.
- Vasuki is the second king of the nagas.

== Vedic deities ==
The Rigveda speaks of Thirty-three gods called the Trayastrinshata ('Three plus thirty'). They consist of the 12 Adityas, the 8 Vasus, the 11 Rudras and the 2 Ashvins:– Dyauṣ "Sky", Pṛthivī "Earth", Vāyu "Wind", Agni "Fire", Nakṣatra "Stars", Varuṇa "Water", Sūrya "Sun", Chandra "Moon". The Twelve Ādityas (personified deities) – Vishnu, Aryaman, Indra (Śakra), Tvāṣṭṛ, Varuṇa, Bhaga, Savitṛ, Vivasvat, Aṃśa, Mitra, Pūṣan, Dhata. Indra also called Śakra, the supreme God, is the first of the 33, followed by Agni. Some of these brother gods were invoked in pairs such as Indra-Agni, Mitra-Varuna and Soma-Rudra.

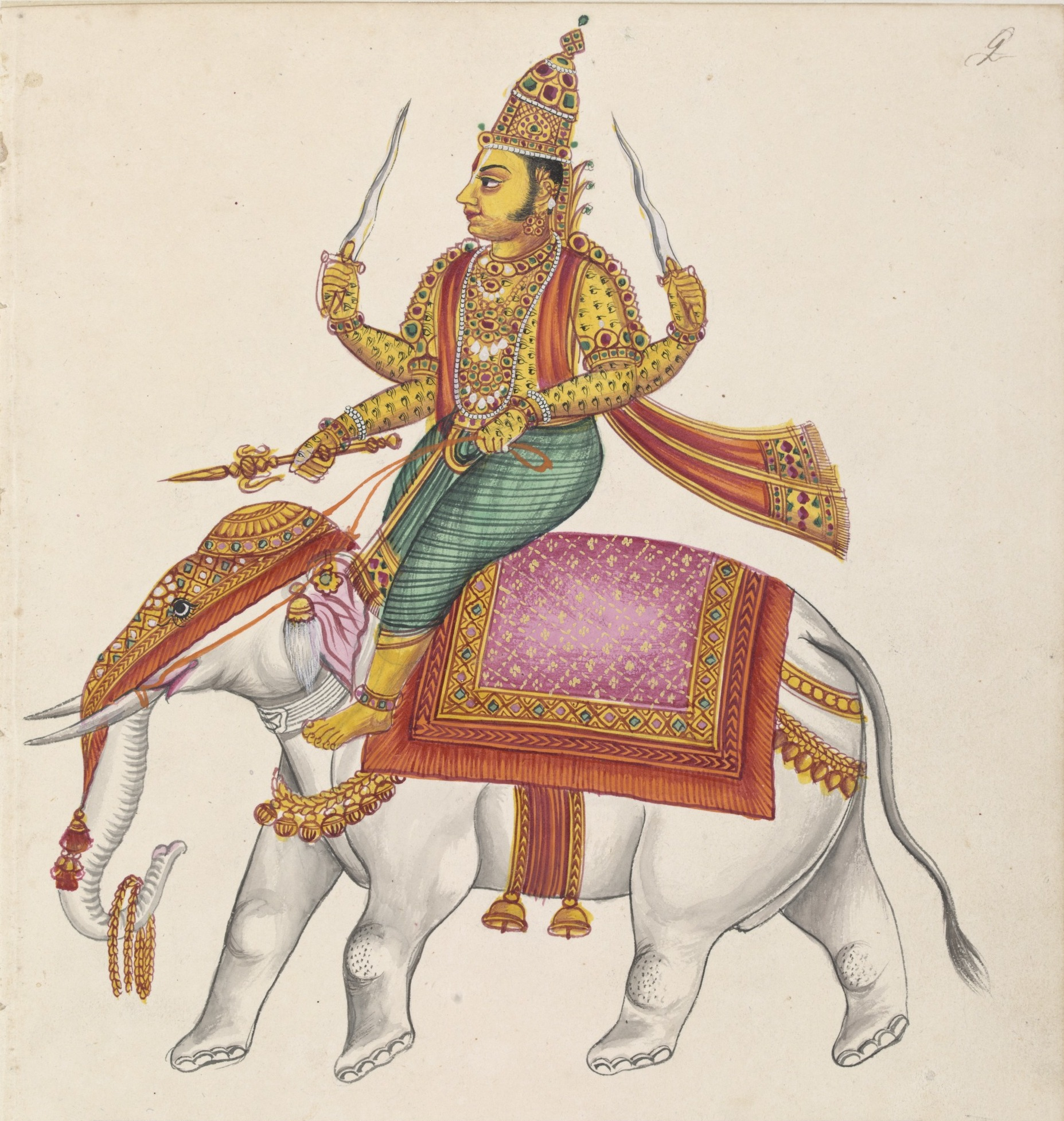
Painting of Indra

=== Adityas ===
- Mitra, the god of oaths, promises, and friendships
- Varuna, the god of water the seas, the oceans, and rain
- Indra, the supreme God and King of gods; also the god of heaven, weather, sovereignty, power, and war
- Savitr, the god of the morning sun; associated with Surya
- Aṃśa, solar deity; associated with Surya
- Aryaman the god of customs, hospitality, and marriages
- Bhaga, god of fortune
- Vivasvan, the god of the sun
- Tvaṣṭṛ, the god of architecture and smithing; blacksmith of the gods
- Pūshan, patron god of travellers and herdsmen, god of roads,
- Dhāta, god of health and magic, also called Dhūti
- Vishnu later known as his Vamana avatar.

=== Rudras ===
The Ramayana tells they are eleven of the 33 children of the sage Kashyapa and his wife Aditi, along with the 12 Adityas, 8 Vasus and 2 Ashvins, constituting the Thirty-three gods. The Vamana Purana describes the Rudras as the sons of Kashyapa and Aditi. The Matsya Purana notes that Surabhi – the mother of all cows and the "cow of plenty" – was the consort of Brahma and their union produced the eleven Rudras. Here they are named: Nirriti, Shambhu, Aparajita, Mrigavyadha, Kapardi, Dahana, Khara, Ahirabradhya, Kapali, Pingala and Senani. Brahma allotted to the Rudras the eleven positions of the heart and the five sensory organs, the five organs of action and the mind.

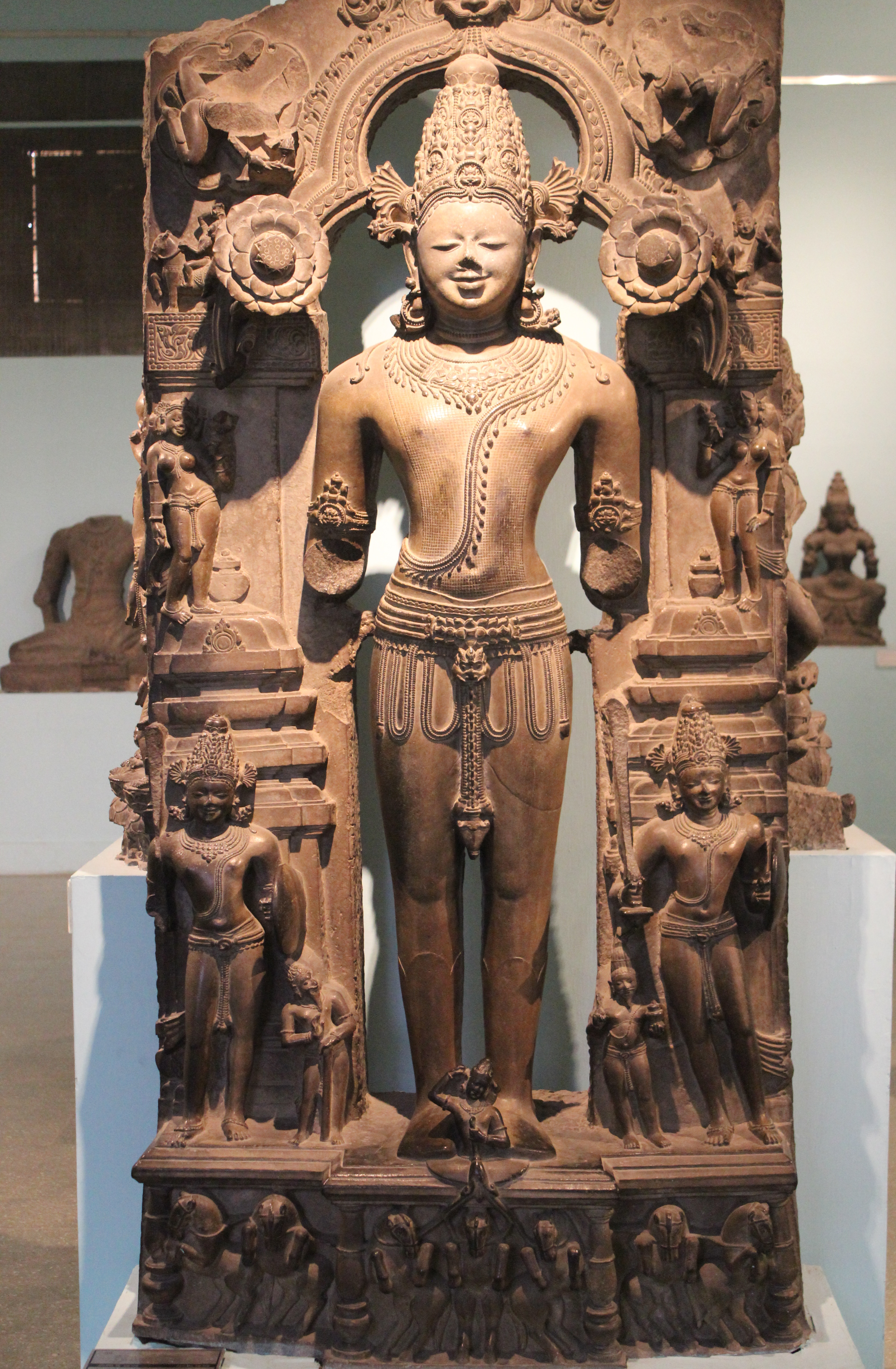
Statue of Surya

=== Vasus ===
The Vasus serve as the assistants of Indra and of Vishnu.

- Agni the "Fire" god, also called Anala or "living",
- Varuna the "Water" and "Ocean" god, also called Samudradeva or Apa,
- Vāyu the "Wind" and "Air" god, also called Anila ("wind"),
- Dyauṣ the "Sky" god, also called Dyaus Pita and Prabhāsa or the "shining dawn", also called akasha or sky,
- Pṛthivī the "Earth" goddess, also called Dharā or "support" and Bhumi or Earth,
- Sūrya the "Sun" god, also called Pratyūsha, ("break of dawn", but often used to mean simply "light"), the Saura sect worships Sūrya as their chief deity, also called Anshuman,
- Soma the "Moon" god, also called Chandra.
- Nakshatrani, also called Dhruva or motionless polestar (Polaris) and Prabhasa.

=== Ashvins ===
The Ashvins (also called the Nāsatyas) are the twin gods of medicine. Nasatya is also the name of one twin, while the other is called Dasra.

== See also ==
- The Upanishad's enumeration of the gods
- The Puranas' enumeration of the gods
- Folk deities of Sylhet
- Buddhism and Hinduism

== Sources ==
- Parikshitt, Sai (2012). 33 Koti Devata ~ The Concept Of 33 Koti Devata. Speaking Tree.: ' The Vedas refer to not 33 crore Devatas but 33 koti (Koti means types in Sanskrit) of Devatas. They are explained in Shatpath Brahman and many other scriptures very clearly. (In Sanskrit 33 koti means 33 types god's ) [...] .' The number 33 comes from the number of Vedic gods explained by Yajnavalkya in Brhadaranyaka Upanishad – the eight Vasus, the eleven Rudras, the twelve Adityas, Indra and Prajapati. (Chapter I, hymn 9, verse 2) . They are: 8-Vasu, 11-Rudra, and 12-Aaditya, 1-Indra and 1-Prajaapati.
- Brown, Joe David, ed. (1961). India. Time, Inc. "popular figure.": "Though the popular figure of 330 million is not the result of an actual count but intended to suggest infinity, the Hindu pantheon in fact contains literally hundreds of different deities [...]"
- Knott, Kim (1998). Hinduism: A Very Short Introduction. Oxford University Press.
- Nath, Vijay (2001). "From 'Brahmanism' to 'Hinduism': Negotiating the Myth of the Great Tradition". Social Scientist. 29 (3/4): 19–50. doi:10.2307/3518337. JSTOR 3518337.
