= Chatra Lok Sabha constituency =

Lok Sabha constituency in Jharkhand, India

Coordinates: 24.21°N 84.87°E

Chatra JH-4
- Lok Sabha constituency
- Interactive Map Outlining Chatra Lok Sabha constituency

Constituency details
- Country: India
- Region: East India
- State: Jharkhand
- Assembly constituencies: Simaria; Chatra; Manika; Latehar; Panki
- Established: 1957
- Reservation: None

Member of Parliament
- 18th Lok Sabha
- Incumbent Kalicharan Singh
- Party: BJP
- Alliance: NDA
- Elected year: 2024

Chatra Lok Sabha constituency is one of the 14 Lok Sabha (parliamentary) constituencies in Jharkhand state in eastern India. It covers the entire Chatra and Latehar districts and part of Palamu district.

== Assembly segments ==
Presently, Chatra Lok Sabha is the smallest constituency in Jharkhand and comprises the following five Vidhan Sabha (legislative assembly) segments:

Constituency number	Name	Reserved for (SC/ST/None)	District	Party	2024 Lead
26	Simaria	SC	Chatra	BJP	BJP
27	Chatra	SC	Chatra	LJP(RV)	BJP
73	Manika	ST	Latehar	INC	INC
74	Latehar	SC	Latehar	BJP	BJP
75	Panki	None	Palamu	BJP	BJP

Until 1977, Chatra was one of the vast Parliamentary constituencies with parts of Gaya, Hazaribag and Palamu districts. The districts of Chatra and Latehar came into being much later. Sans Panki, all the assembly segments (Chatra, Simaria, Latehar and Manika) are reserved seats, whereas Chatra continues to be an unreserved Parliamentary constituency.

== Members of Parliament ==
Year	Member	Party
1957	Vijaya Raje	Chota Nagpur Santhal Parganas Janata Party
1962	Vijaya Raje	Swatantra Party
1967	Vijaya Raje	Independent
1971	Shankar Dayal Singh	Indian National Congress
1977	Sukhdeo Prasad Verma	Janata Party
1980	Ranjit Singh	Indian National Congress (I)
1984	Yogeshwar Prasad Yogesh	Indian National Congress
1989	Upendra Nath Verma	Janata Dal
1991	Upendra Nath Verma	Janata Dal
1996	Dhirendra Agarwal	Bharatiya Janata Party
1998	Dhirendra Agarwal	Bharatiya Janata Party
1999	Nagmani	Rashtriya Janata Dal
2004	Dhirendra Agarwal	Rashtriya Janata Dal
2009	Inder Singh Namdhari	Independent
2014	Sunil Kumar Singh	Bharatiya Janata Party
2019	Sunil Kumar Singh	Bharatiya Janata Party
2024	Kalicharan Singh	Bharatiya Janata Party

== Election results ==
=== 2024 ===
2024 Indian general elections: Chatra
Party	Candidate	Votes	%	±%
BJP	Kalicharan Singh	574,556	52.89	
INC	Krishna Nand Tripathi	3,53,597	32.55	
NOTA	None of the above	8,511	0.78	
Majority				
Turnout		10,89,296	64.35	
BJP hold		Swing		

=== 2019 ===
2019 Indian general elections: Chatra
Party	Candidate	Votes	%	±%
BJP	Sunil Kumar Singh	528,077	57.03	
INC	Manoj Kumar Yadav	1,50,206	16.22	
RJD	Subhash Yadav	83,425	9.01	
CPI	Arjun Kumar	22,577	2.44	
BSP	Nageshwar Ganjhu	18,888	2.04	
Majority		3,77,871	40.81	
Turnout		9,25,956	64.97	
BJP hold		Swing		

=== 2014 ===
2014 Indian general elections: Chatra
Party	Candidate	Votes	%	±%
BJP	Sunil Kumar Singh	2,95,862	41.50	
INC	Dhiraj Prasad Sahu	1,17,836	16.53	
JVM(P)	Nilam Devi	1,04,176	14.61	
AJSU	Nagmani	35,674	5.00	
Majority		1,78,026	24.97	
Turnout		7,12,980	54.32	
BJP gain from Independent		Swing		

=== 2009 ===
2009 Indian general elections: Chatra
Party	Candidate	Votes	%	±%
Independent	Inder Singh Namdhari	1,08,336	22.86	
INC	Dhiraj Prasad Sahu	92,158	19.44	
RJD	Nagmani Kushwaha	68,764	14.51	
Communist Party of India (Marxist-Leninist)	Keshwar Yadav	63,846	13.47	
JD(U)	Arun Kumar Yadav	46,088	9.72	
Majority		16,178	3.41	
Turnout		4,73,941	45.67	
Independent gain from RJD		Swing		

=== 1984 Lok Sabha ===
- Yogeshwar Prasad Yogesh (INC) : 211,020 votes
- Shukdeo Prasad Verma (ICJ) : 54,478

== See also ==
- List of constituencies of the Lok Sabha
