= Harikrishna Singh =

Indian politician

Member of Jharkhand Legislative Assembly Manika
- In office 2014–2019
- In office 2009–2014
- Preceded by: Ramchandra Singh

Personal details
- Party: Bharatiya Janata Party
- Occupation: Politician, Agriculture
- As of 11 November, 2019

Harikrishna Singh is an Indian politician from the Bharatiya Janata Party. He is the state legislative assembly member from Manika since 2009.
