= Sunil Kumar Singh (Jharkhand politician) =

Indian politician

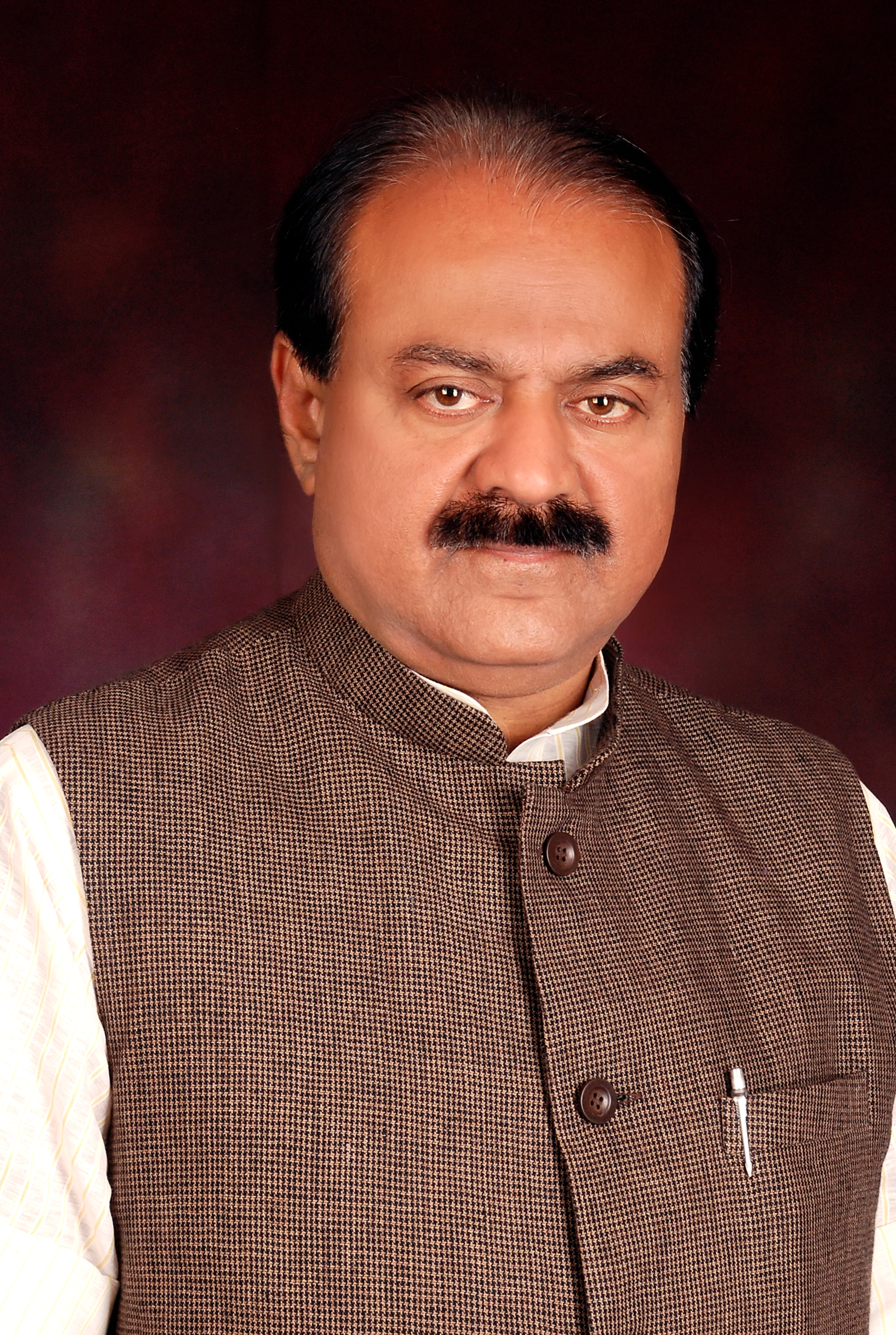

Member of Parliament, Lok Sabha
- In office 16 May 2014 – 4 June 2024
- Preceded by: Inder Singh Namdhari
- Succeeded by: Kalicharan Singh
- Constituency: Chatra

Personal details
- Born: 10 January 1962 (age 64) Patna, Bihar, India
- Party: Bharatiya Janata Party
- Spouse: Mrs. Pratima Singh
- Children: 2
- Parent: Late Shri K N Singh
- Occupation: Businessperson
- Website: www.sunilkumarsingh.com

Sunil Kumar Singh (born 10 January 1962; Hindi pronunciation: [sʊn̪iːl kʊmaːr sɪŋgʱ]) is an Indian politician and a member of parliament from Chatra Parliamentary Constituency, Jharkhand. He won the 2014 Indian general election being a Bharatiya Janata Party candidate. He again won from the same Chatra in the 2019 Lok Sabha elections.

== Early life and family ==
Sunil Kumar Singh born on 10 January 1962 in Bihar to Kedar Nath Singh and Nirmala Devi. He married Mrs. Paratima Singh.

== Career ==
Positions Held May, 2014 Elected to 16th Lok Sabha member of parliament from Chatra (Lok Sabha constituency), Jharkhand as Bharatiya Janata Party Whip BJP, Won the Seat ensuring all candidates against him lost their deposits. Member, Committee on Government Assurances, Member, Standing Committee on Coal and Steel, Member, Consultative Committee, Ministry of External Affairs and Overseas Indian Affairs, Member, Joint Committee on Bill to Amend the Citizenship Act, 1955 Member, Consultative Committee, Ministry of Skill Development and Entrepreneurship 2017-2019 President, India-Republic of Korea Parliamentary Friendship Group May, 2019 Re-elected to 17th Lok Sabha (2nd term) member of parliament from Chatra (Lok Sabha constituency), Jharkhand as Bharatiya Janata Party. Lok Sabha Won the Seat for a second time in a row by ensuring all candidates against him lost their deposits. Whip, Bharatiya Janata Party, Member, Business Advisory Committee in Lok Sabha Member, Standing Committee on Coal and Steel 09 Oct. 2019 onwards Chairperson, Committee of Privileges in Lok Sabha

Special Interests Indian Culture and Traditions; Working through voluntary organisations to make Damodar, Subarnrekha and other rivers in Jharkhand pollution free

Countries Visited Mauritius and U.S.A. Visited Mauritius as a Representative of India to participate in the deliberations of the Council for International Cooperation in 1995; Attended International Visitor Leadership Programme (IVLP) in 2007 on the invitation of Government of USA

Germany, Climate Parliament, 2017; Cyprus, Bulgaria, Czech Republic with Hon`able President of India, 2 Sept. - 9 Sept. 2018
