= Sabha Parva =

Second book of the Mahabharata

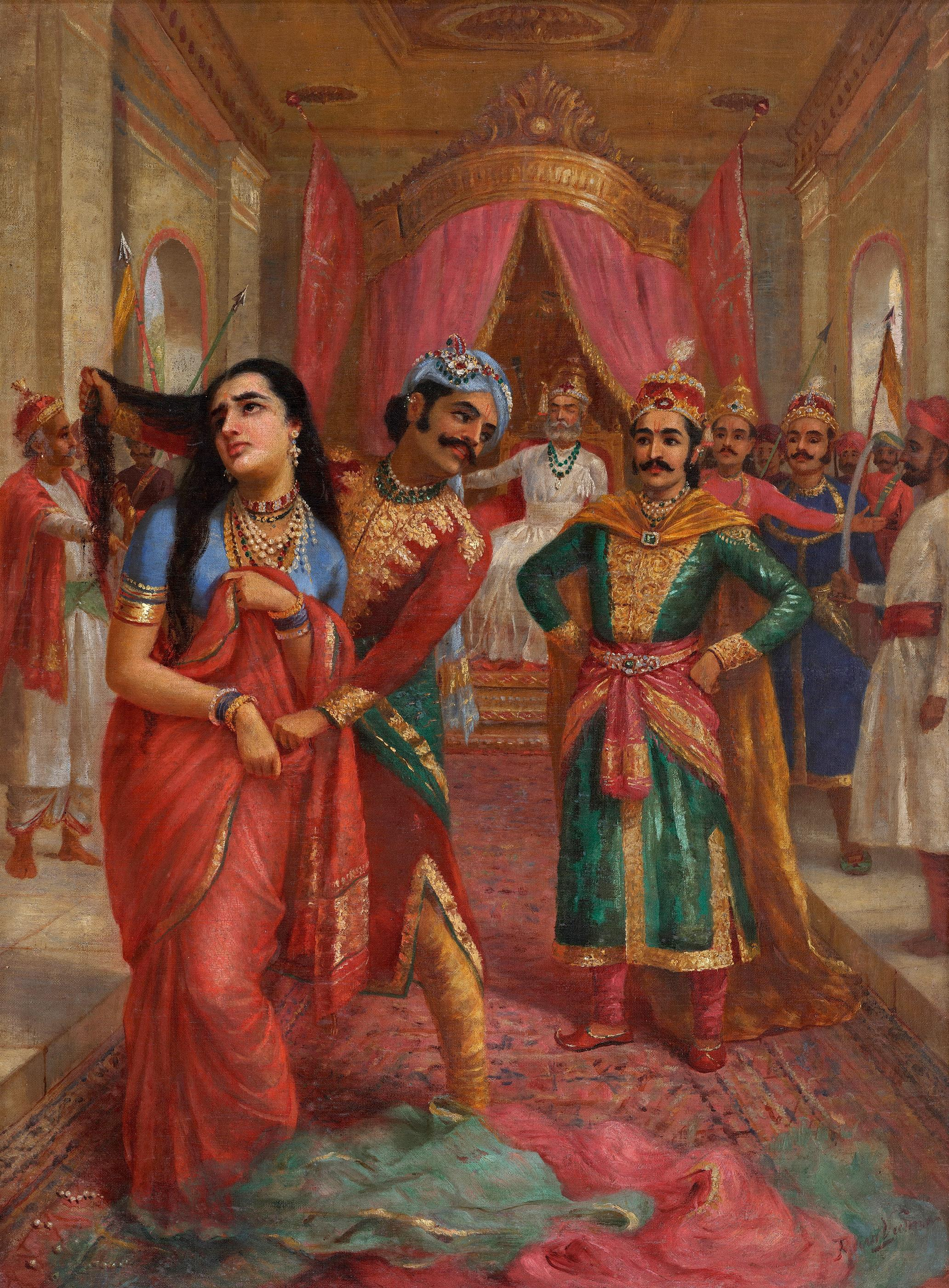
Dushasana attempts to disrobe Draupadi in the court of Hastinapura, a scene from the Sabha Parva by Raja Ravi Varma

The Sabha Parva ("Book of the Assembly Hall") is the second of the eighteen parvas (books) of the Indian epic Mahabharata. Sabha Parva traditionally has 10 parts and 81 chapters. The critical edition of Sabha Parva has 9 parts and 72 chapters.

Sabha Parva starts with the description of the palace and assembly hall (sabha) built by Maya, at Indraprastha. Chapter 5 of the book outlines over a hundred principles of governance and administration necessary for a kingdom and its citizens to be prosperous, virtuous and happy. The middle parts describe life at the court, Yudhishthira's Rajasuya Yajna that leads to the expansion of the Pandava brothers' empire. The last two parts describe the one vice and addiction of the virtuous king Yudhishthira – gambling. Shakuni, encouraged by Duryodhana, mocks Yudhishthira and tempts him into a game of dice. Yudhishthira bets everything and loses the game, leading to the eventual exile of the Pandavas.

The book also details the principle of evil and crime against humanity, of why individuals who themselves have not been harmed must act regardless when society at large suffers systematic crime and injustice – this theory is outlined in the story of Magadha, Chapters 20 through 24, where the trio of Krishna, Arjuna and Bhima slay Jarasandha.

== Structure and chapters ==
The Sabha Parva has 10 upa-parvas (parts, little books), and a total of 81 adhyayas (chapters).

=== Sabhakriya Parva (chapters: 1–4) ===
The first parva of second book describes the construction of palace for Yudhishthira and his brothers, then the finished palace. Sages and kings are invited to celebrate the completion of palace.

=== Lokapala Sabhakhayana Parva (chapters: 5–13) ===
Sage Narada arrives at the palace for celebrations. The sage rhetorically explains the theory of state craft for kings, how to find the most able people and make them ministers, how to train and take care of military, watch over enemies, rules of espionage, rules of war, support families of veterans who die or get injured at war, the support of farmers and merchants, care for poor and distressed in their empire, policies on tax, create incentive for Artha and prosperity, free trade, reward merit, pursue and punish criminal activities, deliver justice equally and without favor. Narada proclaims it is the duty of the king to serve the cause of Dharma, Artha and Kama in his kingdom. This theory of administration and governance of a kingdom in Sabha Parva, summarizes the detailed discussions in the Indian classic Arthashastra, claim scholars. The other Indian epic, Ramayana, has a similar kachchida summary chapter on fair administration and the rule of law. Yudhishthira promises to follow Narada's advice. Narada describes the design, architecture and assembly halls of Yama, Varuna, Indra, Kubera and Brahma. Narada asks Yudhishthira to perform Rajasuya.

=== Rajasuyarambha Parva (chapters: 14–19) ===
Krishna explains why Jarasandha – the king of Magadha – should be killed, why human sacrifices by Jarasandha must be stopped, Jarasandha's prisoners freed. This would also help complete Rajasuya, he counsels Yudhishthira. Krishna is asked why Jarasandha is powerful as well as evil. He explains with the story of Vrihatratha (lord of the earth) and demoness Jara, how Jarasandha was named after the demoness.

=== Jarasandha-vadha Parva (chapters: 20–24) ===
Krishna, Arjuna and Bhima arrive at Magadha, a prosperous kingdom inherited and ruled by Jarasandha. Krishna describes how King Goutama married Ushinara – a Sudra woman – and they had famous sons. They visit Jarasandha, who demands to know why he is being considered an enemy of Krishna, Arjuna and Bhima, when he has done nothing wrong to any of them personally. Krishna explains that persecution of men is cruelty to virtuous life, and human sacrifice is a crime against humanity. Such a crime is sin that touches every one, including Bhima, Arjuna and him. Jarasandha's sin is injustice that must be challenged. They invite him to either release all the prisoners scheduled for human sacrifice or accept a battle to death. Jarasandha chooses war, picks Bhima as the adversary. Krishna counsels Bhima on principles of just war theory, a theory that appears in more detail in other books of Mahabharata. Bhima kills Jarasandha. The prisoners targeted for human sacrifices are freed.

=== Digvijaya Parva (chapters: 25–31) ===
Pandava brothers expand their empire. Arjuna conquers the north, Bhima the east, Sahadeva the south, and Nakula wins the west. Yudhishthira is declared Dharmaraja. Digvijaya Parva describes the geography, tribes and various kingdoms as these brothers go in different directions to expand their empire. For example, Arjuna encounters the kingdom of Hataka, a land inhabited by guhyakas, while Bhima arrives in Tamralipta.

=== Rajasuyika Parva (chapters: 32–34) ===
Krishna visits Yudhishthira with presents. The Pandava brothers prepare for Rajasuya ceremony.

=== Arghyaharana Parva (chapters: 35–38) ===
Kings, sages and visitors from around the world arrive for Rajasuya ceremony. Sahadeva offers Arghya – an offering with worship – to Krishna. Shishupala objects. Kings take sides. Hostilities begin. Shishupala leaves with some kings following him. Yudhishthira attempts reconciliation and peace talks.

=== Shishupala-vadha Parva (chapters: 39–44) ===
The sub-parva describes how and why Krishna first refuses to fight Shishupala, but finally kills him in the assembly hall during the Rajasuya yagna. Krishna leaves.

=== Dyuta Parva (chapters: 45–73) ===
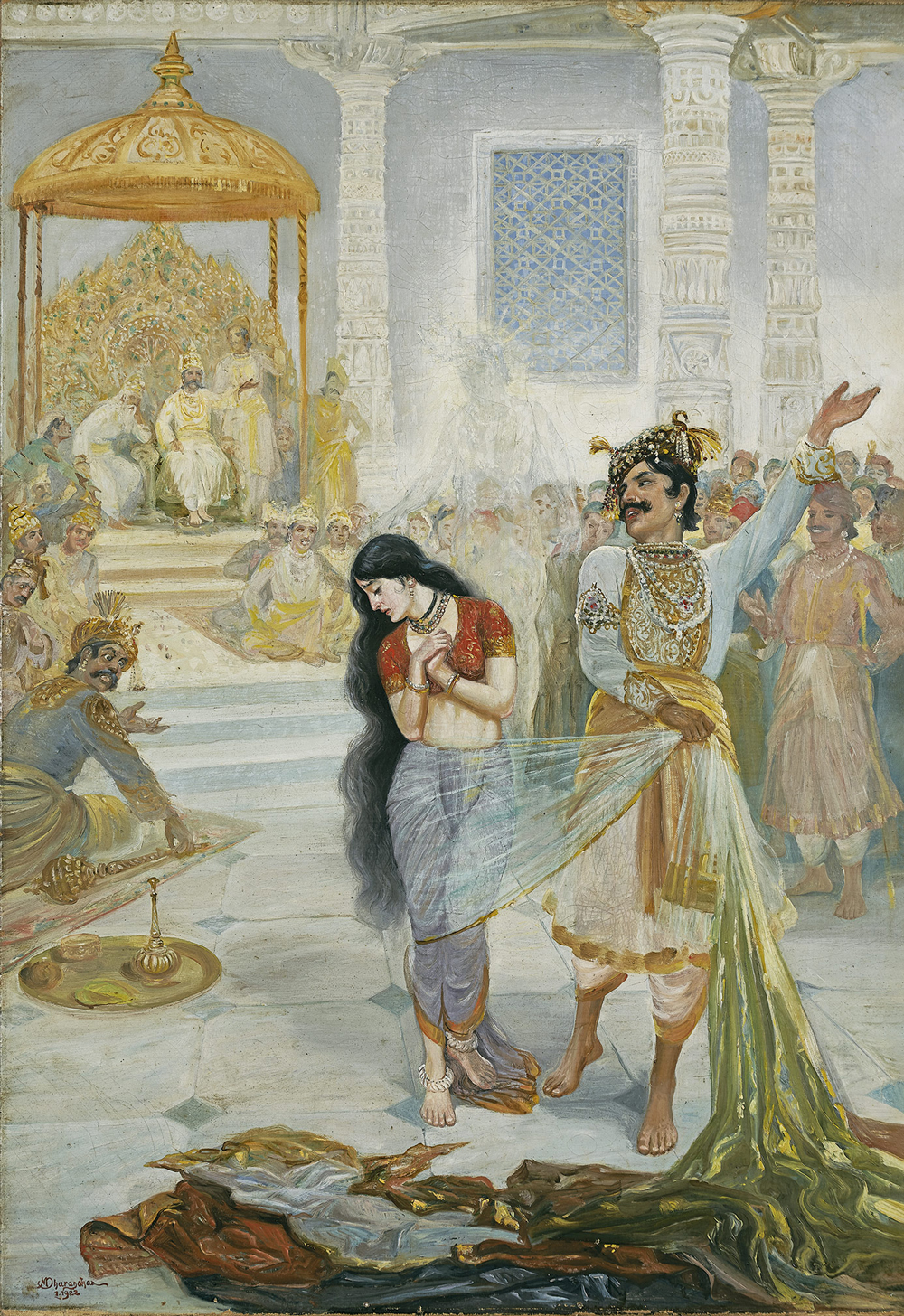
Divine intervention of Krishna saving Draupadi, painting by M V Dhurandhar, c. 1922

Shakuni, the maternal uncle of Duryodhana, advises him that Pandava brothers cannot be defeated in a battle or by virtuous means; the only way to vanquish them is to exploit the weakness of Yudhishthira, his fondness for gambling. Duryodhana asks Dhritarashtra to exploit Yudhishthira's weakness over the game of dice. They ask Shakuni to tempt and defeat Yudhishthira. Shakuni provokes Yudhishthira for the game of dice. Yudhishthira shows reluctance to gambling. Shakuni mocks him. Yudhishthira accepts the provocation, bets his kingdom, his brothers, himself, and finally his wife in the 20th round of the game of dice; Shakuni wins everything. Draupadi is humiliated in the Assembly Hall by disrobing; her virtue leads gods to protect her in a skirt. Upset Draupadi questions the game, argues that she is not owned by Yudhishthira, the 20th round was flawed because it wrongfully treated her as property. Everyone in the Assembly Hall, including Yudhishthira and Dhritarashtra agree. The entire gambling game is declared invalid, Yudhishthira recovers everything he had lost.

=== Anudyuta Parva (chapters: 74–81) ===
Yudhishthira is invited back again for the game of dice, Yudhishthira succumbs, and they play for one stake. Dhritarashtra bets kingdom of Hastinapur and Yudhishthira bets kingdom of Indraprastha. They agree that the loser will go into exile for 12 years and the 13th year, unrecognized in some inhabited place, and if they are recognized in the 13th year they are found then they would go into exile for another 12 years. Yudhishthira loses the game of dice again. The Pandava brothers move into exile. Dhritarashtra comes to power. Sages counsel him to make peace with Pandavas, seek a solution that unites the two sides. Dhritarashtra refuses. Scholars have questioned why Yudhishthira the Dharmaraja, who had it all, and was praised for enabling an empire infused with Dharma, Artha and Kama, who was so consistently ethical and moral until the last two Parvas, succumbs so suddenly to gambling.

== English translations ==
Several translations of the Sanskrit book Sabha Parva in English are available. Two translations from 19th century, now in public domain, are those by Kisari Mohan Ganguli and Manmatha Nath Dutt. The translations are not consistent in parts, and vary with each translator's interpretations. For example:

Chapter 5, Verses 2–9 from Sabha Parva in Sanskrit:

लॊकान अनुचरन सर्वान आगमत तां सभाम ऋषिः
नारदः सुमहातेजा ऋषिभिः सहितस तदा
पारिजातेन राजेन्द्र रैवतेन च धीमता
सुमुखेन च सौम्येन देवर्षिर अमितद्युतिः
सभास्थान पाण्डवान दरष्टुं परीयमाणॊ मनॊजवः
तम आगतम ऋषिं दृष्ट्वा नारदं सर्वधर्मवित
सहसा पाण्डवश्रेष्ठः परत्युत्थायानुजैः सह
अभ्यवादयत परीत्या विनयावनतस तदा
तद अर्हम आसनं तस्मै संप्रदाय यथाविधि
अर्चयाम आस रत्नैश च सर्वकामैश च धर्मवित
सॊ ऽरचितः पाण्डवैः सर्वैर महर्षिर वेदपारगः
धर्मकामार्थ संयुक्तं पप्रच्छेदं युधिष्ठिरम
[न] कच चिद अर्थाश च कल्पन्ते धर्मे च रमते मनः
सुखानि चानुभूयन्ते मनश च न विहन्यते
कच चिद आचरितां पूर्वैर नरदेव पिता महैः
वर्तसे वृत्तिम अक्षीणां धर्मार्थसहितां नृषु
कच चिद अर्थेन वा धर्मं धर्मेणार्थम अथापि वा
उभौ वा परीतिसारेण न कामेन परबाधसे

— Lokapala Sabhakhayana Parva, Sabha Parva, Mahabharata Book ii.5, Vyasa

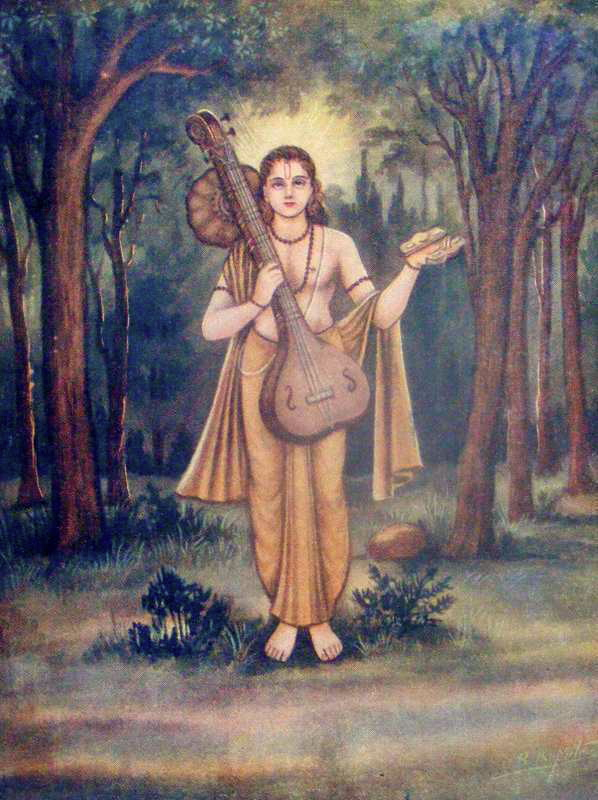
Sage Narada visit to the Pandava brothers is described in Chapter 5 of Sabha Parva. On his visit, he outlines the theory of administration and governance, rules of treaties peace and war, champions free trade and a check on ministers, support for distressed people and disabled citizens, the need for fair laws and equal justice for all without favor in a prosperous empire. Narada (pictured above) is considered as the inventor of musical instrument Vina; in Mahabharata, he is depicted as a highly talented scholar dedicated to arts, history and knowledge.

Translation by Manmatha Nath Dutt:

There came Narada,
The celestial Rishi who was learned in the Vedas and the Upanishadas, who was worshipped by the celestials,
who was learned in the histories and the Puranas, who was well-versed in all that had happened in old Kalpas,
who was well skilled in Nyaya (logic), and in the truths of moral science,
who was the possessor of the complete knowledge of the Angas, and a perfect master of reconciling contradictory texts,
who was eloquent, resolute, intelligent, learned, possessor of powerful memory,
learned in the science of morality and politics, proficient in distinguishing inferior things from the superior,
skilled in drawing inferences from evidence, competent to judge of correctness or incorrectness of syllogistic statements consisting of five propositions,
capable of answering successfully (the queries) of Vrihaspati,
who was a man with definite conclusions properly framed about Dharma, Artha, Kama and Moksha (salvation),
who was a man with a great soul seeing the universe above, below, and around as if it were present before his eyes,
who was a master of Samkhya and Yoga (Philosophies), and
who was ever desirous of humbling the Devas and the Asuras by fomenting quarrels amongst them,
who was learned in the science of war and treaty, proficient in making dispositions of things by guesses,
the teacher of six sciences (of treaty, war, march, defending military posts, stratagem by ambuscade, and of reserves) and learned in all the Shastras.
who was fond of war and music, and incapable of being repulsed by any science or learning.
possessed of these and many other accomplishments, the greatly effulgent Rishi Narada with many other Rishis,
after having travelled over all the world, came (at last) to the assembly hall.

— Lokapala Sabhakhayana Parva, Translated by Manmatha Nath Dutt, Sabha Parva, Mahabharata Book ii.5, Vyasa

Translation by Kisari Mohan Ganguli:

There came, O Bharata, unto that assembly the celestial Rishi Narada, conversant with the Vedas and Upanishadas, worshipped by the celestials acquainted with histories and Puranas, well-versed in all that occurred in ancient kalpas (cycles), conversant with Nyaya (logic) and the truth of moral science, possessing a complete knowledge of the six Angas (viz., pronunciation, grammar, prosody, explanation of basic terms, description of religious rites, and astronomy). He was a perfect master in reconciling contradictory texts and differentiating in applying general principles to particular cases, as also in interpreting contraries by reference to differences in situation, eloquent, resolute, intelligent, possessed of powerful memory. He was acquainted with the science of morals and politics, learned, proficient in distinguishing inferior things from superior ones, skilled in drawing inference from evidence, competent to judge of the correctness or incorrectness of syllogistic statements consisting of five propositions. He was capable of answering successively Vrihaspati himself while arguing, with definite conclusions properly framed about religion, wealth, pleasure and salvation, of great soul and beholding this whole universe, above, below, and around, as if it were present before his eyes. He was master of both the Samkhya and Yoga systems of philosophy, ever desirous of humbling the celestials and Asuras by fomenting quarrels among them, conversant with the sciences of war and treaty, proficient in drawing conclusions by judging of things not within direct ken, as also in the six sciences of treaty, war, military campaigns, maintenance of posts against the enemy and stratagems by ambuscades and reserves. He was a thorough master of every branch of learning, fond of war and music, incapable of being repulsed by any science or any course, of action, and possessed of these and numberless other accomplishments. The Rishi, having wandered over the different worlds, came into that Sabha.

— Lokapala Sabhakhayana Parva, Translated by Kisari Mohan Ganguli, Vyasa, Sabha Parva, Mahabharata Book ii.5

The total number of original verses depend on which Sanskrit source is used, and these do not equal the total number of translated verses in each chapter, in both Ganguli and Dutt translations. Mahabharata, like many ancient Sanskrit texts, was transmitted across generations verbally, a practice that was a source of corruption of its text, deletion of verses, as well as the addition of extraneous verses over time. The structure, prose, meter and style of translations vary within chapters between the translating authors.

Clay Sanskrit Library has published a 15 volume set of the Mahabharata which includes a translation of Sabha Parva by Paul Wilmot. This translation is modern and uses an old manuscript of the Epic. The translation does not remove verses and chapters now widely believed to be spurious and smuggled into the Epic in 1st or 2nd millennium AD.

J. A. B. van Buitenen published an annotated edition of Sabha Parva, reflecting the verses common in multiple versions of the Mahabharata. Buitenen suggests Sabha Parva had less corruption, deletion and addition of extraneous verses over time than Adi Parva. Debroy, in his 2011 overview of Mahabharata, notes that updated critical edition of Sabha Parva, with spurious and corrupted text removed, has 9 parts, 72 adhyayas {{nobold|(chapters) and 2,387 shlokas (verses). Debroy's translation of the critical edition of Sabha Parva appears in Volume 2 of his series. Sabha Parva is considered one of pivotable books among the eighteen books, the gambling and exile episode is often dramatized in modern productions of the Mahabharata.

The entire parva has been "transcreated" and translated in verse by the poet Dr. Purushottama Lal published by Writers Workshop.

== Quotations and teachings ==
Lokapala Sabhakhyana Parva, Chapter 5:

Narada said:
Is the wealth you are earning spent in proper objects? Does your mind take pleasure in virtue?
Are you enjoying the pleasures of life? Does not your mind sink under their weight?
O chief of men, do you continue in the noble conduct consistent with Dharma and Artha,
with respect to the three classes (good, bad and indifferent) of your subjects as practised by your ancestors?
Do you injure religion (Dharma) for the sake of profit (Artha), or profit for the sake of religion,
or both religion and profit for the sake of pleasure which easily tempts men ?

— Lokapala Sabhakhyana Parva, Sabha Parva, Mahabharata Book ii.5, Vyasa

Rajasuya Arambha Parva, Chapter 15:

Men of immature understanding begin an act without having an eye to what may happen in future.

— Rajasuya Arambha Parva, Vyasa, Sabha Parva, Mahabharata Book ii.15

Jarasandha Vadha Parva, Chapter 22:

Whatever actions are performed by a man under whatever circumstances, he gets the fruits of those actions under whatever circumstances they may be performed. We are desirous of helping all distressed people.

— Krishna, Jarasandha Vadha Parva, Vyasa, Sabha Parva, Mahabharata Book ii.22

Rajsuyika Parva, Chapter 33:

Protected by Dharmaraja and supported by Truth, all their enemies kept in check,
all subjects of the Pandava king were always engaged in their respective businesses.
In consequence of equitable taxation and the virtuous and just rule of the king,
the clouds poured as much rain as desired, and the country became prosperous.

— Rajasuyika Parva, Sabha Parva, Mahabharata Book ii.33, Vyasa

== See also ==
- Previous book of Mahabharata: Adi Parva
- Next book of Mahabharata: Vana Parva
