= Daltonganj Assembly constituency =

Assembly constituency in the Indian state of Jharkhand

Coordinates: 24.047°N 84.080°E

Daltonganj
- Constituency No. 76 for the Jharkhand Legislative Assembly

Constituency details
- Country: India
- Region: East India
- State: Jharkhand
- District: Palamu
- Lok Sabha constituency: Palamu
- Established: 2000
- Total electors: 346,781
- Reservation: None

Member of Legislative Assembly
- 5th Jharkhand Legislative Assembly
- Incumbent Alok Kumar Chaurasiya
- Party: Bhartiya Janta Party
- Elected year: 2024

Daltonganj is an assembly constituency in the Indian state of Jharkhand.

== Members of the Legislative Assembly ==
Election	Name	Party
Bihar Legislative Assembly
1952	Amiya Kumar Ghosh	Indian National Congress
1957	Umeshwari Charan	Praja Socialist Party
1962	Sachidanand Tripathy	Swatantra Party
1967	Puran Chand	Sanghata Socialist Party
1969	Puran Chand	Samyukta Socialist Party
1972	Puran Chand	Socialist Party
1977	Puran Chand	Janata Party
1980	Inder Singh Namdhari	Bharatiya Janata Party
1985	Ishwar Chandra Pandey	Indian National Congress
1990	Inder Singh Namdhari	Bharatiya Janata Party
1995	Inder Singh Namdhari	Janata Dal
2000	Inder Singh Namdhari	Janata Dal (United)
Jharkhand Legislative Assembly
2005	Inder Singh Namdhari	Janata Dal (United)
2009	Krishna Nand Tripathi	Indian National Congress
2014	Alok Kumar Chaurasiya	Jharkhand Vikas Morcha (Note: Six JVM(P) MLAs joined BJP in 2015)
2019	Alok Kumar Chaurasiya	Bharatiya Janata Party
2024	Alok Kumar Chaurasiya	Bharatiya Janata Party

== Election results ==
=== Assembly election 2024 ===
2024 Jharkhand Legislative Assembly election: Daltonganj
Party	Candidate	Votes	%	±%
BJP	Alok Kumar Chaurasiya	102,175	38.43	▼9.14
INC	Krishna Nand Tripathi	1,01,285	38.10	▲0.40
Independent	Dilip Singh Namdhari	21,232	7.99	New
ASP(KR)	Ajay Kumar Singh	13,549	5.10	New
CPI	Ruchir Kumar Tiwari	4,841	1.82	New
Independent	Chanardhan Singh	3,159	1.19	New
JLKM	Aniket	2,429	0.91	New
NOTA	None of the Above	1,214	0.46	▼1.77
Margin of victory		890	0.33	▼9.54
Turnout		2,65,856	66.03	▲3.17
Registered electors		4,02,626		▲16.10
BJP hold		Swing	▼9.14	

=== Assembly election 2019 ===
2019 Jharkhand Legislative Assembly election: Daltonganj
Party	Candidate	Votes	%	±%
BJP	Alok Kumar Chaurasiya	103,698	47.57	▲26.14
INC	Krishna Nand Tripathi	82,181	37.70	▲10.10
JVM(P)	Rahul Agrawal	12,061	5.53	▼24.25
Independent	Sanjay Kumar Singh	3,863	1.77	New
Independent	Santosh Kumar Sharma	2,979	1.37	New
BSP	Jagannath Prasad Singh	2,661	1.22	New
NCP	Vijeta Verma	1,208	0.55	New
NOTA	None of the Above	4,850	2.22	▲1.53
Margin of victory		21,517	9.87	▲7.68
Turnout		2,17,999	62.86	▼1.84
Registered electors		3,46,781		▲12.87
BJP gain from JVM(P)		Swing	▲17.79	

=== Assembly election 2014 ===
2014 Jharkhand Legislative Assembly election: Daltonganj
Party	Candidate	Votes	%	±%
JVM(P)	Alok Kumar Chaurasiya	59,202	29.78	New
INC	Krishna Nand Tripathi	54,855	27.59	▼2.00
BJP	Manoj Kumar Singh	42,597	21.43	▼5.29
Independent	Dilip Singh Namdhari	18,892	9.50	New
Independent	Azimuddin Miyan	3,104	1.56	New
Independent	Amlesh Prasad	2,031	1.02	New
Bharatiya Suraaj Dal	P. K. Siddharth	1,659	0.83	New
NOTA	None of the Above	1,378	0.69	New
Margin of victory		4,347	2.19	▼0.69
Turnout		1,98,790	64.70	▲9.75
Registered electors		3,07,237		▲14.68
JVM(P) gain from INC		Swing	▲0.18	

=== Assembly election 2009 ===
2009 Jharkhand Legislative Assembly election: Daltonganj
Party	Candidate	Votes	%	±%
INC	Krishna Nand Tripathi	43,571	29.60	▲18.78
BJP	Dilip Singh Namdhari	39,338	26.72	New
BSP	Anil Kumar Chaurasiya	37,380	25.39	New
RJD	Gyan Chand Pandey	5,180	3.52	▼11.86
JMM	Satish Kumar	4,444	3.02	New
AJSU	Sazid Ahmad Si.	3,872	2.63	New
Independent	Fuli Singh	2,510	1.71	New
Margin of victory		4,233	2.88	▲0.36
Turnout		1,47,212	54.95	▼5.01
Registered electors		2,67,909		▲7.63
INC gain from JD(U)		Swing	▼0.81	

=== Assembly election 2005 ===
2005 Jharkhand Legislative Assembly election: Daltonganj
Party	Candidate	Votes	%	±%
JD(U)	Inder Singh Namdhari	45,386	30.41	▼10.02
Independent	Anil Kumar Chaurasiya	41,625	27.89	New
RJD	Gyan Chand Pandey	22,954	15.38	▼9.60
INC	Krishna Nand Tripathi	16,147	10.82	▼4.97
CPI	Shailendra Kumar	2,018	1.35	▼2.03
Independent	Shakhi Gopal Prasad	1,942	1.30	New
SAP	Phuli Singh	1,930	1.29	New
Margin of victory		3,761	2.52	▼12.93
Turnout		1,49,251	59.96	▲11.08
Registered electors		2,48,912		▲20.93
JD(U) hold		Swing	▼10.02	

=== Assembly election 2000 ===
2000 Bihar Legislative Assembly election: Daltonganj
Party	Candidate	Votes	%	±%
JD(U)	Inder Singh Namdhari	40,675	40.42	New
RJD	Anil Kumar Chaurasiya	25,132	24.98	New
INC	Chandra Shekhar Shukla	15,884	15.79	New
JMM	Sanjeev Kumar Tiwary	4,310	4.28	New
SJP(R)	Shatrughan Ojha	4,092	4.07	New
CPI	Shalendra Kumar	3,404	3.38	New
Independent	Puranchand	2,539	2.52	New
Margin of victory		15,543	15.45	
Turnout		1,00,620	49.71	
Registered electors		2,05,829		
JD(U) win (new seat)				

== See also ==
- Vidhan Sabha
- List of states of India by type of legislature
