= Ramchandra Singh =

Indian politician

MLA of Jharkhand Legislative Assembly for Manika
- Incumbent
- Assumed office 2019
- Preceded by: Harikrishna Singh
- Constituency: Manika
- In office 2005–2009
- Succeeded by: Harikrishna Singh
- Constituency: Manika

Personal details
- Party: Indian National Congress
- Parent: Ganpat Singh (Father)
- Occupation: MLA, Politician, Agriculture

Ramchandra Singh is an Indian politician from the Indian National Congress. He is the state legislative assembly member from Manika 2019.
