= Baidyanath Ram =

Indian politician

Member of Parliament, Rajya Sabha
- Incumbent
- Assumed office 22 June 2026
- Preceded by: Shibu Soren (died on 4 August 2025)
- Constituency: Jharkhand

Member of Jharkhand Legislative Assembly
- In office 2019–2024
- Preceded by: Prakash Ram
- Succeeded by: Prakash Ram
- Constituency: Latehar
- In office 2009–2014
- Preceded by: Prakash Ram
- Succeeded by: Prakash Ram
- Constituency: Latehar
- In office 2000–2005
- Preceded by: Baljeet Ram
- Succeeded by: Prakash Ram
- Constituency: Latehar

Personal details
- Party: Jharkhand Mukti Morcha
- Other political affiliations: Bharatiya Janata Party; Janata Dal (United)

Baidyanath Ram is an Indian politician from Jharkhand. He is a member of Jharkhand Mukti Morcha and currently serving as Member of Parliament, Rajya Sabha from Jharkhand since 22 June 2026.

he was member of the Bharatiya Janata Party. Ram was a member of the Jharkhand Legislative Assembly from the Latehar constituency in Latehar district. On 10 November 2019, he joined Jharkhand Mukti Morcha Party due to his name removed by BJP for 2019 Jharkhand Vidhan Sabha Election Candidate.

== Electoral performance ==
2024 Jharkhand Legislative Assembly election: Latehar
Party	Candidate	Votes	%	±%
BJP	Prakash Ram	98,062	44.74	▲11.66
JMM	Baidyanath Ram	97,628	44.54	▲2.49
JLKM	Santosh Kumar Paswan	4,295	1.96	New
Independent	Rakesh Paswan	3,745	1.71	New
BSP	Prakash Kumar Ravi	2,678	1.22	▼0.51
Independent	Shrawan Paswan	2,426	1.11	New
API	Brahamdev Ram	2,386	1.09	New
NOTA	None of the Above	4,518	2.06	▼0.96
Margin of victory		434	0.20	▼8.78
Turnout		2,19,204	71.12	▲3.68
Registered electors		3,08,236		▲14.23
BJP gain from JMM		Swing	▲2.69	

2019 Jharkhand Legislative Assembly election: Latehar
Party	Candidate	Votes	%	±%
JMM	Baidyanath Ram	76,507	42.04	▲27.67
BJP	Prakash Ram	60,179	33.07	▲5.35
Independent	Santosh Kumar Paswan	15,985	8.78	New
JVM(P)	Aman Kumar Bhogta	8,700	4.78	▼39.66
Independent	Sanjay Kumar	4,278	2.35	New
BSP	Ramesh Ganjhu	3,143	1.73	▼0.65
Independent	Virendra Paswan	1,827	1.00	New
NOTA	None of the Above	5,503	3.02	▲0.36
Margin of victory		16,328	8.97	▼7.75
Turnout		1,81,967	67.44	▲1.27
Registered electors		2,69,835		▲11.47
JMM gain from JVM(P)		Swing	▼2.40	

2009 Jharkhand Legislative Assembly election: Latehar
Party	Candidate	Votes	%	±%
BJP	Baidyanath Ram	34,522	32.86	New
RJD	Prakash Ram	34,084	32.44	▲18.69
JMM	Ramdeo Ganjhu	10,076	9.59	▼0.22
INC	Suresh Ram	7,865	7.49	New
Independent	Ramnath Ganjhu	5,999	5.71	New
Independent	Ram Ratan Baspati	3,731	3.55	New
BSP	Yugal Kishor Ram	3,189	3.04	▲1.83
Margin of victory		438	0.42	▼3.53
Turnout		1,05,054	61.21	▲4.00
Registered electors		1,71,628		▼28.24
BJP gain from RJD		Swing	▲19.11	

2005 Jharkhand Legislative Assembly election: Latehar
Party	Candidate	Votes	%	±%
RJD	Prakash Ram	18,819	13.75	▼6.24
JMM	Ramdev Ganjhu	13,421	9.81	▼6.94
JD(U)	Baidyanath Ram	13,040	9.53	▼21.65
Independent	Phulchand Ganjhu	9,411	6.88	New
Independent	Shyam Ram	3,441	2.51	New
Independent	Ram Sevak Baitha	3,215	2.35	New
BSP	Bigu Mochi	1,643	1.20	New
Margin of victory		5,398	3.95	▼7.24
Turnout		1,36,824	57.21	▲40.54
Registered electors		2,39,166		▲60.68
RJD gain from JD(U)		Swing	▼17.42	

2000 Bihar Legislative Assembly election: Latehar
Party	Candidate	Votes	%	±%
JD(U)	Baidyanath Ram	7,734	31.18	New
RJD	Prakash Ram	4,960	19.99	New
BJP	Baljeet Ram	4,518	18.21	New
JMM	Ramdeo Ganjhu	4,154	16.75	New
INC	Lakshman Prasad Ganjhu	1,802	7.26	New
CPI	Shankar Baitha	597	2.41	New
Independent	Parra Nayak	483	1.95	New
Margin of victory		2,774	11.18	
Turnout		24,807	16.97	
Registered electors		1,48,848		
JD(U) win (new seat)				
