= Dhirendra Agarwal =

Indian Politician

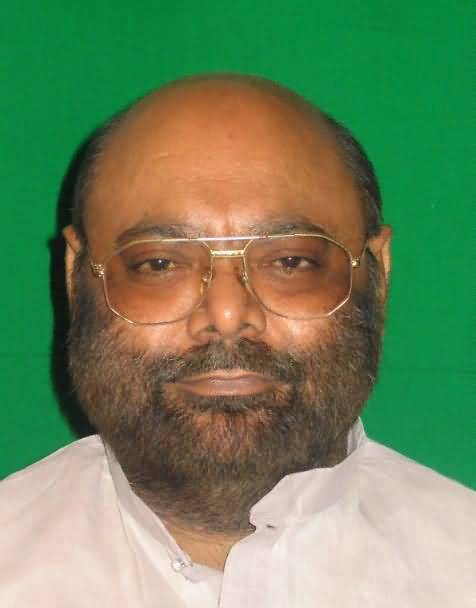

Member of Parliament, Lok Sabha
- In office 16 May 2004 — 17 May 2009
- Succeeded by: Inder Singh Namdhari
- Constituency: Chatra
- In office May 1996 — 6 October 1999
- Constituency: Chatra

Personal details
- Born: 2 August 1955 (age 70) Kolkata, West Bengal
- Party: Jan Suraaj Party
- Spouse: Sunita Agarwal
- Children: 1 daughter
- As of 25 September, 2006

Dhirendra Agarwal (born 2 August 1955) is a member of the 11th, 12th and 14th Lok Sabha of India . He represents the Chatra constituency of Jharkhand and former member of the Bharatiya Janta Party (BJP) political party. He had won Lok Sabha election in 11th Lok Sabha & 12th Lok Sabha as a member of Bhartiya Janta Party (BJP).
