= Prakash Ram =

Indian politician

Member of Jharkhand Legislative Assembly Latehar (Vidhan Sabha constituency)
- In office 2005–2009
- Succeeded by: Baidyanath Ram
- In office 2014–2019
- Preceded by: Baidyanath Ram
- Constituency: Latehar
- Incumbent
- Assumed office 23 November 2024

Personal details
- Party: Bharatiya Janata Party
- Occupation: Politician
- As of 21 November, 2019

Prakash Ram is three time elected member of Jharkhand Legislative Assembly from Latehar.

== 2005 Jharkhand assembly election ==
Prakash Ram won the 2005 Jharkhand assembly election from Latehar constituency on the ticket of Rashtriya Janata Dal.

== 2009 Jharkhand assembly election ==
In 2009 he was defeated by BJP candidate Baidyanath Ram just on the margin of five hundred votes.

== 2014 Jharkhand assembly election ==
In 2014 assembly election he contested on the ticket of Jharkhand Vikas Morcha (Prajatantrik) from Latehar (Vidhan Sabha constituency) and regained the mandate of people of constituency.

In 2018, Prakash Ram was suspended from his party because of cross-voting in Rajya Sabha poll. Party leader Babulal Marandi wrote a letter to election commission to nullify the vote of Prakash Ram as he has voted against the party.

Before 2019 Jharkhand state assembly election he left Jharkhand Vikas Morcha (Prajatantrik) and joined Bharatiya Janata Party, contesting on the ticket of BJP from Latehar.
