= Kalicharan Singh =

Indian politician

Member of Parliament, Lok Sabha
- Incumbent
- Assumed office 2024
- Preceded by: Sunil Kumar Singh
- Constituency: Chatra

Personal details
- Party: Bharatiya Janata Party

Kalicharan Singh (Hindi pronunciation: [kaːliːt͡ʃəɾəɳ sɪŋgʱ]), also known as Kali Singh, is an Indian politician and the elected candidate for Lok Sabha from Chatra Lok Sabha constituency. He is a member of the Bharatiya Janata Party.

== Position held ==
Kalicharan Singh is a resident of Sonbigha village near Hunterganj Chatra District. He has been serving as a Member of the Committee on Coal, Mines, and Steel since 26 September 2024. He is also actively engaged in social and cultural activities, serving as the Patron of Roti Bank Chatra.

== See also ==
- 18th Lok Sabha
- Bharatiya Janata Party
