= Krishna Nand Tripathi =

Indian politician

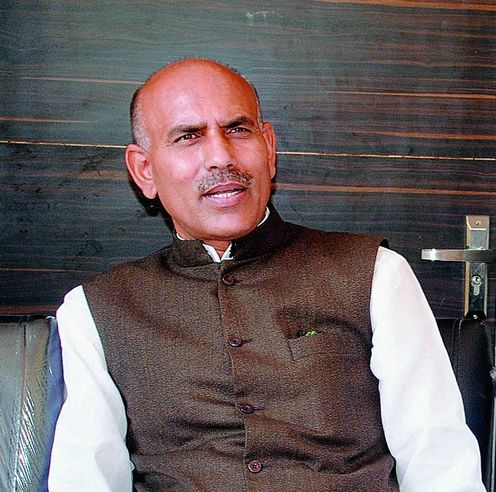

Member of Jharkhand Legislative Assembly
- In office 2009 – 2014
- Preceded by: Inder Singh Namdhari
- Succeeded by: Alok Kumar Chaurasiya
- Constituency: Daltonganj

Personal details
- Party: Indian National Congress

Krishna Nand Tripathi (born 1977) is an Indian politician from Jharkhand. He represented from Daltonganj in Palamu district in Jharkhand Legislative Assembly from 2009.

== Early life and education ==
Tripathi is from Daltonganj, Palamu district. He completed his graduation in law in 2001 at Delhi University, Delhi.

== Career ==
Tripathi first won as an MLA in the 2009 Jharkhand Legislative Assembly election from Daltonganj Assembly constituency representing Indian National Congress. He polled 43.571 votes and defeated his nearest rival, Dileep Singh Namdhari, of Bharatiya Janata Party by a margin of 4,233 votes. He contested in the 2019 Jharkhand Legislative Assembly election representing Indian National Congress but lost to Alok Kumar Chaurasiya. He also contested the 2024 Indian general election in Jharkhand from Chatra Lok Sabha constituency on Congress ticket but lost to Kalicharan Singh of Bharatiya Janata Party.

== Electoral performances ==
Year	Election	Party	Constituency name	Result	Votes gained	Vote share%	Margin	Ref
2005	2nd Jharkhand Assembly	INC	Daltonganj	Lost	16,147	11.26%	29,239	
2009	3rd Jharkhand Assembly	INC	Daltonganj	Won	43,571	29.66%	4,233	
2014	4th Jharkhand Assembly	INC	Daltonganj	Lost	54,855	27.59%	4,347	
2019	5th Jharkhand Assembly	INC	Daltonganj	Lost	82,181	37.69%	21,517	
2024	18th Lok Sabha	INC	Chatra	Lost	3,53,597	32.55%	2,20,959	
2024	6th Jharkhand Assembly	INC	Daltonganj	Lost	1,01,285	38.10%	890	

== See also ==
- Delhi United FC
