= Yogeshwar (name) =

Yogeshwar is an Indian masculine given name. The Sanskrit word yogeśvara is a compound of yoga and īśvara. It has the meanings "master in magical arts", "master in yoga", "deity", and has been used as an epithet for Krishna, Vetala, Yajnavalkya, and others. A South Indian analogue of this name is Yogeswaran.

== Notable people ==
- C. P. Yogeshwar (born 1962), Indian politician from Karnataka
- Ranga Yogeshwar (born 1959), Luxembourgish physicist and science journalist
- Yogeshwar Dayal (1930–1994), Indian judge
- Yogeshwar Dutt (born 1982), Indian freestyle wrestler
- Yogeshwar Prasad Yogesh (?–2007), Indian politician from Uttar Pradesh/Uttarakhand
- Yogeshwar Raj Singh (born 1967), scion of Kawardha Raj family
