= Inder Singh Namdhari =

Indian politician (born 1942)

Inder Singh Namdari
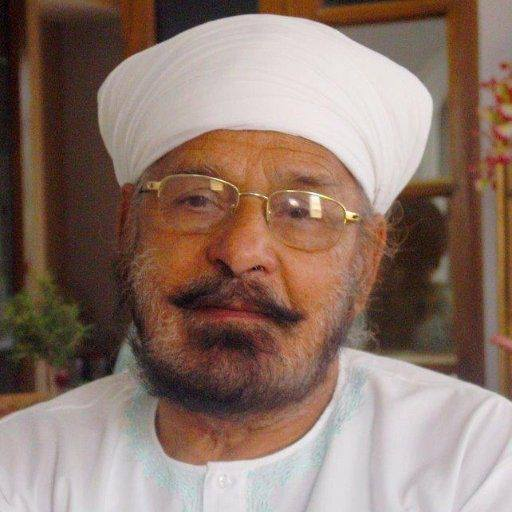

Member of Parliament Lok Sabha
- In office 16 May 2009 – 17 May 2014
- Preceded by: Dhirendra Agarwal
- Succeeded by: Sunil Kumar Singh
- Constituency: Chatra

1st Speaker of the Jharkhand Legislative Assembly
- In office 22 November 2000 – 29 March 2004
- Preceded by: position established
- Succeeded by: Bagun Sumbrai
- In office 4 June 2004 – 11 August 2004
- Preceded by: Bagun Sumbrai
- Succeeded by: Mrigendra Pratap Singh
- In office 15 March 2005 – 14 September 2006
- Preceded by: Saba Ahmad
- Succeeded by: Alamgir Alam

Member of the Jharkhand Legislative Assembly
- In office 2000–2009
- Preceded by: (Himself) constituency was situated in Bihar
- Succeeded by: Krishna Nand Tripathi
- Constituency: Daltonganj

Member of the Bihar Legislative Assembly
- In office 1990–2000
- Preceded by: Ishwar Chandra Pandey
- Succeeded by: (Himself) constituency switched to new state of Jharkhand
- Constituency: Daltonganj
- In office 1980–1985
- Preceded by: Puran Chand
- Succeeded by: Ishwar Chandra Pandey
- Constituency: Daltonganj

State President of Bharatiya Janata Party - Bihar
- In office 1988–1990
- Preceded by: Kailashpati Mishra
- Succeeded by: Tarakant Jha

Personal details
- Born: 11 September 1942 (age 84)
- Party: Independent
- Other political affiliations: Janata Dal (United); Bharatiya Janata Party

Inder Singh Namdhari (born 11 September 1942) is an Indian politician. He was a member of the Indian Parliament, and represented Chatra (Lok Sabha constituency).

He won the 2009 Indian general election as an independent candidate, with support from the Bharatiya Janata Party and was first Vidhan sabha speaker of Jharkhand. He was prominent leader of Vanachal state movement which demanded separate state for south Bihar.
