= Alok Kumar Chaurasiya =

Indian politician

Member of the Jharkhand Legislative Assembly
- Incumbent
- Assumed office 2024
- Preceded by: Krishna Nand Tripathi
- Constituency: Daltonganj

Personal details
- Party: Bharatiya Janata Party
- Other political affiliations: Jharkhand Vikas Morcha
- Parent: Anil Kumar Chaurasiya (Father)

Alok Kumar Chaurasiya is an Indian politician and an MLA elected from Daltonganj block of Jharkhand state as a member of Bharatiya Janata Party 2019. He completed his 12th grade (I.Sc.) from G.L.A. College, Daltonganj, in the year 2012. As of the latest declaration, his total assets are valued at ₹5,45,12,846 (~₹5 crore+), and he has liabilities amounting to ₹35,00,000 (~₹35 lakh+).
