= Yogeswaran =

Yogeswaran is a Tamil given name and surname, a variant of Yogeshwara. Notable people with the name include:

- Manickam Yogeswaran (born 1959), Sri Lankan Tamil musician
- Sarojini Yogeswaran, Sri Lankan politician
- S. Yogeswaran, Sri Lankan Tamil politician
- V. Yogeswaran (1934–1989), Sri Lankan Tamil politician
