= Bholenath =

Epithet of Shiva

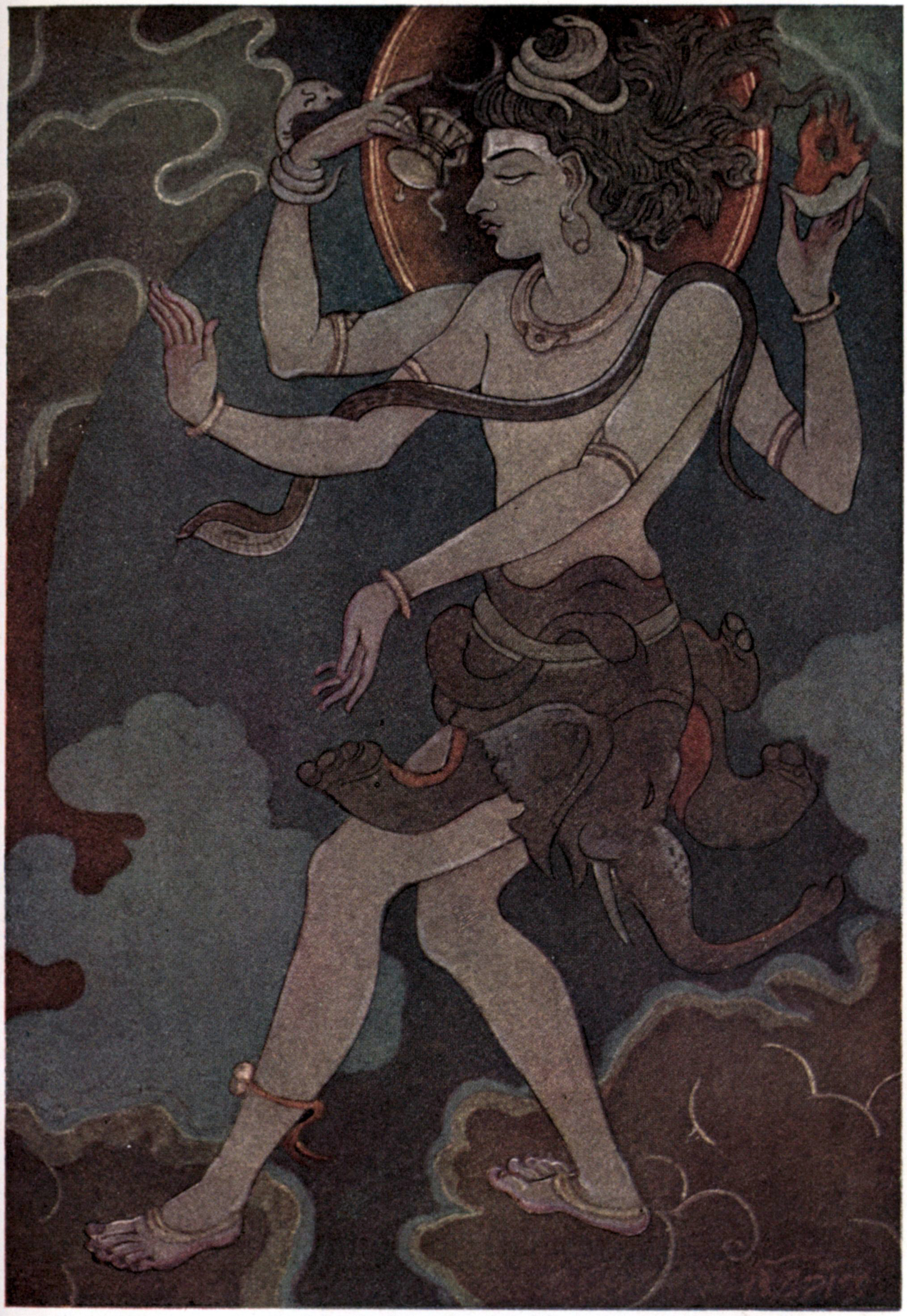
Painting of Shiva, the bearer of this epithet.

Bholanatha (Sanskrit: भोलानाथ, romanized: Bholānātha, lit. 'lord of innocence'), also popularly rendered Bholenath due to Hindi influence, is an epithet of the Hindu god Shiva. The epithet indicates the status of Shiva as the lord (nātha) of innocence (bholā).

== Legend ==
The epithet of Bholanath is sometimes associated with the episode of Bhasmasura. In this legend, the aforementioned asura sought the boon of turning anything he touched to ash after propitiating Shiva. His boon granted, the asura decided to test the boon on Shiva himself, attempting to reduce the deity to ash as the latter fled. Shiva prayed to Vishnu, who appeared in the form of Mohini, the beautiful enchantress. She tricked Bhasmasura into placing his own hand on his head while teaching him to dance, thus saving the innocent Shiva.

== See also ==
- Parameshvara
- Yogeshvara
- Nataraja
