= Latehar Assembly constituency =

Constituency of the Jharkhand legislative assembly in India

Coordinates: 23.747°N 84.507°E

Latehar
- Constituency No. 74 for the Jharkhand Legislative Assembly

Constituency details
- Country: India
- Region: East India
- State: Jharkhand
- District: Latehar
- Lok Sabha constituency: Chatra
- Established: 2000
- Total electors: 269,835
- Reservation: SC

Member of Legislative Assembly
- 6th Jharkhand Legislative Assembly
- Incumbent Prakash Ram
- Party: BJP
- Elected year: 2024

Latehar Assembly constituency is an assembly constituency in the Indian state of Jharkhand. And after partition from Bihar, new state Jharkhand came into existence on 15 November 2000 and Latehar Vidhansabha came under Jharkhand.

== Members of the Legislative Assembly ==
Election	Name	Party
Bihar Legislative Assembly
Before 1957: see Latehar cum Manatu constituency
1957	John Munzani (Note: Two member constituency)	Chota Nagpur Santhal Parganas Janata Party
1957	Lal Jagdhatri Nath Shah Deo	Chota Nagpur Santhal Parganas Janata Party
1962	John Munzani	Swatantra Party
1967	T. Singh	Indian National Congress
1969	Jamuna Singh	Bharatiya Jana Sangh
1972	Vijoy Virendra Kumar	Indian National Congress
1977-80: Constituency did not exist
1980	Indra Nath Bhagat	Indian National Congress
1985	Haridarshan Ram	Indian National Congress
1990	Ramdeo Ram	Bharatiya Janata Party
1995	Baljit Ram	Janata Dal
2000	Baidyanath Ram	Janata Dal (United)
Jharkhand Legislative Assembly
2005	Prakash Ram	Rashtriya Janata Dal
2009	Baidyanath Ram	Bharatiya Janata Party
2014	Prakash Ram	Jharkhand Vikas Morcha
2019	Baidyanath Ram	Jharkhand Mukti Morcha
2024	Prakash Ram	Bharatiya Janata Party

== Election results ==
=== Assembly election 2024 ===
2024 Jharkhand Legislative Assembly election: Latehar
Party	Candidate	Votes	%	±%
BJP	Prakash Ram	98,062	44.74	▲11.66
JMM	Baidyanath Ram	97,628	44.54	▲2.49
JLKM	Santosh Kumar Paswan	4,295	1.96	New
Independent	Rakesh Paswan	3,745	1.71	New
BSP	Prakash Kumar Ravi	2,678	1.22	▼0.51
Independent	Shrawan Paswan	2,426	1.11	New
API	Brahamdev Ram	2,386	1.09	New
NOTA	None of the Above	4,518	2.06	▼0.96
Margin of victory		434	0.20	▼8.78
Turnout		2,19,204	71.12	▲3.68
Registered electors		3,08,236		▲14.23
BJP gain from JMM		Swing	▲2.69	

=== Assembly election 2019 ===
2019 Jharkhand Legislative Assembly election: Latehar
Party	Candidate	Votes	%	±%
JMM	Baidyanath Ram	76,507	42.04	▲27.67
BJP	Prakash Ram	60,179	33.07	▲5.35
Independent	Santosh Kumar Paswan	15,985	8.78	New
JVM(P)	Aman Kumar Bhogta	8,700	4.78	▼39.66
Independent	Sanjay Kumar	4,278	2.35	New
BSP	Ramesh Ganjhu	3,143	1.73	▼0.65
Independent	Virendra Paswan	1,827	1.00	New
NOTA	None of the Above	5,503	3.02	▲0.36
Margin of victory		16,328	8.97	▼7.75
Turnout		1,81,967	67.44	▲1.27
Registered electors		2,69,835		▲11.47
JMM gain from JVM(P)		Swing	▼2.40	

=== Assembly election 2014 ===
2014 Jharkhand Legislative Assembly election: Latehar
Party	Candidate	Votes	%	±%
JVM(P)	Prakash Ram	71,189	44.45	New
BJP	Brajmohan Ram	44,402	27.72	▼5.14
JMM	Mohan Ganjhu	23,022	14.37	▲4.78
RJD	Vijay Kumar	4,916	3.07	▼29.38
BSP	Digambar Ram	3,806	2.38	▼0.66
CPI	Shravan Kumar	2,751	1.72	New
JBSP	Tulsi Ram	2,219	1.39	New
NOTA	None of the Above	4,270	2.67	New
Margin of victory		26,787	16.72	▲16.31
Turnout		1,60,170	66.17	▲4.96
Registered electors		2,42,068		▲41.04
JVM(P) gain from BJP		Swing	▲11.58	

=== Assembly election 2009 ===
2009 Jharkhand Legislative Assembly election: Latehar
Party	Candidate	Votes	%	±%
BJP	Baidyanath Ram	34,522	32.86	New
RJD	Prakash Ram	34,084	32.44	▲18.69
JMM	Ramdeo Ganjhu	10,076	9.59	▼0.22
INC	Suresh Ram	7,865	7.49	New
Independent	Ramnath Ganjhu	5,999	5.71	New
Independent	Ram Ratan Baspati	3,731	3.55	New
BSP	Yugal Kishor Ram	3,189	3.04	▲1.83
Margin of victory		438	0.42	▼3.53
Turnout		1,05,054	61.21	▲4.00
Registered electors		1,71,628		▼28.24
BJP gain from RJD		Swing	▲19.11	

=== Assembly election 2005 ===
2005 Jharkhand Legislative Assembly election: Latehar
Party	Candidate	Votes	%	±%
RJD	Prakash Ram	18,819	13.75	▼6.24
JMM	Ramdev Ganjhu	13,421	9.81	▼6.94
JD(U)	Baidyanath Ram	13,040	9.53	▼21.65
Independent	Phulchand Ganjhu	9,411	6.88	New
Independent	Shyam Ram	3,441	2.51	New
Independent	Ram Sevak Baitha	3,215	2.35	New
BSP	Bigu Mochi	1,643	1.20	New
Margin of victory		5,398	3.95	▼7.24
Turnout		1,36,824	57.21	▲40.54
Registered electors		2,39,166		▲60.68
RJD gain from JD(U)		Swing	▼17.42	

=== Assembly election 2000 ===
2000 Bihar Legislative Assembly election: Latehar
Party	Candidate	Votes	%	±%
JD(U)	Baidyanath Ram	7,734	31.18	New
RJD	Prakash Ram	4,960	19.99	New
BJP	Baljeet Ram	4,518	18.21	New
JMM	Ramdeo Ganjhu	4,154	16.75	New
INC	Lakshman Prasad Ganjhu	1,802	7.26	New
CPI	Shankar Baitha	597	2.41	New
Independent	Parra Nayak	483	1.95	New
Margin of victory		2,774	11.18	
Turnout		24,807	16.97	
Registered electors		1,48,848		
JD(U) win (new seat)				

== See also ==
- Vidhan Sabha
- List of states of India by type of legislature
