= Yogeshwar Prasad Yogesh =

Indian politician

Yogeshwar Prasad Yogesh (died 2007) was an Indian politician. Yogeshwar Prasad Yogesh was a member of the (Bihar) state legislature representing Dhanbad & Chatra before it became part of Jharkhand.

Yogeshwar Prasad Yogesh was elected to a seat in the Bihar Legislative Assembly in 1971.

He was a Member of Parliament representing Chatra district (Jharkhand). He was the Chairman of The National Commission for Backward Classes, Govt. Of India. He was the Chairman of The Labour Cell. Held several government portfolios in the Bihar govt. The challenging project of Mahatma Gandhi Setu (Patna, Bihar) was constructed under his tenure and supervision.

He was the son of a rich Zamindar Basudev Prasad (who owned several collieries under his name). Yogesh had everything he could probably ask for, his father provided him a rich lifestyle but this never satiated him as he always felt a higher calling - 'To help and stand for those who are in need'. He never lost track of his purpose, studied hard and cracked the Civil Services Exam but still this made him feel as he couldn't possibly help the people enough.
