= Yogeshvara =

Hindu epithet

Yogeshvara (Sanskrit: योगेश्वर, romanized: Yogeśvara, lit. 'Lord of Yoga') is a Sanskrit epithet employed in Hinduism. The term Yogeshvara is a portmanteau of yoga and ishvara, meaning 'Lord of Yoga', 'Lord of Yogis', or 'God of Yoga'. The term is primarily employed to address the deities Shiva and Krishna.

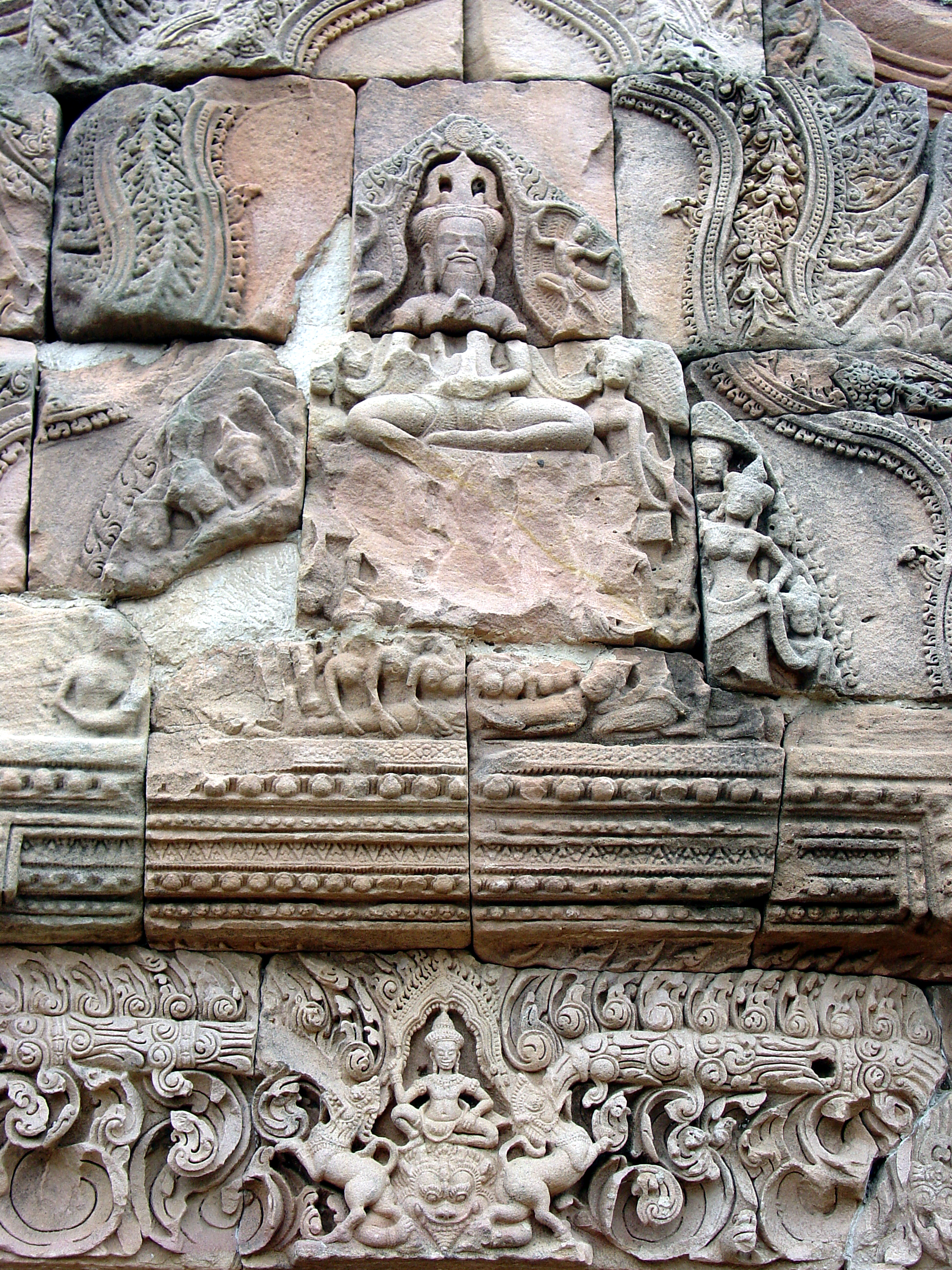
Shiva as Yogeshvara, Phnom Rung.

== Hinduism ==
The term is an epithet of Krishna in Vaishnavism and Shiva in Shaivism, both of them are also known as Parameshvara, the supreme god in their respective sects.

Yogeshvara is a main deity in the Swadhyaya Movement, along with Shiva, Ganesha, and Parvati.
