= Hataka =

Country mentioned in ancient Sanskrit epic Mahabharata

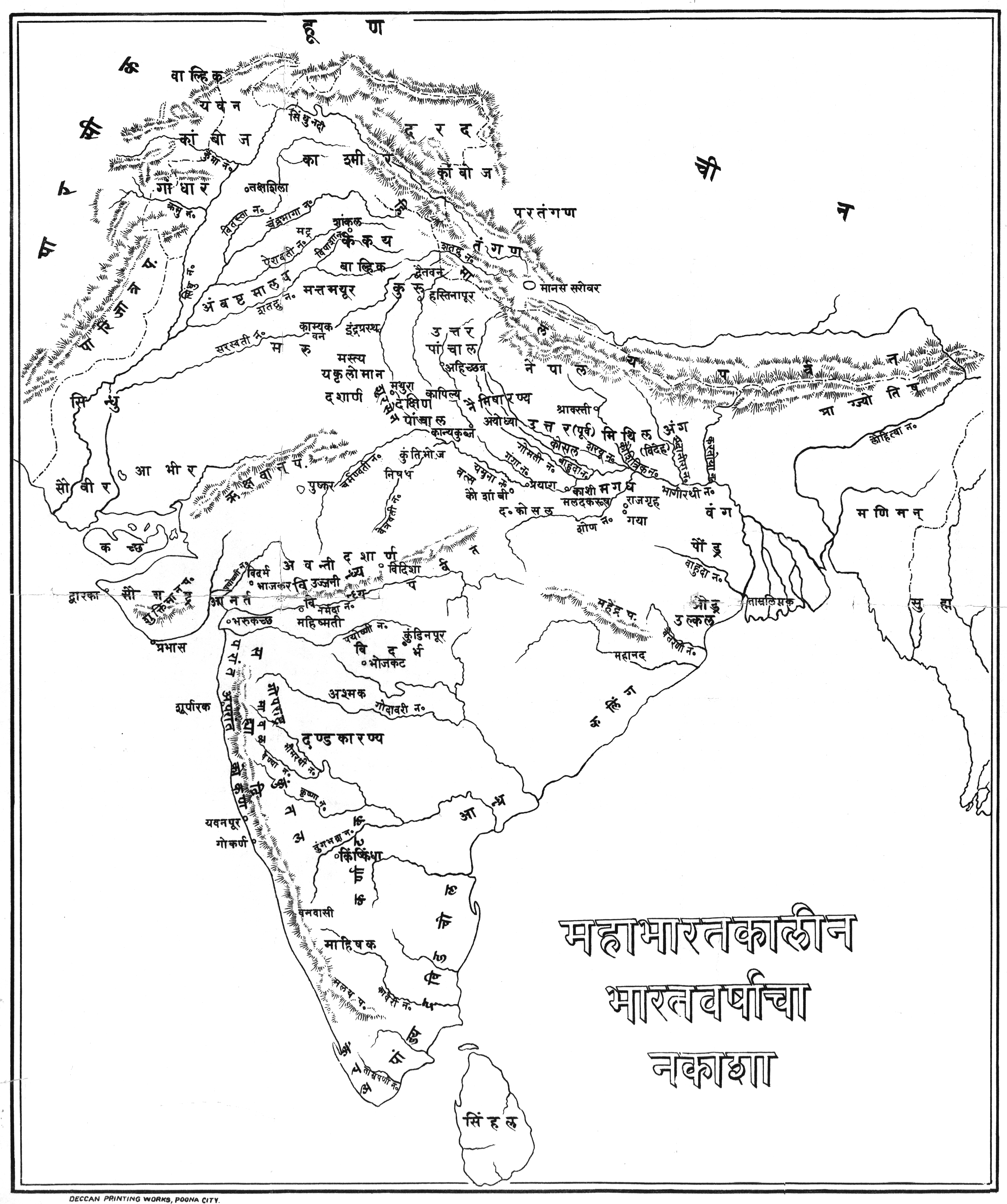
India during the Mahabharata

Hatak, हाटक or Harataka is a state mentioned in some translations of the Mahabharata, one of the two major Sanskrit epics of ancient India in Hinduism. The epic, which narrates the struggle between two groups of cousins culminating in the Kurukshetra War, mentions Hataka as a northern land conquered by Arjuna, a Pandava prince and one of the major protagonists of the Mahabharata.

According to a translation by Kisari Mohan Ganguli, it is stated that the state is inhabited by Yakshas (Guhyaka), a class of nature spirits in the epic.

- At the time of the Mahabharata, Arjuna conquered the north land (had conquered or was conquering?) in the context – "तं जित्वा हाटकं नाम देशं गुह्मकरक्षितम्, पाकशासनिरव्यग्रः सहसैन्यः सभसदत्।"
- It is possible that the location of the poet Kālidāsa 'Meghadūta' and the 'Alka' will be located near Hataka.
- Hataka was stated to be near Mansarovar(Lake Manasa) – "सरोमानसामासाद्यहाटकानभितः प्रभु, गंधर्वरक्षितं देशमजयत् पंडवस्ततः".

In Mahajanapada Period (600–325 BC), Kambojas (Sanskrit:- कम्बोज)(Assamese/Banglaকম্বোজ), which is a Mahajanapadas, Capital was Hataka.

== Aitihasik Sthanavali ==
According to the 1969 book Aitihasik Sthanavali by Vijayendra Kumar Mathur, the following was the info given about the kingdom.

- The current state of Hataka was nearby Mansarovar and Kailash in Tibet, inhabited by Yakshas and Gandharva.
- In the opinion of Mr. C. V. Law, Hataka is the current Attock city in the Punjab province of Pakistan.
- According to N.L. De, Hataka is the name of Huna Kingdom.
