= Arsala =

Village in Odisha, India

Coordinates: 21.840139°N 85.568325°E

Arsala is a village located in Jhumpura Block of Kendujhar district in Odisha, India. The village has a population of 3540, of which 1803 are males while 1737 are females as per the Population Census 2011. Balibandha, Khuntapada and Rimuli are the nearby villages to Arsala. The PIN Code of Arsala is 758031.
