= Khuntapada =

Village in Odisha, India

Coordinates: 21°36′N 85°33′E

Khuntapada is a village located in Jhumpura Block of Kendujhar district in Odisha, India. The village has a population of 1293 of which 650 are males while 643 are females as per the Population Census 2011. Arsala, Balibandha, Chauthia, Asanpat are the nearby villages to Khuntapada. The PIN Code of Khuntapada is 758031.
