= Naxalite movement in Bhojpur =

Peasant uprising under the leadership of Left wing organizations

- Part of Naxalite-Maoist insurgency
- Ekwari village (Bihar)
Date	1970–2002
Location	Bhojpur district Bihar 25.297513°N 84.499390°E

Belligerents
Communist Party of India (Marxist–Leninist) Liberation	Government of Bihar; Bhojpur landlords

Commanders and leaders
Jagdish Mahto †; Rameswar Ahir. †; Ram Naresh Dusadh Dr. Nirmal Mahato †; Ramayan Ram †; Singhasan Chamar †	

Units involved
	Bihar Police Force; Indian paramilitary units Armed gangs of the landlords

Naxalite movement in Bhojpur or Bhojpur uprising refers to the class conflict manifested in armed uprising of the 1970s, that took place in the various villages of the Bhojpur district of Bihar. These clashes were part of the Naxalite-Maoist insurgency in the state, which mobilised the agricultural labourers and the poor peasants against the landlords, primarily belonging to upper-castes. A distinguished feature of these insurgencies were their confinement to the villages, and the nine towns of the Bhojpur district remained unaffected from the periodic skirmishes between the armed groups. One of the reason sought for this peculiar feature is the absence of modern industries in the district. The economy of the district was primarily agrarian, and the industrial proletariat class was absent.

According to police records, the Naxalite movement in Bhojpur was spread across nine out of sixteen Blocks of the district, and a total of 150 village were affected by the armed uprising. In Sahar block, however, the entire population of the poor peasants was believed to be the participants of armed uprising against the feudal order. According to author Arun Sinha, due to caste composition of the belligerent groups in the uprising, it was often portrayed as the reaction against the "caste based oppression". The causes behind the uprising were, however, not the "caste consciousness".

== Demography and economic status of castes ==
In Bhojpur, according to Arun Sinha, most of the landlords were from the upper-caste; they were Rajput, Bhumihar, Brahmin and Kayastha. The agricultural labourers belonged to the Schedule Caste or the Backward Castes like Yadav, Kurmi and Koeri. It was evident that in the absence of the hold of communists over the movement, it had been turned into caste based riots. Over time, many Rajput and Brahmin degraded to the class of poor peasants, and many Koeri and Yadavs became well-to-do; the changed equation, changed the alignment in the district as well. Some of the youths from the Brahmin caste became sympathetic to the movement in the later phase, when the Naxalite movement became mature after seven years of insurgency. In the initial phase of Naxalite movement, even the poorest of the poor among Bhumihar and the Rajputs supported the landlords of their caste.

== Background ==
Statues of the founders of Naxalism in Bihar, from left to right, Jagdish Mahto, Rameswar Ahir, Ramnaresh Dusadh, Subrato Datta and others.

Ekwari is one of the large village near Sahar in Bhojpur district, and majority of landowners here belonged to Bhumihar caste; there were 250 houses in all, belonging to this particular caste, who were the prominent landholders of the region. They not only enjoyed high economic status, but also controlled the local power politics. Some of these landholders argued that they're not Zamindars, but were the ryots of Raja of Benaras before independence and the largest landholding, they had, was also below 100 bighas. The zeal to control the power structure of the village became the trigger point for emergence of Naxalism, when an educated youth named Jagdish Mahto was beaten by the Bhumihars, while he tried to prevent them from rigging the votes. Mahto later became one of the founders of the Naxalism in the Bhojpur along with Rameswar Ahir.

To meet with the challenge posed by the rebelling peasants and agricultural labourers, the landlords of Ekwari mobilised the non-landlord section of their caste. One of the most common feature of the early phase of armed uprisings by the Dalits and the lower-castes was the combined action of the landlords and their castemen. The solid "caste unity" between the upper-caste landlords and their fellow castemen often led to attack on Dalit bastis (rural settlements inhabited by Dalits) and forcing latter into submission through economic blockade, which was possible only due to active collaboration of the non-landlord section of the upper-caste.

However, later in Ekwari, due to democratization of the upper-castes, and the fear of violent reaction from the peasantry, combined with the insignificant consequences of the participation in the oppressive tactics of the landlords of their caste, forced the upper-castes to withdraw their support from the anti-peasant struggles. The result was emergence of caste-based "private armies" of the landlords, which could be mobilised for their anti-peasant struggle. Regularisation of the private armies or the armed gangs, however, led to concentration of the landlord's support among their kinsmen and militias only, and their larger support base among their fellow castemen was diluted over time.

== Social relations in Bhojpur ==
Prior to the emergence of Naxalism in Bhojpur, the question of economic exploitation was not the only cause behind the confrontation between the labourers and the landlords. According to author Kalyan Mukherjee, the case of Bhojpur, among other militant uprisings of the agricultural labourers and peasants, was different and was driven primarily by two factors. The activism here was driven by the concern for Ijjat (honour) and the 'upper-lower caste conflict'. In the decades prior to emergence of militancy, the lower caste women were often subjected to rampant sexual tyranny of the upper-caste landlords. The lower-caste men were dehumanised, and even sitting in front of the landlord and wearing a clean dhoti was considered as a challenge to latter's authority. They [landlords] also condemned the spread of education among the lower-castes.

The link of Rajput and Bhumihar landlords with state apparatus and the access to means of production along with their capitalistic drive for profit maximisation paved the way for exploitation of the Dalit landless labourers. The Dalits, hence, suffered denial of basic human dignity; they were given extremely low wages, and their womenfolks were subjected to periodic sexual tyranny from the upper-castes. Author Arun Sinha believes the contemporary landlords of the Ekwari to be invincible on the ground of higher position in the bureaucracy of their kinsmen, political power possessed by them, and ownership of hundreds of weapons. They also employed majority of the population of village as their agricultural labourers and enjoyed the benefits of productivity of the agricultural tracts in the adjoining region of Sone Canal. Sinha also describes the sexual atrocities against the womenfolks of the agricultural labourer.

Born a slave, his life is firmly tied to the spade, the sickle and the landlord's feet. He produces everything that the landlord boasts of, and yet his children do not have enough to eat. Every day some landlord or the other takes away his wife and his grown up daughters. If his working daughter is not molested in the fields during the day, a son of some landlord will break into his single-room mud hovel in the night and humiliate her right there...

The practice of taking Dola– a custom in which newly wed bride of a labourer was forced to spend her first night with the Rajput and Bhumihar landlords, was also prevalent in some pockets. Another face of 'sexual oppression' against the lower-caste women was legitimisation of the sexual assaults through the cult of Mathin Mai. As the legend goes, in the Behea state of Bhojpur, a Rajput landlord named Ranpal Singh raped a Brahmin woman, when her Dola (Palanquin) was passing through his area. The subsequent suicide of the victim popularised her as Mathin Mai, who became a cult figure in the region. The justifiability for the practice of taking Dola, thus, comes from the story of Mathin Mai. But, the story of Mathin Mai also became symbol of horror for countless Dalit women, who were threatened to travel to Arrah, because of the possibility of rapes by the dominant section of society, the landlords.

== Early activism ==
Before the resurgence of the armed rebellion against the feudal order, the educated youths among the lower-castes organised themselves under the leadership of people like Jagdish Mahto, who led a massive rally in the Arrah, demanding Harijanistan (land of Dalits). According to Kalyan Mukherjee, the town of Arrah, in 1969, witnessed one of the massive torch-light procession in its history. Those who led this procession were Mahto, Ram Ekbal Dusadh, Latafat Hussein and Prabhu Harijan. The mob shouted slogans like Harijanistan lekar rahenge (we will fight for a state of Harijans). The leaders, along with the ordinary participants in the procession, then gathered at Ramna Maidan. The agitation of Mahto and his associates for Harijanistan motivated Samyukta Socialist Party (SSP) to organise the most deprived section of the Backwards and the Schedule Castes, outside the Ahir-Kurmi-Koeri section. This procession and later political activities by the SSP, became prelude to the emergence of Maoism in the state of Bihar.

After being assaulted by the Bhumihars of Ekwari village, while trying to prevent the vote rigging at the Polling Booth, which was established at the house of a big landlord Nathuni Singh, Mahto initiated a drive to influence the people around him in pro-poor ideas, including the fellow teachers at his school. By the end of 1969, he started taking leave from the work frequently. Earlier, whenever he used to take leave, series of mysterious events, like burning of a landlord's haystack and cutting of his crops, without his knowledge used to take place. During this period, such activities became more frequent. Soon, he applied for a three-month leave from the H.D Jain College, and joined the underground activities actively.

== Beginning of uprising ==
It was Ekwari village of the Sahar block in Bhojpur district, which became the centre of organised armed movement. The leaders of the movement were Jagdish Mahto, Rameswar Ahir and Ramnaresh Dusadh. They were influenced by the successful uprising in the Naxalbari region of North Bengal, and began organising like minded youths, mostly belonging to lower-castes. In his attempt of mobilising the cadre of his future group, it took Mahto two years, until Rameswar Ahir, a former bandit, returned after serving twelve years of sentence, in a murder case. Reportedly, Mahto broke down after seeing Ahir, and they decided to work for social change. On 23 February 1971, the first individual assassination was witnessed in Ekwaari, when a lathail (lathi-wielding assistant of the landlords), Sheopoojan Singh was assassinated and his dead body was found near Sone Canal. A Zamindar, Chittaranjan Singh registered the case against Jagdish Mahto, Rameswar Ahir and their associates, Bhikhari Kahar, Maharaj Mahto and Singhasan Chamar.

From 1971 to 1973, nearly fifteen big Zamindars were assassinated, and the term "Naxalite" in the context of this particular region, came to denote, 'a person, who fights against sexual oppression'. One reason behind this was assassination of Rajput Zamindars like Thana Singh of Jagdishpur, who is said to be a tyrant. Soon, after these assassinations of the most infamous landlords, the stories about the action of the Naxalite groups, who were understood as the supporters of poor, began to spread in the Dalit enclaves of the village. From Ekwari, the activities of the group (Naxalites) began spreading in other villages too. In a short period of time, the villages like Dallamchak, Sikarhatta, Kolodheri, Nerath and Bahuara also came into the grip of left-wing terrorism.

On 6 May 1973, the Chauri village came into national limelight after a clash, that happened between the paramilitary forces and the labourers. The deployment of the forces was done by the authorities, in order to investigate the case of grain looting incidents, that were occurring frequently in the village and the regions around it. When the police and paramilitary forces entered the village, in order to arrest the suspected people, involved in grain looting cases, the villagers, mostly belonging to Dalit and Backward Castes put up a fierce resistance against them.

The root cause of the police intervention was the activism of Ganeshi Dusadh, a Comrade of Mahto, who was one of the important guriella fighter of the CPI-ML. Under Dusadh, the guriellas initiated the drive of looting the hoarded grains of the rich traders, and oraganizing assassinations of the tyrant landlords and moneylenders. They also confiscated some of the lands of the big landlords and motivated peasants to perform sowing operation on them. The looted grains were also routinely distributed to the needy. Their activities created turmoil in the village for at least six month, until the paramilitary forces arrived in 1973. Apart from the police and paramilitary personnels, the henchmen of the landlords also arrived, in a bid to counter their activities. In hours long battle, between the paramilitary and landlord's henchmen on one side and the labourers and peasants on another, some of the important activists like Lal Mohar Dusadh and Ganeshi Dusadh received bullet injuries. While, Lal Mohar Dusadh died on the spot, Ganeshi Dusadh was declared dead on the way to Hospital.

Other activists like Balkeshwar Dusadh and Dinanath Teli died at the Arrah Hospital on same day. On the side of police and landlords, 19 people were injured. Apart from the sacking of 40 maunds of grain from a rich trader, which instigated the intervention by the security forces, the two years long struggle for the higher wages by the agricultural labourers in the Chauri village also deteriorated social relations between the landlords and the labourers. As a response to the labourers demand to enhance their wages, the landlords had not only refused to do so, but also asked the other landlords from the neighbouring villages to not employ any of the labourers from the village of Chauri, thus forcing an "economic blockade" on them [labourers].

It was this wage struggle, in the course of which local leadership had developed in the state under Ganeshi Dusadh. The landlords, threatened by the dismantling of the cordial relationship between them and the labourers, were searching for an opportunity, which could be utilised to disrupt the leadership of the labourers. The grain looting incident had provided them the excuse to interfere. In May 1973, when the incident took place, the landlords complained to the nearby police station about the robbery and sought intervention in the Dalit enclaves by the police, where according to them, the looted grain was stored.

The police intervened and they [policemen] were assisted by the armed gangs of the landlords as well. According to Sinha, the party armed with guns and lethal weapons, surrounded the Harijan Tola (rural settlements inhabited by the Dalits), and started beating the men, women and the children. The villagers, mostly Dalits, resisted with their Lathis and Sickles. One of the landlord pointed toward Dusadh, thereafter he was shot. However, since he was still alive, he was dragged by two landlords towards the nearby Sone Canal, where they mounted on his chest and used their daggers to tore up his stomach. The police and the landlords then tortured other people; Dinanath Teli, Lalmohar Dusadh and Balkeshwar Dusadh were also tortured and shot.

The police reported that the firing incident was an 'act of self defence' on their part, as the Dalits had Bomb, Rifles and other lethal weapons. The killings, however, emboldened the landlords, and in order to regulate the labour- landlord relationship like before, they continued their economic blockade on the Dalits and refused to employ them in their agricultural fields. In this scenario, the labourers of the neighbouring villages assisted the labourers of Chauri village with food supplies and by refusing to work for the landlords of either their own villages or for the landlords of Chauri. The landlords of Chauri now declared that they won't allow any of the cattles of the Dalits to graze on the village lands, and some incidents of atrocities came out, when the violation of the declaration took place. A labourer was locked up by the landlords, while a woman was raped by another landlord, just because her buffalo had rubbed itself against latter's haystack. The police neglected these incidents. Against this background, in 1974, Naxalite pressure increased once again and police also initiated its oppressive measures to dilute the mounting pressure.

In August 1974, on an information, a Deputy Superintendent of Police raided the village of Baruhi. He was informed that a poor peasant, Shyamlal Mahto, had been providing the refuge to Naxalites, and arranging training for the new recruits. The police party surrounded the home of Shyamlal Mahto and a landless labourer named Muni Pasi was shot dead. The increased skirmishes led to deployment of a company of Central Reserve Police Force (CRP) in the village; Bhojpur police now resorted to home to home campaign, in order to liquidate the radicalisation of the villagers. A significant operation of the CRP happened in the Pathar village of the Piro police station area, where in an encounter Rameshwar Ahir– one of the founder leader of Bhojpur uprising, was killed. Along with Ahir, a landless labourer Avinash Chamar was also killed.

== Repression by the police ==
After the death of Rameswar Ahir, police continued their repressive tactics, and on 3 April 1974, the police surrounded Chapra village of the Piro police station area. The siege continued for whole night, and the police kept on warning the alleged Naxalites to surrender themselves, who were allegedly firing at them. After exchanging fire for a couple of hours, four landless labourers; Asgu, Sheo Narayan, Lal Mohar and Vishwanath came outside from their hideouts and proceeded towards the policemen for surrender. But, the police made all of them stand in a line, and shot them one by one. In the same year, on 9 April, another landless peasant named Hiranand Dusadh was arrested at Arrah. The police also shot him at night on the day of his arrest. The killings continued from the side of police, and in May 1974, two more people were shot by them on the allegations of being Naxalites, in the Dullamchak village. Babu Rao Chandavar, a Sarvodaya leader, visiting the village after encounter said the report of encounter to be malicious.

== Spread to other regions ==
With time, the struggle against the landlords spread to other regions. The account of George Kunnath from the village called Dumri, located in Jehanabad district of Bihar reveals the strong presence of the Maoists here. The labourers in the village co-opted with the Maoists and a parallel judicial system was set up in the district by latter, where the tyrant landlords were tried for the atrocities they committed on the Dalit men and women. Kunnath notes that here the armed movement started in 1980 and the Dalits here joined the movement enthusiastically, demanding better wages, end of sexual abuse of the Dalit women and discrimination and other such demands. Here also, the upper-caste landlords were the prime accuse of the atrocities and they retaliated against the Dalits and Maoist using their caste based militia, which were backed by state.

Kunnath records the presence of discrimination in rural Bihar, while he was working for a Jesuit-inspired literacy program there. He mentions an incident when he was invited for the tea by the villagers of a Brahmin dominated village and when he was served the tea, he noticed that the cup, in which tea was served to him was brought from the same Dalit household, with whom he was staying. According to him, the Brahmins considered him Dalit or untouchable (as he was staying with Dalits) and thus served him the tea in a separate cup.

=== Maoist courts ===
People's Court, as noted by George Kunnath were the alternative dispute resolution mechanism organised by the Maoists in the region, in which the landlords and the victim Dalits used to be the parties. The punishment ranged from being moderate to severe, and in some cases, where the punishment was moderate, it wasn't helpful to deter the feudal ways employed by the landlords. Kunnath has mentioned one such incident, where he was informed by his Dalit companions about a people court being organised secretly, in which he was about to participate. He mentions the reaction of the accused landlords and charges against him and was also made aware by Dalits that the particular accused was tried earlier too, but he was booked once again for the sexual abuse of Dalit women.

I had been informed about a forthcoming Maoist people's court in which a landlord was to be tried for allegedly raping a Dalit woman and for various other offenses against Dalit laborers. With my anthropological curiosity, I was looking forward to participating in it. A few days before it was to take place, the accused landlord himself came to meet me. He appeared worried and requested that I personally be present during the court proceedings. He perhaps thought that my presence as a researcher from outside might lead to some kind of leniency in the trial.

== Aftermath ==
After imposition of National Emergency in India, the repression by police extended. The movement was brought to end after the death of first crop of leaders like Jagdish Mahto, Nirmal Mahto, Fagu Mahto, Chamku Musahar and others. Immediately after that, heavy security forces were deployed in the region to maintain law and order. In order to safeguard their lives and property, landlords organized themselves in village resistance groups, which took the initiative to patrol the troubled areas at night.
