= Baruna =

Village in Odisha, India

Coordinates: 21.913891°N 85.636686°E

Baruna is a village located in Jhumpura Block of Kendujhar district in Odisha in East India. The village has a population of 752, of which 369 are males while 383 are females as per the Population Census 2011. Chauthia, Rimuli, Badanai, Asanpat, Karanjia and Baruna are the nearby villages to Chauthia. The PIN Code of Baruna is 758044 and its postal head office is Karanjia (Kendujhar).
