= Jagdish Mahto =

Indian communist activist (died 1972)

Jagdish Mahto Master Saheb

Politburo Member of Communist Party of India (Marxist-Leninist)
- In office 1970–1972

Personal details
- Born: Ekwari, Bhojpur, India
- Died: 1972
- Cause of death: Murder
- Party: Communist Party of India (Marxist–Leninist)
- Occupation: Teacher

Jagdish Mahto was an Indian communist activist. He was a naxal leader who led the 1970 Bhojpur uprising in the landlord-dominated Bhojpur region of Bihar. He was a member of the Communist Party of India (Marxist–Leninist), an organisation which was leading the Naxalite insurgency in Bihar. He also fought against the upper-caste landlords for the cause of lower-caste people. Mahto, also called Master Saheb, was a member of the Bihar State Committee of CPI(M–L) and one of the founding leaders of the party in Bhojpur.

== Life ==
Jagdish Mahto was born in Ekwari, Bihar. He was a member of Koeri community. Mahto established a newspaper called Harijanistan ("Land of Dalits") in order to voice support for the rights of the Dalits. Shri Bhagwan Singh Kushwaha, a former Minister in the Government of Bihar, is Mahto's son-in-law.

Prior to his involvement in the Naxalite movement, Mahto taught science at Harprasad Das Jain College, Arrah. Later in his life, he developed an interest in politics and was inspired by the writing of Karl Marx. Later, he became an Ambedkarite after reading the philosophy of B. R. Ambedkar. Mahto was a staunch supporter of the rights of the Dalits. He was also against many of the privileges that the upper castes enjoyed, particularly those who had been "twice born"(dvija). When Bengal and Punjab experienced a Dalit upsurgence in 1967, the Bihar region saw no similar uprising from the oppressed sections of the society. Scholars attribute this lack of uprising to prevalent landlordism and the dominance of upper castes in the area, creating fear within lower castes. The first spark of Naxalism developed in Mushari, but it was soon extinguished by feudalistic forces.

== Communist upsurge under Mahto ==
In the 1967 election, Mahto was supporting his friend Ram Naresh Ram in the elections to the legislative assembly, who was running on the ticket of the Communist Party of India (Marxist) against a candidate supported by local Bhumihars. When Mahto went to the polling booth, he saw that a Bhumihar youth was preventing voters from casting their votes. Mahto spoke out against this and was beaten badly by other Bhumihars. He was admitted to the hospital, where he remained for several months. After being discharged, Mahto became sympathetic to radical ideas. Mahto met Charu Mazumdar during this period, who had led a "communist uprising" in Bengal and had travelled to Bhojpur to deliver a speech against the landlords.

Mahto formed an alliance with other like-minded youths, including Ram Naresh Ram and Rameswar Ahir. They assembled their supporters under the Communist Party of India (Marxist–Leninist) Liberation. They began organising murders of landlords and their henchmen. According to author Bernard D'Mello:

Reportedly, the Master would prevail upon his Dalit followers to go forth to "force [their] acceptability as human beings." His practical lesson was: "This is a gun, the weapon of subjugation. Hold it straight, [and] go and deliver justice."

By the end of the 1970s, a large number of landlords were killed. The movement pushed for economic reforms (e.g., eliminating unpaid labour of the Dalits for their masters) as well as increased respect for the Dalits. Prior to the movement, there were virtually no consequences for landlords who engaged in unwanted sexual contact with Dalit women. The Dalits were mostly landless labourers who were fighting under Jagdish Mahto for their honour.

== Associates ==
One of the most notable associates of Mahto was Ganeshi Dusadh, who is described as an outstanding guerrilla fighter. He was the son of a landless bonded peasant from the Chauri village of the Sahar block. Under the leadership of Dusadh, the CPI-ML guerrilla fighters made several attacks on the regional landlords. They killed landlords as well as moneylenders, which was followed by the confiscation of their lands and the organisation of peasants to sow those lands. In addition, the grains of large trading companies were seized and distributed by the guerrillas. For at least six months in 1973, the Chauri village remained under the control of the Naxalites' revolutionary committee. On 6 May 1973, the armed police force entered the village along with the henchmen of the local landlords. The battle that ensued saw the villagers and CPI-ML guerrillas under Ganeshi Dusadh fighting the police and henchmen of the landlords. After a twelve-hour-long conflict, Ganeshi Dusadh was killed.

== Participation in revolutionary uprisings across Bhojpur ==
=== Ayar Rebellion of 1972 ===
The Ayar village of Jagdishpur was a stronghold of Rajput landlords and Thana Singh, one such landlord, had committed several offenses against the Musahars and Chamars of the village. Two-thirds of the land in the village was controlled by these landlords, including Charichan Singh and Madho Singh. A sentiment against the poor condition of the lower caste in the village began brewing in 1957 but was suppressed by the landlords through the use of brute force.

In 1962, the ongoing skirmishes between the lower castes and the landlords led to the deaths of peasant leaders Shivratan Yadav and Bhikhari Yadav and the offenses against lower-caste women continued. According to Kalyan Mukherjee, the village was so unpopular among the Dalits that no Dalit family of another village would want to have a family member married to a resident of the village. The tipping point to revolt was the sexual harassment of the wife of Ramayan Chamar, who used to work as an agricultural labourer in the fields of Charichan Singh, by the sons of her landlord. Chamar's complaint to Charichan Singh led to his physical assault by the men of Charichan Singh. The disgruntled Chamar joined the "Jagdish Mahto group", also called as Ekwari ke Master Saheb ka group. In the retaliation by Mahto and his armed group, who were invited to the village by Chamar, Thana Singh was assassinated; another landlord, Hari Singh, was injured and killed later by the rebels.

=== Activism and anti-landlord activities in Bhojpur ===
On 14 April 1970, Mahto, along with Rameswar Ahir and Latafat Hussain, organised a massive rally and candle march in support of Harijanistan, a separate territory to be inhabited by the lower-castes. The rally was supported by a large number of landless labourers and backward-caste peasants. Mahto also ran a drive against the concept of untouchability in the villages of Inrukhi, Baruna and Koshiyar. Anti-landlordism prevailed in the village of Ekwari, a few kilometres away from Arrah.

The village of Ekwari was known for its fertile land and the feudal dominance of the upper-caste who exploited the lower-caste. The women of the lower caste were raped with impunity to such an extent that it was accepted as a social norm. The Naxalbari revolt in West Bengal motivated Mahto and his friend Ramnaresh Dusadh, who were joined by a bandit called Rameswar Ahir, to lead an armed uprising against the exploitative Zamindars. In a bid to find like-minded youths for rebellion against the upper-caste landlords, the three men came together and organised the youths belonging to the lower castes for an armed rebellion. The tipping point in the rebellion was the assault on Gora Chamar and Chandrika Dusadh by the landlords. A group of Koeris and Dusadh under Jagdish Mahto met with the Sub-Divisional Magistrate and a police office was established in the village to handle any future skirmishes.

Rameswar Ahir, who joined Mahto in the struggle against the landlords, started his career as a communist rebel by leaving all of his land claims and joining the underground society of communists along with Mahto. On 23 February 1971, a landlord named Shivpujan Singh, who was accused of raping a Harijan women in a village called Inrukhi, was assassinated by the Mahto group. The assassination followed the murders of a number of other landlords, namely Jagdish Singh, Dudheswar Singh, Mangal Singh, and Paramhans Singh. The attempt by some of them to organise a counter revolution against the communists under Mahto failed. These incidents popularised Ekwari as the "Naxalbari of Bhojpur". Mahto and his wife went underground, and by 1971 the Ekwari village was divided on a class line between two groups, one containing the influential landlords and the other containing poor peasants and the Dalits.

== Death ==
Mahto was killed after being beaten by a Musahar mob who mistook him for a dacoit (bandit). Before dying, Mahto is said to have told one of his comrades that, though he was dying, the upper caste landlords wouldn't dare to touch Dalit women in future.

In an interview with the media outlets in Delhi, Ram Naresh Ram, an associate of Mahto, discussed the conflict that had taken place for decades in Bhojpur between landed gentry and the subordinate tenants. The caste strife came to an end years later owing to the killings of the core Naxal leaders and retirement of their subordinates.

== In popular culture ==
Jagdish Mahto became a notable figure among people of Ekwari and several books were written to commemorate his struggle against the landlords for the cause of poor and the deprived. Some of the biographical accounts of Mahto are Bhojpur Mein Naxalvadi Andolan (Kalyan Mukherjee and Rajendra Yadav), Master Saab (Mahashweta Devi), Raktim Tara (Suresh Kantak), and Arjun Zinda Hai (Madhukar Singh).

== See also ==
- Brahmeshwar Singh
- Ashok Mahto gang
- Chhatradhar Mahato
