= Zahara =

Zahara may refer to:

== Places ==
- Zahara de la Sierra, a municipality in the province of Cádiz, Andalusia, Spain
- Zahara de los Atunes, a village on the Costa de la Luz in the province of Cádiz, Andalusia, Spain

== Other uses ==
- Zahara (name)
- Zahara (band), a jazz ensemble

== See also ==
- Zahra (disambiguation)
- Sahara (disambiguation)
