= Sahar =

Sahar may refer to:

== People ==
- Sahar (name) (born 1985), Arabic feminine name or Hebrew unisex name
- Sahar (singer) (born 1982), Iranian singer, musician and dancer
- Sahar Aslam (born 1982), Scottish cricketer
- Sahar Ansari (born 1939), Pakistani poet and linguist from Karachi
- Sahar Baassiri (born 1986), diplomat
- Sahar Biniaz (born 1984), Canadian actress, model and beauty queen
- Ben Sahar (born 1989), Israeli footballer

== Places ==
- Sahar, Bihar, town and block in Bhojpur district, Bihar
- Sahar Village, Mumbai
- Sahar, another name for Chhatrapati Shivaji International Airport
- Sahar Elevated Access Road, a road in India

== See also ==
- Sahara (disambiguation)
