= Ram Naresh Ram =

Indian politician (1924–2010)

Member of the Bihar Legislative Assembly
- In office 1995–2010
- Constituency: Sahar

Personal details
- Born: August 16, 1924 Sahar, Bihar
- Died: October 26, 2010 (aged 86) Patna, Bihar
- Party: CPIML Liberation
- Occupation: Politician; Social worker

Ram Naresh Ram (16 August 1924 – 26 October 2010); popularly known as Parasji, was a member of Bihar Legislative Assembly between 1995 and 2010, representing Sahar Assembly constituency from CPI-ML Liberation party.

== Political career ==
Ram Naresh Ram joined in the Communist Party of India in 1951. After the fraction he joined in CPI (M). In 1967, he became the CPI(M) candidate in the Bihar Assembly elections. He participated in the Naxal movement in Ekwari region, and is considered one of the leader of 1970 Bhojpur uprising along with Subrata Dutta (Jauhar), Jagdish Mahto (Master Jagdish), and others.
