= Zahra =

Zahra or Zehra may refer to:

== Buildings and institutions ==
- Alzahra University, female-only university in Tehran, Iran
- Az-Zahraa Islamic Academy, school in Richmond, British Columbia, Canada
- Al-Zahra Mosque, Sydney, Australia
- Behesht-e Zahra, cemetery in Tehran, Iran
- Ennejma Ezzahra ("Star of Zahra"), palace at Sidi Bou Said, northern Tunisia

== People ==
- Zahra (name), female given name and surname, also spelt Zehra, Zohra, and other variants
- Abd al-Zahra, male given name

== Places ==
- Zahra, Ardabil, village in Iran
- Zahra, Kuwait, an area in Kuwait
- Žehra, village and municipality in Slovakia

== Other uses ==
- Zahra, film by Mohammad Bakri (2007)
- Zahra Foundation Australia, anti-domestic violence organisation in Adelaide, South Australia
- Zahrah, title character of Nnedi Okorafor's children's novel Zahrah the Windseeker

== See also ==
- Al Zahra, neighborhood of Mecca, Saudi Arabia
- Az Zahrah, village in San‘a’ Governorate, Yemen
- Az Zuhrah District, in Al Hudaydah Governorate, Yemen
- Al-Zahra', Palestinian municipality in the Gaza Governorate
- Al-Zahraa, village in Aleppo Governorate, Syria
- al-Zahra al-Jadeeda, neighborhood in Damascus, Syria
- Al-Zarah, village in Homs Governorate, Syria
- Buin Zahra, city in Iran
- Medina Azahara city ruins, (Arabic: Madīnat az-Zahrā) in Córdoba (Spain)
- Sarah (disambiguation)
- Sahra, track and album by Algerian musician Khaled
- Zahra's Paradise, political webcomic set in modern Iran
- Zahra's Blue Eyes, Iranian television series
- Zahran (disambiguation)
- Zahret Medien, town in Tunisia
- Zara (disambiguation)
- Zarah (disambiguation)
- Zohra (disambiguation)
- Zahara (disambiguation)
