= Zarah =

Zarah may refer to:

- Zarah (entertainer), American singer and songwriter, also an author
- Zarah Garde-Wilson (born 1978), Australian solicitor
- Zarah Ghahramani (born 1981), Iranian-born author living in Australia
- Zarah Leander (1907 – 1981), Swedish actress and singer
- Zarah, or Ich weiss, es wird einmal ein Wunder geschehen, a song by Nina Hagen
- Zarah Razafimahatratra (born 1994), Malagasy tennis player
- Zarah Sultana, a British-Pakistani politician
- Fort Zarah, Kansas, US

== See also ==
- Zahra (disambiguation)
- Zara (disambiguation)
- Zaraah Abrahams, English actress
