= What Have We Become? =

What Have We Become? may refer to:

- What Have We Become? (album), a 2014 album by Paul Heaton and Jacqui Abbott
- "What Have We Become?" (song), a 2023 song by Zarah
- What Have We Become, a 2006 album by Seemless
