= Zara =

Zara may refer to:

== Businesses ==
- Zara (retailer), a fashion retail company based in Spain
- Zara Investment Holding, a Jordanian holding company
- Continental Hotel Zara, Budapest, Hungary

== People and fictional characters ==
- Zara (name), primarily a given name, including a list of people and fictional characters with the given name or surname
- Zara (Turkish singer), stage name of Turkish folk singer and actress Neşe Yılmaz (born 1976)
- Zara (Russian singer), Russian pop singer and actress Zarifa Pashaevna Mgoyan (born 1983)

== Places ==
- Zara (Dalmatia), a historical and Italian name of the city of Zadar, Croatia
- Province of Zara, a province of the Kingdom of Italy from 1918 to 1947
- Zara, North Carolina, an unincorporated community
- Zara, Turkey, a town and district of Sivas Province
- ZARA (region), a group of ports in Zeebrugge, Antwerp, Rotterdam, and Amsterdam

== Ships ==
- Zara-class of Italian heavy cruisers
  - Italian cruiser Zara, a heavy cruiser that served in the Italian Navy from 1931 to 1941
- SMS Zara, an Austro-Hungarian torpedo cruiser of the 19th century
- USS Zara (SP-133), a patrol vessel that served in the United States Navy from 1917 to 1919

== Music ==
- ZaRa, an EP by Merzbow
- "Zara", a 2011 single by Arty
- "Zara", a song from Gemini by Macklemore, 2017

== Other uses ==
- Zara (game), a dice game
- Zara (Milan Metro), a railway station in Milan, Italy
- 158 Infantry Division Zara, Italian infantry division of World War II
- Zorya, also spelled Zara, in Slavic folklore, a personification of dawn, possibly a goddess
- ZARA, an acronym referring to the ports of Zeebrugge, Antwerp, Rotterdam and Amsterdam
- Zaara, historical term for the Sahara desert
- Zaara (TV series), an Indian TV series

== See also ==
- Zara Spook, a fishing lure
- Zahra (disambiguation)
- Zarah (disambiguation)
- Zarya (disambiguation)
- Zaira (disambiguation)
