= Zahran =

Zahran may refer to:

- Zahran (name), a male given name (including a list of people with the name)
- Zahran, Iran
- Zahran area, Amman Governorate, Jordan
  - Zahran Palace, the eponym of the surrounding Zahran area
- Zahran tribe, an Arabian Peninsula tribe

== See also ==
- Zahra (disambiguation)
- Zahrani River, Lebanon
- Zohran Mamdani (born 1991), American politician
