= B InTune TV =

- B InTune TV Logo
- Genre: Music, Entertainment, Kids/Family
- Created by: Eugene Maillard
- Starring: Zarah
- Theme music composer: David Bateman; Paris Dozier
- Opening theme: "B InTune Theme Song"
- Ending theme: "B InTune Theme Song"
- Country of origin: United States
- Original language: English
- No. of seasons: 8
- No. of episodes: 208

Production
- Executive producers: Eugene Maillard; Zarah
- Production locations: Hollywood, California; Worldwide
- Camera setup: Multi-camera; Film; Videotape
- Running time: 22 minutes
- Production companies: B InTune Productions; (entire run; all)

Original release
- Network: Syndication
- Release: September 10, 2005 – 2012

Related
- B InTune Rewind

B InTune TV (also known as b intune TV) is an American television series for youth and their music hosted by recording artist Zarah. The show debuted on September 10, 2005 on Viacom/CBS Television Group stations that included UPN and ABC on weekend mornings, broadcasting in 120 million television households in the United States with an international growth of 54 countries worldwide and also airs in NBC, Fox, Comcast, CW, Cox Communications, DirecTV, Dish Network and Time Warner Cable stations.

The series focuses on educating and entertaining teenagers (13 years and older) in a variety of segments, using music as a primary tool to incorporate pop culture in an entertaining behavior. The E/I program features many known stars in the music and entertainment industry which gives both children and their parents the educational value and the inside knowledge in music shown in a unique and enlightening perspective.

== Production ==
=== Conception ===
The series' idea was initially conceptualized by creator Eugene Maillard who has a long history of Music and Arts Education high-profile projects for children, including an Emmy Award-winning television special From The Heart (also known as The Kennedy Center Honors – A Celebration of the Performing Arts) for mentally challenged and handicapped children, he executive produced with Gary Smith, which starred icons like Michael Douglas, U2 and Pope John Paul II that aired on NBC in 1989.

Mr. Maillard's vision was based on one of its existing B InTune Media properties, InTune Monthly magazine for younger students, which came with a teacher's guide on music-related subjects that circulated throughout 50,000 middle and high schools in the United States. The goal was to bring hipness to the show like an MTV channel however, combined it with leading educational excellence programs like PBS Kids to produce a signature creation for the series that teenage viewers will embrace. With similar interests in educating children and her background as a musician opening in concerts for famous acts like The Goo Goo Dolls, the popular youth series was co-developed by singer-songwriter Zarah who brought 'freshness' to the show and became the host, the co-executive producer and the contributing screenwriter.

The project is to simply use music as the vehicle to impact teenagers commercially and socially along with their celebrities as a form of edutainment in a variety of important segments, led by a relatable host and other teen correspondents, which is filmed from an inside studio located in Hollywood, California as Mr. Maillard refers, we want to be the coolest television show in America.

In July 2005, Mr. Maillard announced a working title for the TV series called; In Tune TV while musician Zarah was set as the host.

=== Overview ===
The half-hour series begins with its theme song as host Zarah introduces popular musicians and/or celebrities in the entertainment industry with interchangeable segments and occasionally corresponding with teenagers within 22 minutes, to teach 13- to 18-year-olds the basic skills and requirements in life through music but in a fun and entertaining way that meets the Federal Communications Commission (FCC) standard rules and regulations for educational programs. Zarah closes with an original and symbolic motto that was both created by Mr. Maillard and her saying, be in tune, stay in tune at the end of the show, serving as a reminder for all viewers to encourage themselves as well as others, to be more 'in tune' with everything in life.

The series was quickly picked up by Viacom/CBS (own-and-operated) television group among other stations for a (26-episode) weekly show that premiered in September 2005 as B InTune TV. The show reached a 120 million households in over 130 television markets in the United States alone. In addition to its international growth broadcasting in 54 countries which includes Canada, Europe, Asia and others, the E/I-friendly show was supported by InTune Monthly magazine for teenagers and funded in part by the US Department of Education (DOE).

== Segments ==
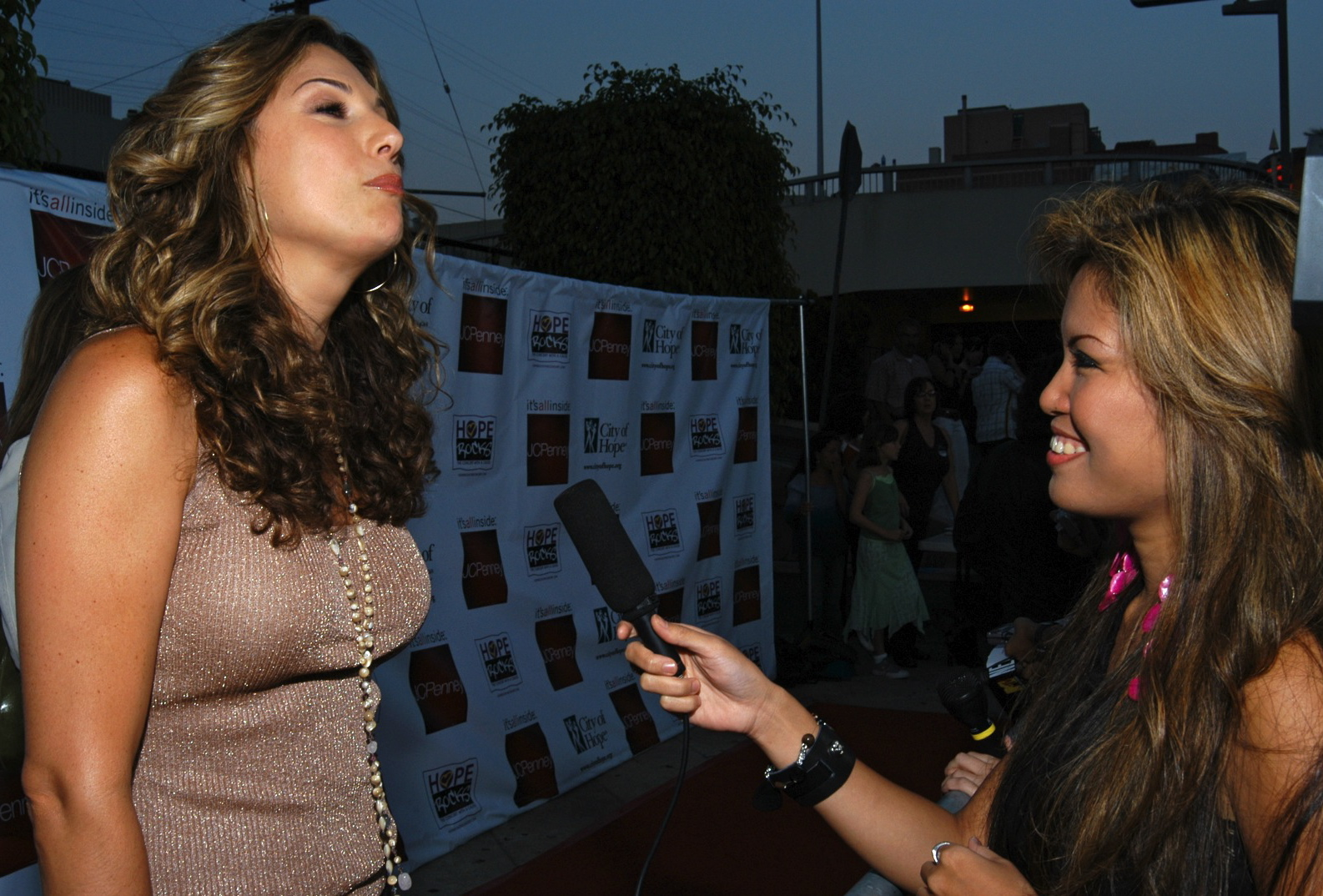
B InTune TV on the scene: TV personality Zarah interviewing Daisy Fuentes at the Hope Rocks event in Hollywood, CA.

=== Healing Power of Music ===
This segment focuses on using music as a powerful therapy and its ability to heal. Guest stars discuss the importance of music as they share their own personal life experiences and topics that are often supervised particularly by teenagers.

- Actual segment(s): Singer-songwriter Alicia Keys casually talks about getting through the difficult moments in her life by listening to her favorite music that provides a sense of comfort, relief and peace; therefore, enabling her to deal with real-life issues effectively, but in a healthy manner. Actor Cuba Gooding, Jr. gets in the mood of his personality, by playing an appropriate song inside his trailer before an actual filming takes place on the set; therefore, expressing how music has always played a major part in his life in every way particularly his career.

=== Career Profile ===
This segment focuses on going behind the scene interviews as a learning process inside the music industry that covers the reality of a working professional.

- Actual segment: Famous rock band The Goo Goo Dolls and their staff are followed by host Zarah to go through the anatomy on how to plan a major concert tour, unveiling the entire process of their production and the group of people involve and their responsibilities. Lead guitarist John Rzeznik also expresses the reward of staying focus on his work; therefore, giving the viewers the educating soul of the music business and the true reality of a collaborative team, hard work, perseverance and patience, a profound meaning in pursuing one's dream successfully.

=== History of Rock'n Roll ===
This segment focuses on inquiring into one of the most popular genres in music known today. rock and roll history is covered in great length from where it started, the known artists and where it is today.

- Actual segment: Interesting background of artists like Bill Haley and the Comets, Little Richard, The Rolling Stones, Led Zeppelin and The Beatles, all who contributed to the richness of rock and roll history, is introduce in the show by host Zarah, starting from what genre it was extracted from (rhythm and blues) in the 1950s, all the way to the current known stars who benefited greatly from learning. This includes some of the greatest artist who ever lived to liking rock and roll music; therefore, providing a detailed history and personal experiences of the greatest pioneers of rock and roll.

=== Today's Lesson ===
This segment focuses on teaching teenagers on how to play an instrument, its functionality and purpose. Within a variety of instruments being shown in several times, this segment is particularly helpful to needy teenagers or parents who could not afford a private lesson for their children.

- Actual segment: Guests like musician Kyle Eastwood are invited inside the studio to explain music or perform live and teach viewers how to play an instrument (often accompanied by a teenager), while showing different ways and valuable techniques in the process; therefore, not only to allow teenagers to explore and learn how to play their favorite instrument, but also having the benefit of a personal teacher to guide in front of them so to speak.

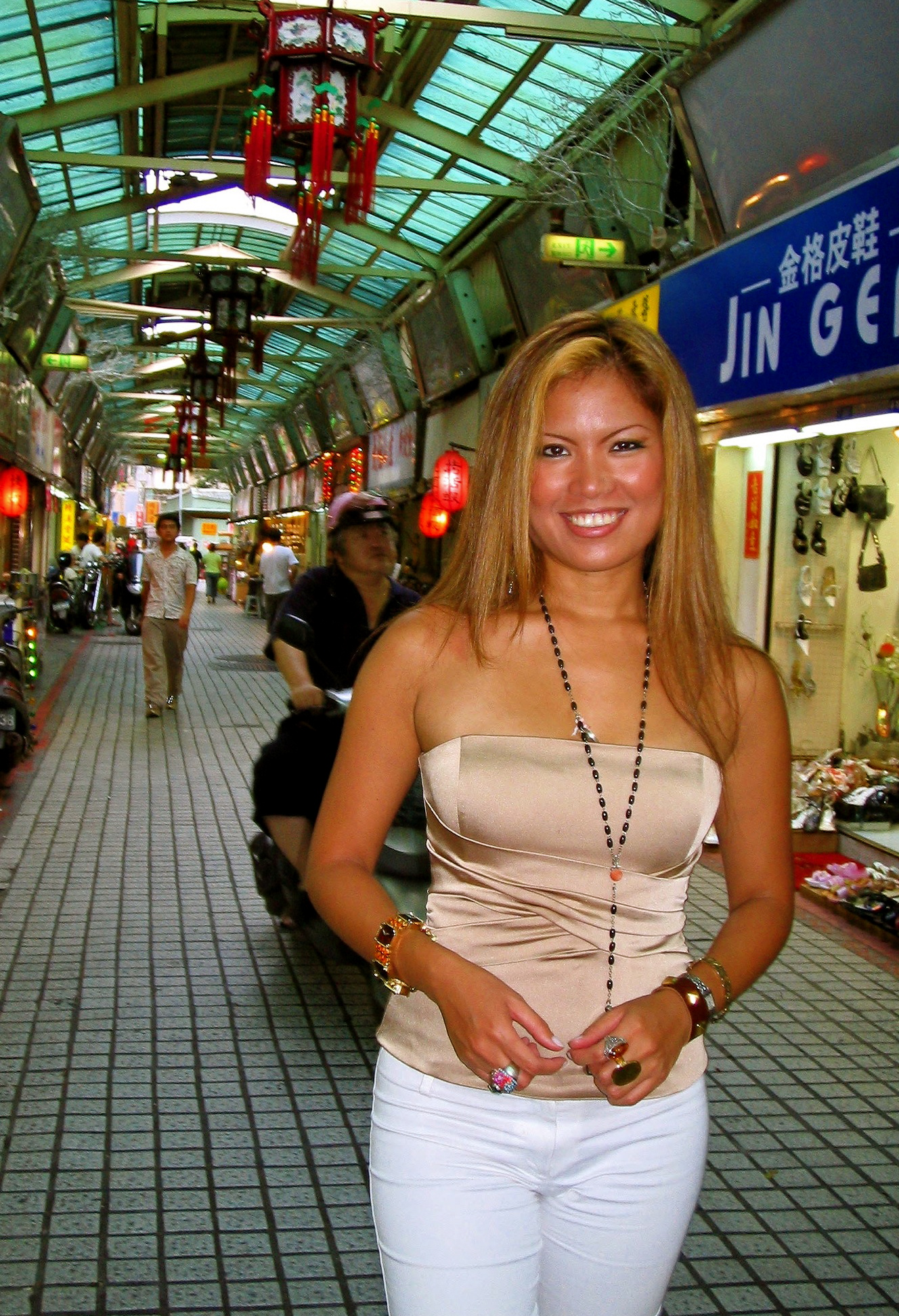
B InTune TV filming on location: Host Zarah at the nearby shops at Snake Alley in Taipei, Taiwan.

=== On Location ===
This segment focuses on filming on locations and in different parts of the world covering major events in interesting places that are eye-opening experiences.

- Actual segment: Host Zarah and her B InTune TV crew go to Taipei, Taiwan to explore and learn about the different cultural background and its breath-taking historical scenes. Interviews take place from random teen idols including their local star favorites on their take on music and how US artists influence their pop culture; therefore, viewers have the ability to learn music in other cultural backgrounds that are seen in a different light but through the common interest in music.

=== New artists ===
This segment focuses on an artist or a group purely on inspiring and motivating teenagers by sharing their personal success stories.

- Actual segment: Pop stars like Aly and AJ or Jesse McCartney is interviewed by host Zarah to talk about their relationship and commitment to music, sharing their personal struggles and being inspired by their music teachers and parents who taught them how to play an instrument at an younger age, as well as the triumph they accomplished making it in the music industry; therefore, encouraging and motivating both parents and teenagers, teaching them a great lesson that hard work can definitely pay off.

=== Legends ===
This segment focuses on observing and honoring both past and present legendary artists who contributed greatly in music history and the legacy they left behind.

- Actual segment: Various legends in the music industry including The Beatles' former member John Lennon and film actor/director Clint Eastwood are introduce to show their dedication and love for music that gave them the purpose in staying true to their passion; therefore, inspiring teenagers with their songs and leaving the essential value of their legacy for music lovers and the generations to come.

=== On the Road ===
This segment focuses on various artists or bands being followed on the move whether behind the scenes, traveling or on their tour.

- Actual segment: Artist or bands such as Hootie & the Blowfish share their life on the road traveling on their tour or simply on location to show a thorough detail on what goes on being in front stage as well as the back center, when they are not performing; therefore, showing the viewers a snapshot and the inside knowledge of their lives as artists on the road.

=== Guest star appearances ===
==== Musicians/Legends ====
- Coldplay
- Alanis Morissette
- Hilary Duff
- Ashlee Simpson
- Led Zeppelin
- Frankie Lymon
- Tom Morello
- Aly & AJ
- The Click Five
- Jesse McCartney
- Yellowcard
- John Lennon
- The Beatles
- Hootie & the Blowfish
- The Rolling Stones
- Styx
- Alicia Keys
- Beyoncé
- Nickel Creek
- Louis Armstrong
- Chris Brown
- Relient K
- Corrine Bailey Rae
- Chuck Berry
- Peter, Paul and Mary
- Avril Lavigne
- Vanessa Hudgens
- JoJo
- Gorillaz
- John Mayer
- Little Richard
- Carly Simon
- Justin Timberlake
- Kyle Eastwood
- Snoop Dogg
- The Who
- Iron Butterfly
- Janet Jackson
- Hope Partlow
- Paul Simon
- Christopher Cross
- Bon Jovi
- Chingy
- Sean Lennon
- Meat Loaf
- Dave Grusin
- Joss Stone
- Plain White T's
- Julian Lennon
- Bill Haley and the Comets
- Lamont Dozier
- Dixie Chicks
- Korn
- John Mayer
- Elvis Presley
- Moonglows
- Mariah Carey
- OK Go
- Rihanna
- Carrie Underwood
- Boys Like Girls
- John Coltrane
- Goo Goo Dolls
- Norah Jones
- Los Lobos
- Joss Stone
- Cher
- Ziggy Marley

==== Actors/Actresses ====
- Cuba Gooding, Jr.
- Brooke Hogan
- Jared Leto
- Daisy Fuentes
- Shirley Jones
- Clint Eastwood
- Tia Mowry
- Tamera Mowry

== Reruns and syndication ==
The series is originally aired on Viacom/CBS television group and UPN Network stations among others, has broadcast in 120 million households in the United States and followed by 54 countries worldwide since its debut in 2005. On its third season in 2007, the show's popularity brought additional educational and informational (E/I) television specials for B InTune Media and created a separate station lineup for reruns, bringing a global audience of 200 million television households in total.

Due to its growth, the non-sensitive Nielsen ratings and US Federal Communications Commission regulated television series is syndicated by major broadcast television and cable networks including NBC, Fox, Comcast, CW, Cox Communications, DirecTV, Dish Network and Time Warner Cable that reaches over 90 million households in the United States and maintained its broadcast affiliates in 54 countries overseas. To date, the popular youth series has been renewed and running its seventh season.

== Music industry collaborators ==
- Warner Bros. Records
- Universal Records
- Capitol Records
- Mercury Records
- Fender
- Where Music Meets Film at Sundance Film Festival
