= Perhap =

Perhap Perhāp
- Village
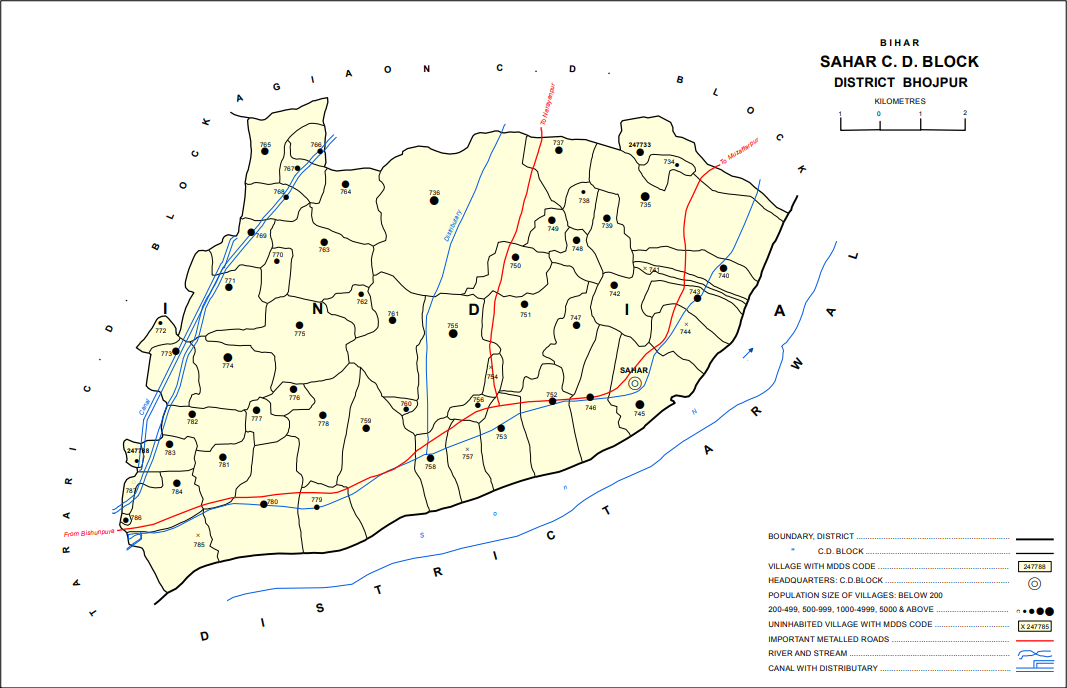
- Map of Perhap (#755) in Sahar block

- Location in Bihar, India Perhap (India)
- Coordinates: 25.2568°N 84.5811°E
- Country: India
- State: Bihar
- District: Bhojpur

Area
  - Total: 0.520 km^{2} (0.201 sq mi)
- Elevation: 87 m (285 ft)

Population (2011)
  - Total: 5,285
  - Density: 10,200/km^{2} (26,300/sq mi)

Languages
  - Official: Bhojpuri, Hindi
- Time zone: UTC+5:30 (IST)
- PIN: 802208

Perhap is a village in Sahar block of Bhojpur district, Bihar, India. As of 2011, its population was 5,285, in 919 households. It is located in the central part of the block.
