= Chhatarpura =

Village in Bihar, India

- Village
- Location in Bihar, India Chhatarpura (India) Chhatarpura (Asia)
- Coordinates: 25°14′36.5″N 84°32′4.1″E
- Country: India
- State: Bihar
- District: Bhojpur

Government
  - Type: Panchayati raj (India)
  - Body: Gram panchayat

Area
  - Total: 505.5 km^{2} (195.2 sq mi)

Population (2011)
  - Total: 1,524
  - Density: 3.015/km^{2} (7.808/sq mi)

Language
  - Official: Hindi
  - Additional official: Urdu
- Time zone: UTC+5:30 (IST)
- Postal code: 802222
- ISO 3166 code: IN-BR

Chhatarpura is a village in Sahar block of Bhojpur district, Bihar, India.

== Demographics ==
As of 2011 Indian Census, Chhatarpura had a total population of 1,524, of which 760 were males and 764 were females. Population within the age group of 0 to 6 years was 285. The total number of literates were 851 (55.8%), with 494 (65%) males and 357 (46.7%) females. However, the effective literacy rate of 7+ age population was 68.7%. The Scheduled Castes population was 288, of which males were 143 and females 145. Chhatarpura had 260 households in 2011.

== Transportation ==
Taxi service is available in the village. Bus service available within 2 km.

== Nearby towns ==
- Nearest town 1:Arrah(Dist:30 km)
- Nearest town 2:Arwal (Dist:7 km)
