= Zahara (name) =

Zahara may refer to the following notable people:

== Stage name ==
- BeBe Zahara Benet (born 1980), Cameroonian-American drag queen
- Zahara (Spanish musician) (born 1983), Spanish singer-songwriter
- Zahara (South African musician) (1987–2023), South African musician and poet

== Given name ==
- Zahara Hyde (born 1963), British track and field athlete
- Zahara Maala Luyirika (born 1987), Ugandan lawyer, politician, and activist
- Zahara Mitu, Bangladeshi film actress and presenter
- Zahara Monique Bassett, American transgender activist
- Zahara Nakiyaga, Ugandan beauty pageant contestant
- Zahara Nampewo, Ugandan lawyer, human rights activist, and academic
- Zahara Nandawula, Ugandan boxer
- Zahara Rubin (born 1932), Israeli sculptor, painter and artist
- Zahara Schatz (1916–1999), Israeli artist
- Zahara Temara (born 4 July 1997), Australian rugby league footballer
- Zahara Umud, Ethiopian politician

== Surname ==
- Alex Zahara, Canadian television, film, and voice actor
- Che Zahara (1907–1962), Malay activist
