= Balibandha =

Village in Odisha, India

Coordinates: 21.896255°N 85.574411°E

Balibandha is a village located in Jhumpura Block of Kendujhar district in Odisha. The village has a population of 2,391, of which 1,167 are males while 1,224 are females as per the Population Census 2011. Rimuli, Arsala and Chauthia are the nearby villages to Balibandha. The PIN Code of Balibandha is 758031.
