= Porjanpur railway station =

Railway Station in Odisha, India

Porjanpur

General information
- Location: Porjanpur, Kendujhar, Odisha; India
- Coordinates: 21°47′24″N 85°31′19″E
- Elevation: 456 m (1,496 ft)
- System: Indian Railways station
- Line: Padapahar–Jakhapura branch line
- Tracks: 5 ft 6 in (1,676 mm) broad gauge

Construction
- Structure type: Standard (on-ground station)
- Parking: Available

Other information
- Status: Functioning
- Station code: PRNR
- Zone(s): East Coast Railway
- Division(s): Khurda Road
Location
- Location within Odisha Location within India

Porjanpur railway station, located in the Indian state of Odisha, serves Porjanpur, Palasponga and Jhumpura in Kendujhar district. It is on the Padapahar–Jakhapura branch line.

Four passenger trains pass through Porjanpur railway station.
