= Zohra =

Zohra (Arabic: زهرة, Persian: زهره) may refer to:

== People ==
=== Given name ===
- Zohra Mama (1961–1995), Algerian Kabyle singer-songwriter
- Zohra Aïssaoui (born 1950), Algerian Chaoui singer, known professionally as Dihya
- Zohra Al Fassiya (1905–1994), Moroccan singer and poet
- Zohra Begum Kazi (1912–2007), Bangladeshi physician and activist
- Zohra Bensalem (born 1990), Algerian volleyball player
- Zohra Daoud (born 1954), American TV celebrity and model
- Zohra Drif (born 1934), Algerian politician and lawyer
- Zohra Lampert (born 1937), American actress
- Zehra Nigah (born 1937), Urdu poet from Pakistan
- Zohra Rasekh (1969–2025), Afghan women's rights activist
- Zohra Sarwari, Afghan-American author, business coach, entrepreneur
- Zohra Sehgal (born 1912), Indian stage and film actress
- Zohra Aghamirova (born 2001), Azerbaijani rhythmic gymnast

=== Middle name ===
- Fatima Zohra Karadja (born 1949), Algerian Vice-President for the African Union's Economic, Social and Cultural Council for Northern Africa
- Fatima-Zohra Oukazi (born 1984), Algerian volleyball player

=== Surname ===
- Lalla Fatima Zohra (1929–2014), eldest daughter of King Mohammed V of Morocco

== Other uses ==
- Zohra (film), a 1922 film
- Zohra Orchestra, Afghan women’s orchestra
- Arabic name for the planet Venus

== See also ==
- Zahra (disambiguation)
- Zohran Mamdani (born 1991), American politician
