= Sahara (disambiguation) =

The Sahara is one of the world's large deserts, located in northern Africa.

Sahara may also refer to:

== Businesses ==
- Sahara Las Vegas, a hotel and casino in Las Vegas, Nevada
- Sahara Tahoe, a resort casino in South Lake Tahoe, now the Hard Rock Hotel and Casino (Stateline)
- Sahara India Pariwar, an Indian company
  - Air Sahara, a former Indian airline, now JetLite
- Sahara Airlines (Algeria), a defunct domestic airline
- Sahara Bank, a former bank based in Libya
- Sahara Shopping Park, a commercial zone in Pezinok, Slovakia

== Music ==
- Sahara (Orphaned Land album)
- Sahara (House of Lords album)
- Sahara (Sarbel album)
- Sahara (McCoy Tyner album)
- Sahara (The Rippingtons album)
- "Sahara", a song from the film Sivaji
- "Sahara", a song by DJ Snake featuring Skrillex from his album Encore
- "Sahara," a song by Relient K from their album Forget and Not Slow Down
- "Sahara," a song by Nightwish from Dark Passion Play
- "Sahara," a song by Cutting Crew from their debut album Broadcast
- "Sahara" (Slash song), from the album Slash
- Sahara, a band made up by Romanian singer, songwriter and producer Costi Ionita and Andrea, a female Bulgarian music singer

== Books ==
- Sahara (novel) (1992), by Clive Cussler
- Sahara (Palin book) (2002), by Michael Palin

== Film and television ==
- Sahara (1919 film), an American drama
- Sahara (1943 American film), a war drama starring Humphrey Bogart
- Sahara (1943 Hindi film), a Bollywood film
- Sahara (1958 film), an Indian Bollywood film
- Sahara (1983 film), an American adventure film starring Brooke Shields
- Sahara (1995 film), starring James Belushi, an Australian remake of the 1943 Humphrey Bogart film
- Sahara (2005 film), starring Matthew McConaughey and based on the novel by Clive Cussler
- Sahara (2017 film), a French Canadian animated adventure film
- Sahara with Michael Palin (2002), a TV travel documentary series

== Sports ==
- Sahara Invitational, a former professional golf tournament played in Las Vegas
- Sahara Cup, a former cricket series between Pakistan and India played in Canada

== People ==
- Sahara Davenport (1984–2012), American drag queen
- Sahara Khatun (1943–2020), Bangladeshi politician
- Sahara Lotti (born 1980), American screenwriter and actress
- Sahara Smith (born 1988), American singer-songwriter
- Sahara (actress) (born 1991), Bangladeshi actress
- Dylan Sahara (1992–2018), Indonesian actress
- Kenji Sahara (born 1932), Japanese actor
- Sahara Chowdhury (born 2002), Bangladeshi lgbt activist

== Other uses ==
- Sahara, Pezinok, a locality and sídlisko in Pezinok, Slovakia
- Apostolic Vicariate of Sahara, a former Roman Catholic missionary jurisdiction
- A variant of the Breguet Deux-Ponts, a 1940s French double-decker military transport aircraft
- Sahara Avenue, in Las Vegas
- Sahara (LV Monorail station), a monorail station in Las Vegas
- Sahara Press Service, official press agency of the government in exile of the Western Sahara
- Sarah (cheetah), also known as Sahara, a female cheetah that lived in the Cincinnati Zoo, Cincinnati, Ohio

== See also ==
- List of all pages beginning with "Sahara"
- Sahar (disambiguation)
