= Az-Zahraa Islamic Academy =

Location
- 8580 #5 Road; Richmond, BC, V6Y 2V4; Canada; 49°9′3″N 123°5′28″W

Information
- School type: Independent
- Motto: "Rabbi Zidni Ilman, Walhiqni Bis Swaliheen" (My Lord, increase me in knowledge and make me of the virtuous)
- Religious affiliation: Islamic
- Established: 2003
- Oversight: Shia Muslim Community of BC
- Head: Mr. Paul R. Cohee
- Grades: Junior KG to Grade 7
- Colours: Burgundy, Grey, Gold
- Affiliations: FISA
- Website: www.azia.ca

Az-Zahraa Islamic Academy (informally referred to as AZIA) is an independent Pre-school through Grade 7 school in Richmond, BC.

== About the Academy ==
AZIA, an outreach program of the Shia Muslim Community of BC, is part of the Az-Zahraa Islamic Centre located at 8580 #5 Road. The Academy is open to students of all denominations and religious backgrounds.

== Montessori Pre-School ==
Az-Zahraa Islamic Academy Montessori Program is licensed to care for up to 54 children between the ages of 30 months and 5 years old. In addition to learning and playing through the Montessori philosophy, students receive Quranic Studies instruction. Children eligible for Kindergarten who have completed one or two years of Montessori may register for a hybrid program of Montessori combined with regular elementary Kindergarten instruction.

== Elementary School and Middle School ==
Az-Zahraa Islamic Academy is a registered Independent School under the auspices of the Office of Independent Schools BC Ministry of Education. It is classified as a Group 1 school under British Columbia's Independent School Act. It receives 50% of the funding designated per student in the Richmond District #38 from the Ministry of Education. The school receives no funding for capital costs.

AZIA adheres to all regulations established in the Independent School Act.

- Core teachers hold university degrees, have completed a recognized Teacher Professional Development Program, and are certified by the BC College of Teachers. Their qualifications make them eligible to teach in public or independent schools throughout the province.
- Specialty teachers are certified by the Inspector of Independent Schools. Their qualifications have been verified in their area of instruction.
- The curriculum meets the learning outcomes established by the Ministry of Education and includes instruction in: English Language Arts, Social Studies, Mathematics, Science, Physical Education, Fine Arts, Health and Career Education, French (Grades 4–8), and Daily Physical Activity.
- Classes in Islamic Studies and Quranic Studies are included.
- AZIA participates annually in the Foundations Skills Assessment (FSA). The results are not included in the Fraser Institute Report Card ranking due to having few than 15 test takers. Since 2008:

Grade 4: 90% Meeting or Exceeding Expectations in Reading & Writing; 95% Meeting or Exceeding Expectations in Numeracy
Grade 7: 100% Meeting or Exceeding Expectations in Reading, Writing & Numeracy

- Special emphasis is given to character development, spiritual growth and leadership.
- Instructional Hours: 8:25am–3:25pm Monday-Friday

== Interfaith Outreach ==
Az-Zahraa Islamic Centre which houses the Academy is one of nearly twenty temples, mosques, and churches representing a multitude of different religious faiths, along Richmond's #5 Road, otherwise known as the "Highway to Heaven". It was one of the finalists in the 2007 Seven Wonders of Canada contest organized by the CBC's The National and Sounds Like Canada CBC Radio program as a representation of multiculturalism.

The Academy has been featured in the Richmond Review newspaper for its cooperation with the Richmond Jewish Day School. A series of friendly basketball games has led to a mutually supportive relationship between the schools.

AZIA hosted the first multi-faith Junior Police Academy in BC run by the RCMP National Security Division. During the training students from Muslim, Christian, Jewish and Sikh schools come together to learn what it takes to be a Mountie.

In 2010, in addition to student and alumni individual winners, the Academy won the overall trophy at the Inter-Faith for World Peace Youth Symposium.

== Environmental Education ==
The campus lies within the Agricultural Land Reserve. As part of the program of study, the students learn environmental stewardship.

The intermediate students build and install mason bee homes in the Centre's orchard. The students maintain and document the bee population throughout the year.

The primary students raise salmon for release as part of the Salmonids in the Classroom project. A grant from TD Canada Friends of the Environment Foundation enabled the Academy to purchase a customized refrigeration unit for critical temperature stability to ensure maximum success rate.
