= Zahara Nandawula =

Ugandan boxer

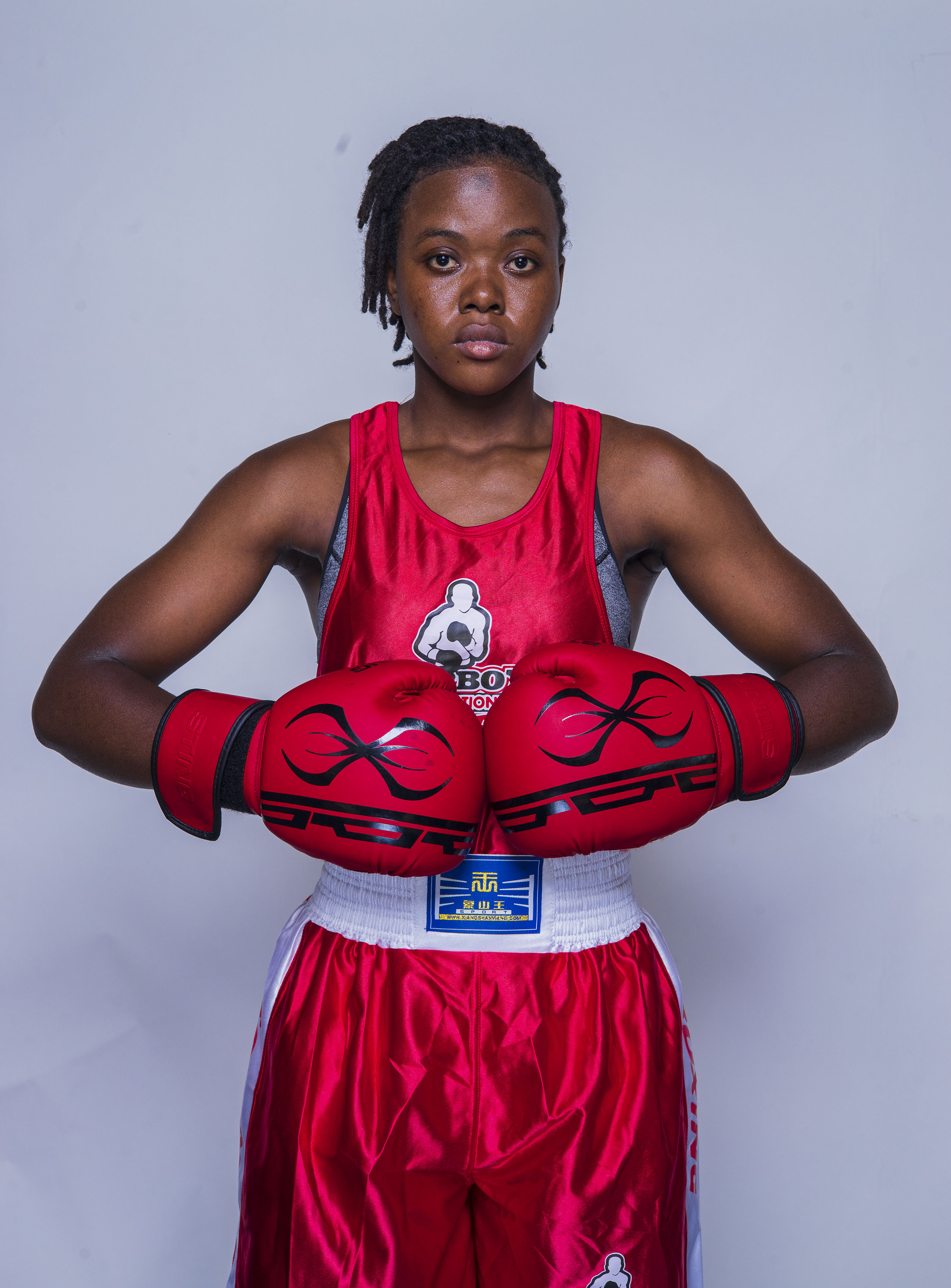

Personal information
- Nationality: Ugandan

Sport
- Weight class: Lightweight

Zahara Nandawula is an Ugandan boxer. She is a lightweight boxer associated with Lukanga boxing club based in Najjanankumbi, Kampala.

== Early life and amateur boxing ==
Nandawula started boxing while at Nsangi High School, where she participated in the National Schools Championships (2017) through Kyengera Boxing Club. She also represented Uganda at the African Championships in Yaoundé, Cameroon.

She was among the athletes recognized in the August 2025 Site Monthly Sports Awards. She competed in the Uganda Boxing Champions League 2024, where she recorded a 4–1 win over Gertrude Naava.

She won a gold medal during the National Schools Championships in 2017, and was a back-to-back gold winner during the National Open Junior Category in 2019.
