= Zara (game) =

Dice game from the Middle Ages

Zara is a game of chance that was played in the Middle Ages.

It was most commonly played with three dice, although there were regional variations. Each player would throw the dice, calling out a number at the same time. If the number he called was not the sum of the dice, he would pay a number of coins equal to the number he called; if the number he called was the sum of the dice, he would collect a number of coins equal to the number called.

== In literature ==
Zara is mentioned by Dante in the Divine Comedy:

Italian Text

Quando si parte il gioco de la zara,
colui che perde si riman dolente,
repetendo le volte, e tristo impara:

con l’altro se ne va tutta la gente;
qual va dinanzi, e qual di dietro il prende,
e qual da lato li si reca a mente:

el non s’arresta, e questo e quello intende;
a cui porge la man, piú non fa pressa,
e cosí da la calca si difende.

English Translation

Whene'er is broken up the game of Zara,
He who has lost remains behind despondent,
The throws repeating, and in sadness learns;

The people with the other all depart;
One goes in front, and one behind doth pluck him,
And at his side one brings himself to mind;

He pauses not, and this and that one hears;
They crowd no more to whom his hand he stretches,
And from the throng he thus defends himself.
