= Sahar Elevated Access Road =

Road in Mumbai, India

- Sahar Elevated Access Road marked in Red on Mumbai area map

Route information
- Maintained by Mumbai International Airport Limited (MIAL)
- Length: 2.2 km (1.4 mi)
- Existed: 12 February 2014–present

Major junctions
- West end: Western Express Highway
- East end: Chhatrapati Shivaji International Airport

Location
- Country: India
- State: Maharashtra
- Major cities: Mumbai

Highway system
- Roads in India; Expressways; National; State; Asian; State Highways in Maharashtra

The Sahar Elevated Access Road, abbreviated to SEAR, is a dedicated, elevated, express access road in Mumbai that connects the Western Express Highway (WEH) near Hanuman Nagar junction in Vile Parle, with the forecourts of Terminal T2 of the Chhatrapati Shivaji Maharaj International Airport. The road improves access and travel times between the WEH and the airport. The 2.2 km long access road has 4 entry and 2 exit points. The road also includes an underpass for vehicles travelling on the WEH and a pedestrian subway; as well as an underpass, a tunnel, and ramps connecting the highway to the terminal which bypasses the congested roadways below.

The corridor was developed by the Mumbai Metropolitan Region Development Authority (MMRDA) under its Mumbai Urban Infrastructure Project (MUIP). The project cost of ₹400.77 crore (US$47 million), approved by the Jawaharlal Nehru National Urban Renewal Mission (JnNURM), was paid by the Central Government, the Government of Maharashtra, the MMRDA, and the Mumbai International Airport Limited (MIAL).

In July 2018, parts of the relatively new road were found damaged with potholes due to poor maintenance and seasonal monsoon rains, resulting in slow traffic.

== Route description ==
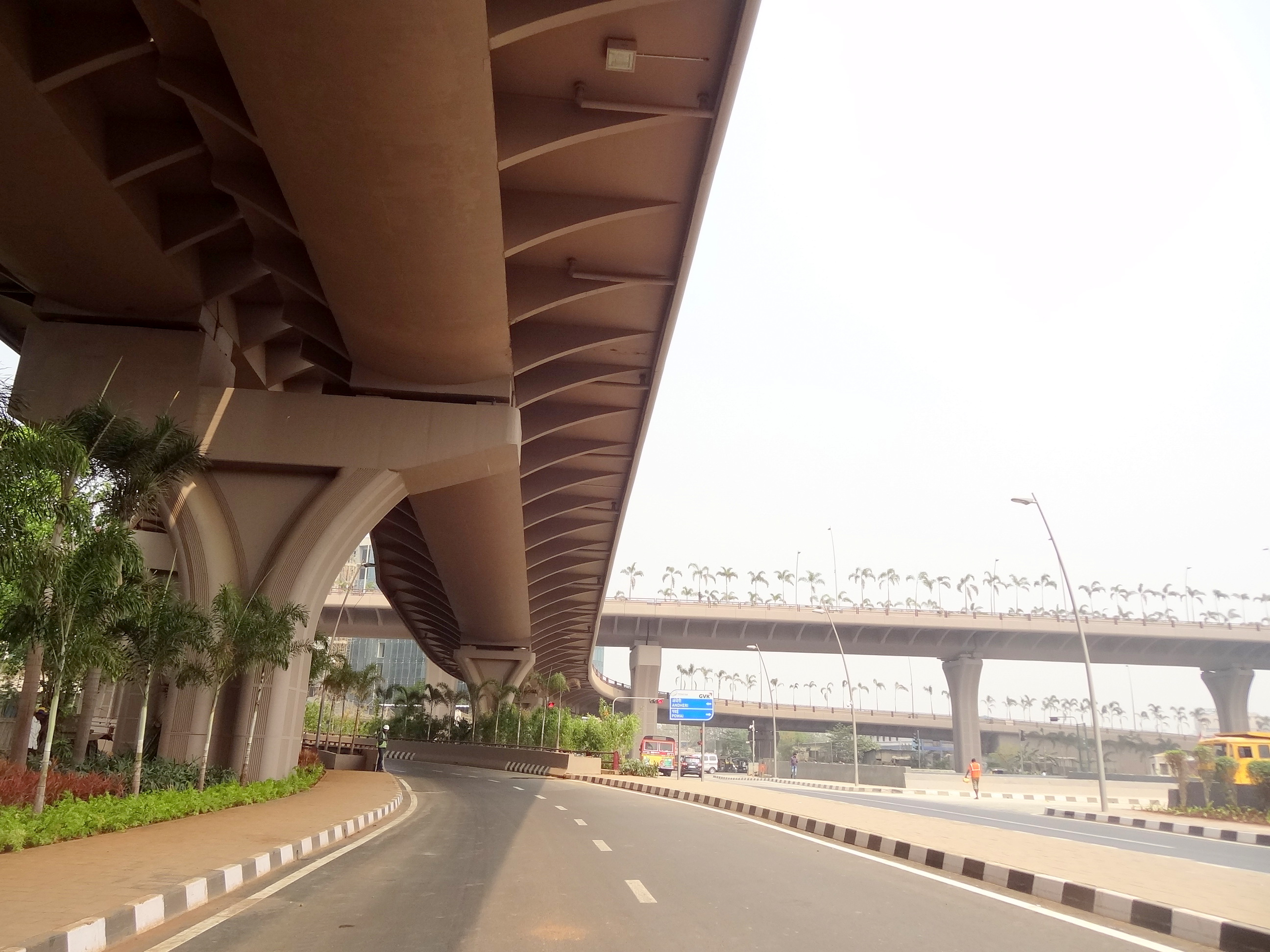
View of SEAR

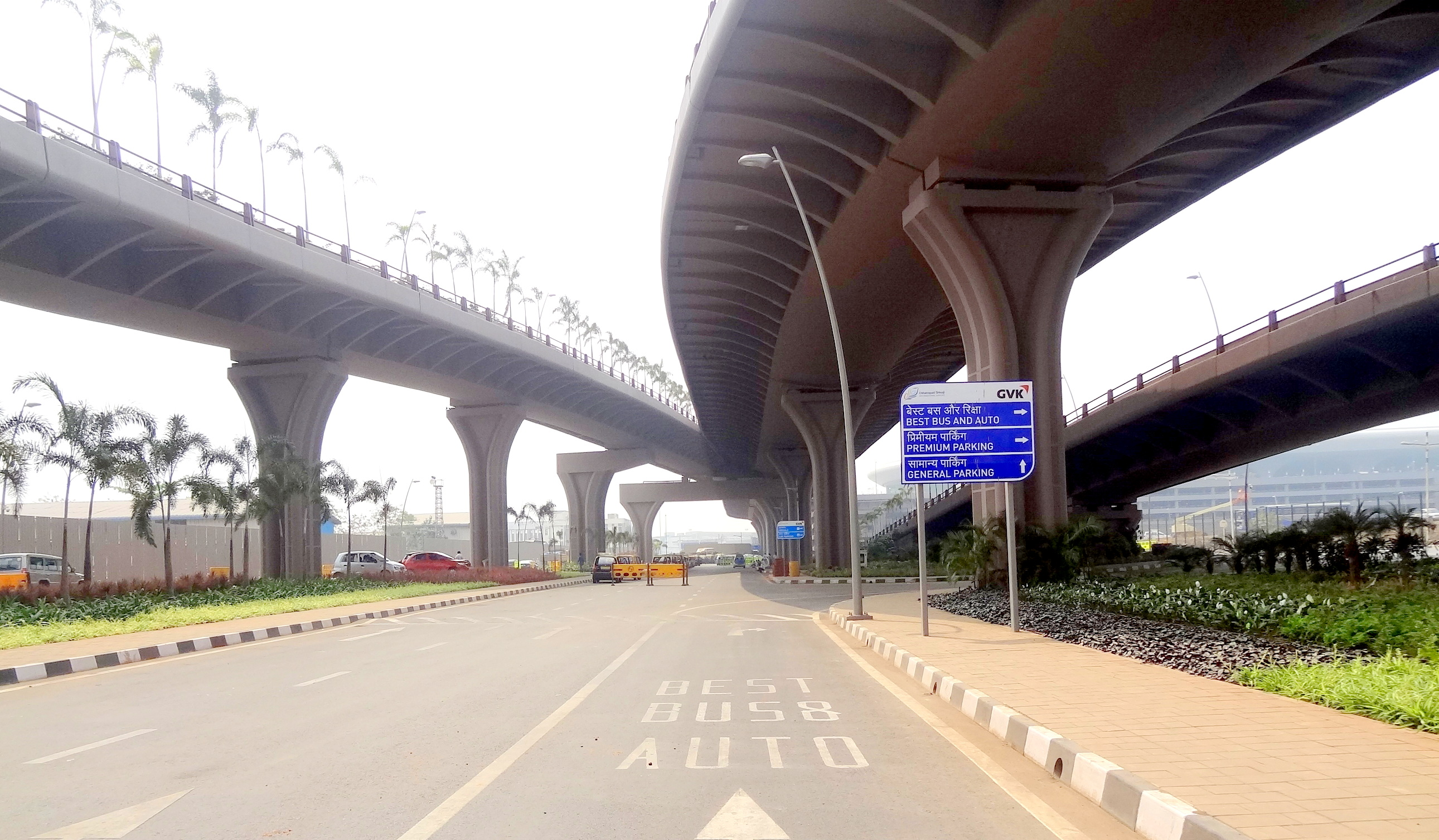
View of SEAR

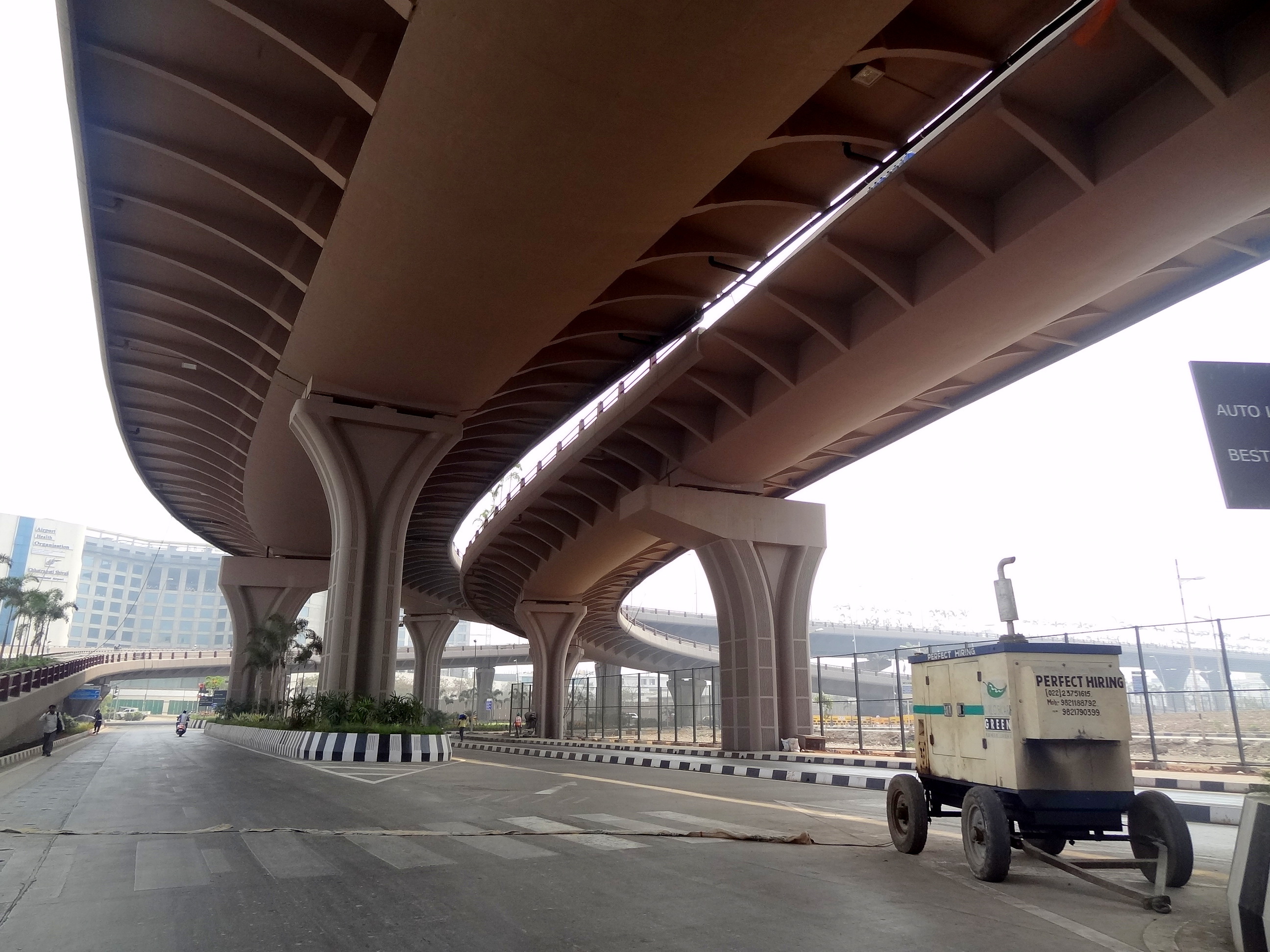
View of SEAR

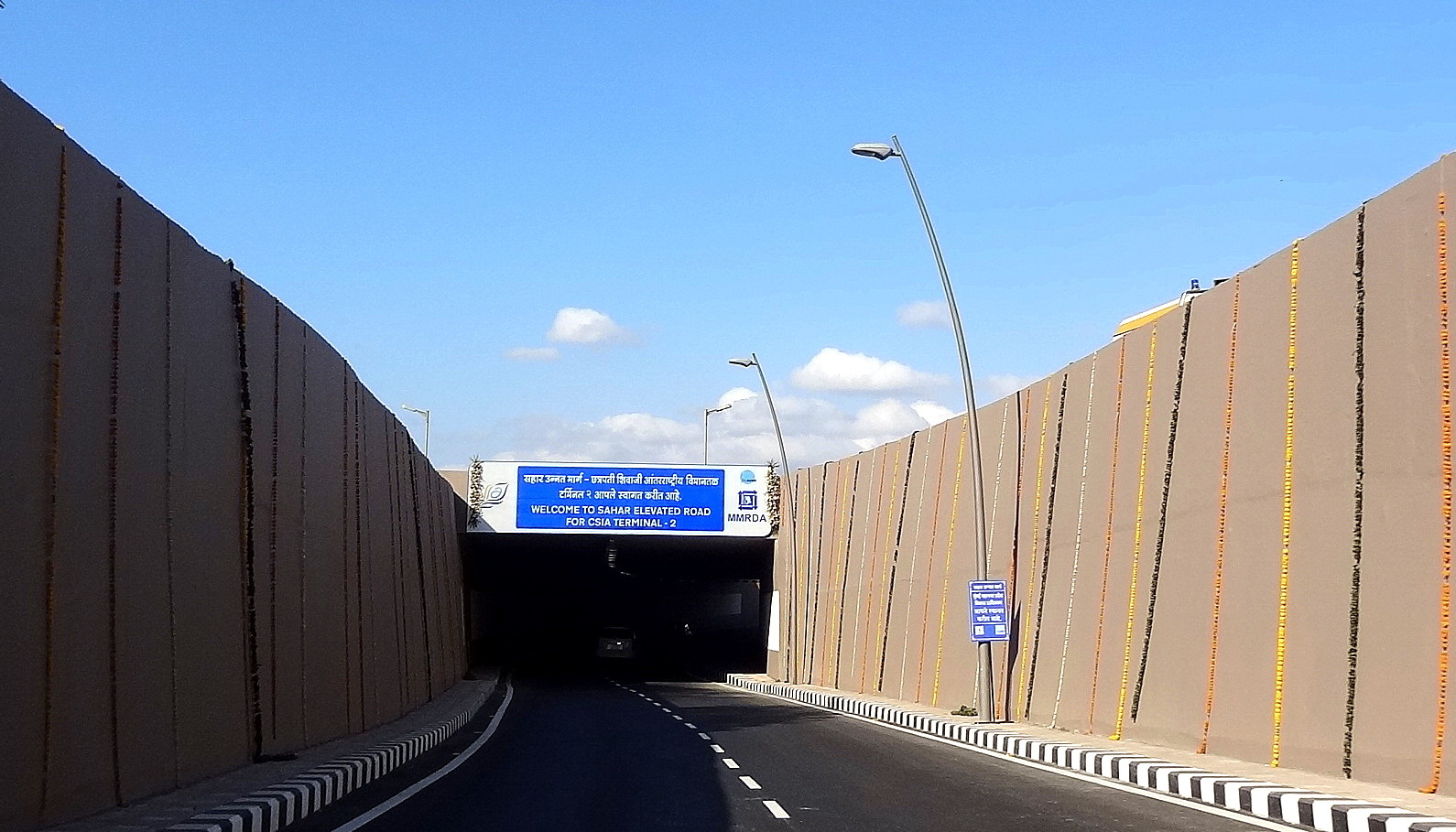
Exit from Western Express Highway

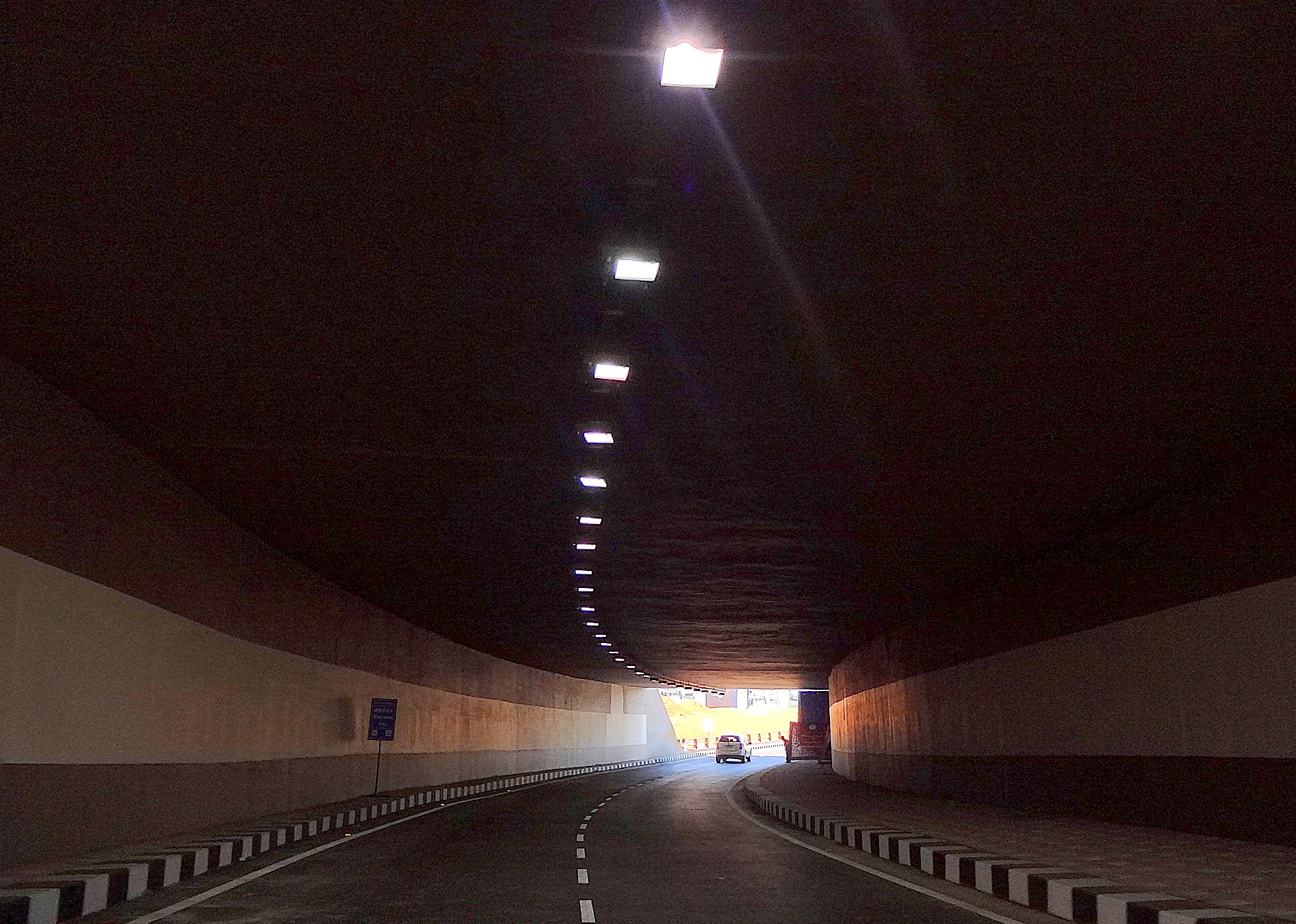
SEAR Inside Tunnel View

The six-lane, signal-free approach road originates near Hanuman Nagar junction in Vile Parle on the Western Express Highway (WEH), and ends at the forecourts of Terminal T2 of the Chhatrapati Shivaji Majaraj International Airport. From the WEH, the road heads east till the elevated section takes it over the Sahar Road. The corridor continues east over the Indian Airlines Project Road till it reaches the current main approach of the International terminal, where the corridor disperses into ramps which lead to the arrival and departure of the Terminal forecourts.

The road is 2.2 km long and has three lanes in each direction. On the WEH end, the project comprises 1,050 metres (3,440 ft) of elevated road, a 98-metre-long (322 ft) tunnel with ramps measuring 261 metres (856 ft), three vehicular underpasses each at 48, 22, and 30 metres (157, 72, and 98 ft), and 641 metres (2,103 ft) of six-lane at-grade roadway. The plan also includes a 48-metre (157 ft) pedestrian underpass on the WEH. The road will also have four ramps measuring 2,200 metres (7,200 ft) on the airport end.

The road reduces travel time from the highway to the airport to five minutes from the 30 to 45 minutes it previously took. For smoother traffic flow, two-wheelers and three-wheelers, including bicycles, are prohibited from entering.

== History ==
=== Background ===
Despite the proposed Terminal 2's proximity with Mumbai's arterial Western Express Highway, commuters approaching the terminal had to travel via the congested roads of eastern Andheri (viz. Sahar Road) before reaching the airport's forecourt. Commuters had to cross Sambhaji Nagar, Rajaram Wadi, NAD Colony, Dr Babasaheb Ambedkar Road, Bamanwada, Sahar Post and Telegraph Colony, GVK Residential Colony and slow-moving traffic on Sahar road to reach the international terminal.

The impending shift of domestic air traffic would also make the situation worse during the daytime and the evening-peak traffic hours. To avoid these traffic bottlenecks, an elevated direct corridor by-passing the crowded Chakala, Sahar Road, and the Jog flyover areas of Andheri (East) was envisioned. The elevated road was constructed to provide direct access to the international terminal, as well as reduce traffic on the WEH, especially at the Andheri-Kurla road junction. The SEAR had a tunnel incorporated into the design; it enables motorists on the WEH to access the SEAR with ease.

=== Construction ===
The project was commissioned in January 2008, and the original deadline for completing the entire project was January 2010.

The corridor was developed by the MMRDA under its Mumbai Urban Infrastructure Project (MUIP) scheme with Jawaharlal Nehru National Urban Renewal Mission (JnNURM) funding. The project was funded by the Central Government, the State Government, the MMRDA, and the Mumbai International Airport Limited (MIAL). The Sahar Elevated Access Road was constructed jointly by the MMRDA and the MIAL. The cost of construction for the MMRDA was ₹377.59 crore (US$45 million), higher than the earlier estimated ₹287.37 crore (US$34 million). The road was built in two parts: the first was a 1.8 km stretch from the WEH to the Hyatt Regency (on Sahar Airport Road), and the second was a 1.5 km stretch from the Hyatt Regency to the airport. The first section cost ₹3.43 billion (US$41 million) and was built by the MMRDA, while the second cost ₹2.27 billion (US$27 million) and was built by MIAL.

The 1,300-metre long elevated road consists of 30 spans of 35-metre-long (115 ft) precast concrete segments erected using a specially fabricated launching girder and strand jack. The pillars measure 2.5 by 2.8 metres (8.2 ft × 9.2 ft) at the base. The 27.6-metre (91 ft) deck superstructure is composed of a 9-metre-wide (30 ft) precast central spine and two 9.3-metre (31 ft) cantilever wings on either side connected to the central spine by concrete stitching and transverse pre-stressing methods. The pedestrian, and two and three-wheeler underpasses on the Western Express Highway were constructed with pre-cast box cells. The approaches on either sides were built with reinforced earth walls. The pedestrian and vehicular underpass on Western Express Highway in Vile Parle is 45 metres long, and the MIAL underpass on Justice MC Chhagla Road is 48 metres long. A 98.5-metre-long (323 ft) tunnel was constructed at the junction of the corridor with the WEH using the cut and cover method with concrete contiguous piles.

The Sahar Elevated Access Road and the new terminal at BOM opened on 12 February 2014.

==== Impediments ====
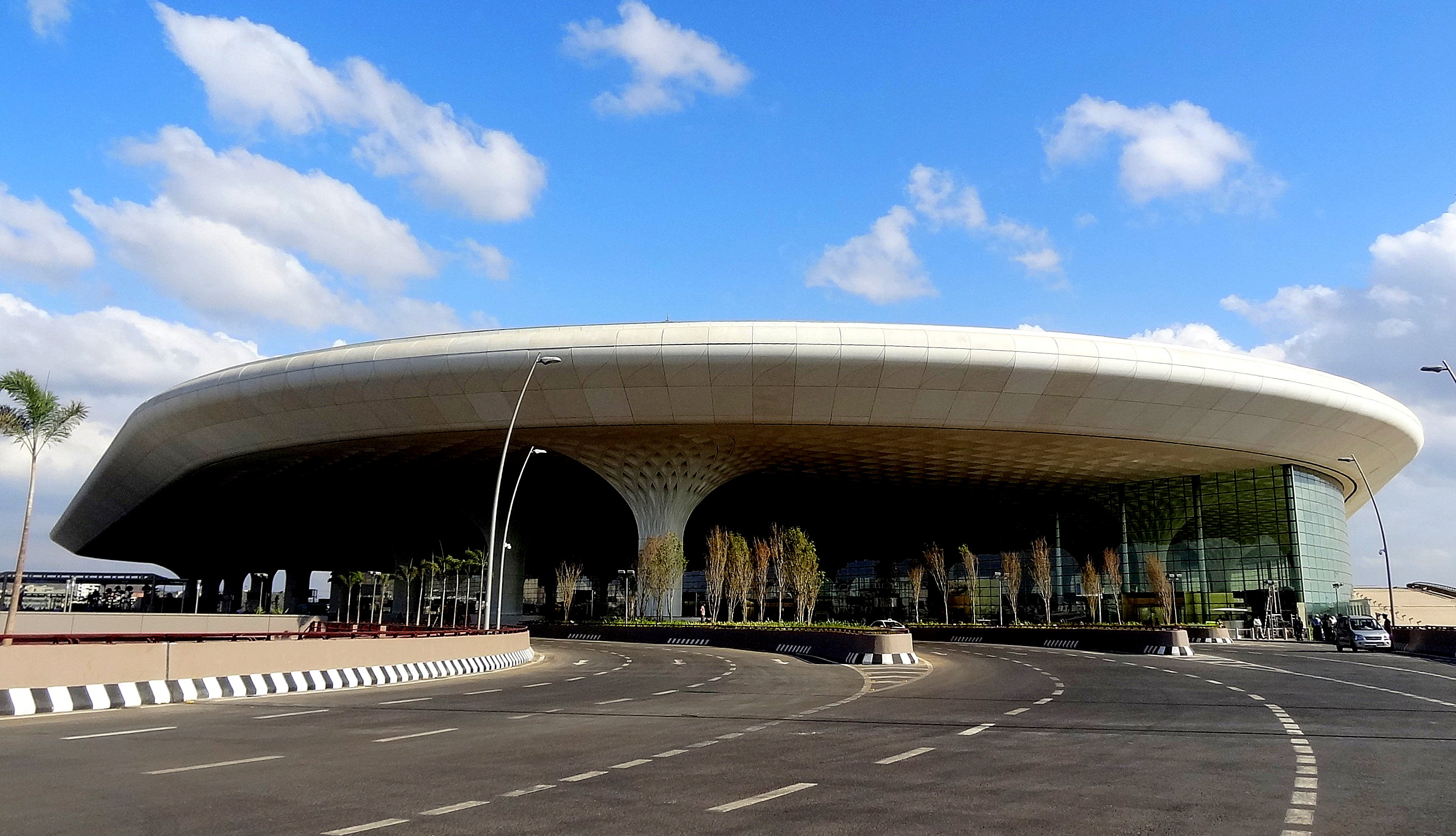
Mumbai Airport's new Terminal 2 (T2) Arrivals section

Carrying out construction activities on one of Mumbai's busiest roads, with minimum interference to traffic, was a major challenge. There was no opportunity for diversion of traffic as the deck-width of the bridge was as wide as the road-width below. Frequent VIP movements accessing the airport further compounded the problem. Also, the corridor passes by the Post & Telegraph colony and a few 5-star hotels which were apprehensive about the project. The issues were sorted through negotiations and environmentally friendly construction practices.

The work on the tunnel at the Western Express Highway end of the corridor was carried out only at night because the location lies within the landing and taking off funnel of the adjacent airport runway. Work at the site was halted several times by the airport authorities due to emergency landings on the runway. Space constraints at the casting yard were dealt with by designing the pre-cast and cantilever segments so they could be stacked in two piers. The pedestrian and vehicular underpasses on the WEH were constructed in planned phases to minimize disturbance to traffic, allowing completion of the project on time.
