= Dola pratha =

Practice of droit du seigneur in India

Dola pratha is a practice of droit du seigneur in India that pushed the new bride to spend her first night with the zamindar.

The accurate period of origin of "Dola pratha" can't be ascertained due to lack of records, but it became a part of "cultural practice", and the landed classes made it their privilege, leading to sexual exploitation of the Shudra girls. In this custom, the newly wed Shudra bride is forced to spend her first night with her local landlord. The word "Dola" literally means Palanquin. The origin of "Dola custom" is traced back to the legend of Mahteen Mata. The existence of a temple of Mahteen Mata in the Shahabad district of Bihar, is testimonial to the existence of this custom.

The story of Mahteen Mata or Ragmati has two different versions, while one is Sanskritic version, the other is Shudra version. According to Sanskritic version of the folklore, a landlord named Ranpal Singh raped Ragmati, a newly wed bride, when her Palanquin was passing through his fiefdom. The poor Ragmati couldn't tolerate the loss of her "dignity", and subsequently committed suicide. The suicide led to tension and in order to avoid punishment, Ranpal Singh spread a false story, that when he was about to touch the women, her body glared and she left for heaven. Thus, according to him, she was a not an ordinary women but a deity.

The Shudra version of the story, however, argue that Ranpal was habitual of raping the Shudra women and molestation of the poor Shudra women was also common for him. Hence, this version contests the story shared by Ranpal. Off late, the sexual availability of the Shudra girls to the landed upper-caste became possible not only through the cultural practices like Dola Pratha, but also by the dominance enjoyed by these caste groups in the rural economic structure. It has been noted that the landed gentry often rape and molest the Shudra women during the festivals like Holi.
