= Zahran (name) =

Zahran (Arabic: زهران, romanized: Zahrān, lit. 'bright' or 'pure') is an Arabic masculine given name and a surname. Notable people with the name include:

== Given name ==
=== First name ===
- Zahran Alloush (1971–2015), Syrian Islamist leader
- Zahran Alqasmi (born 1974), Omani writer
- Zahran Hashim (died 2019), Sri Lankan Islamist leader and suicide bomber

=== Middle name ===
- Faten Zahran Mohammed (born 1955), Egyptian biochemist

== Surname ==
- Amr Zahran (born 2001), Egyptian basketball player
- Bayan Mahmoud Al-Zahran, Saudi Arabian attorney
- Farid Zahran (born 1957), Egyptian politician
- Hassan Zahran (born 1985), Emirati football player
- Mudar Zahran (born 1973), Jordanian-Palestinian writer and activist
- Oday Zahran (born 1991), Jordanian football player
- Sally Zahran (died 2011), Egyptian protester killed by police brutality
- Yasmin Zahran (born 1933), Palestinian archeologist and novelist

== See also ==
- Zohran Mamdani (born 1991), American politician
