= Zarah (entertainer) =

American entertainer, writer, and producer

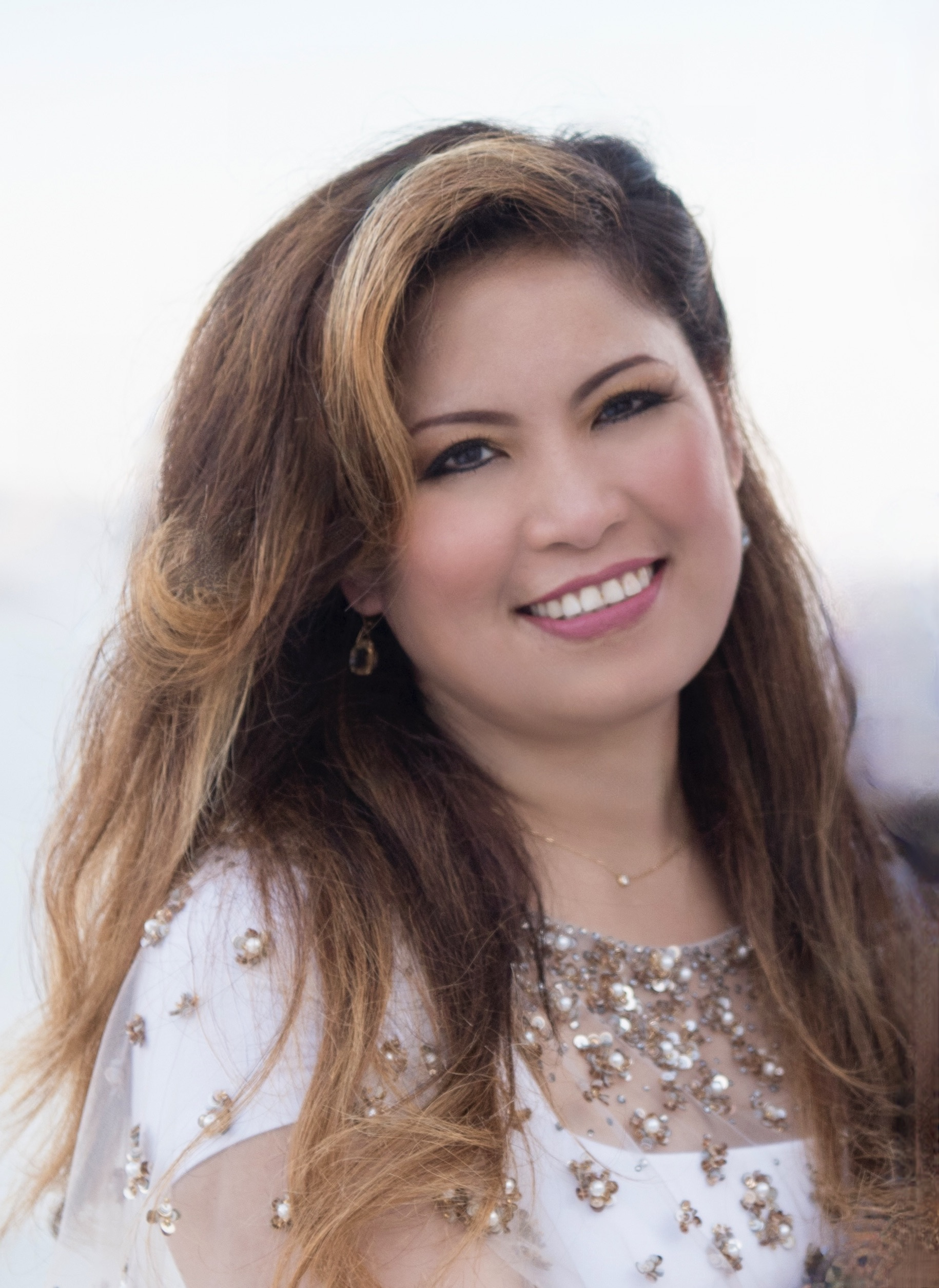
- Recording artist and TV personality Zarah in 2019
- Born: Manila, Philippines
- Other name: Zarah Maillard
- Citizenship: American
- Occupations: Singer; songwriter; novelist; screenwriter; television personality; television producer; executive producer (EP); record producer
- Years active: 2002–present
- Known for: B InTune TV (2005); Diamonds are For Cocktails (2022); Blind Woman (2024)
- Website: zarahrocks.com

Zarah Maillard (born in Manila, Philippines), professionally known as Zarah, is an American singer, songwriter, writer, television personality, and executive producer. She wrote the murder mystery novel Diamonds are For Cocktails that was published in 2022, and in 2023, released her singles including What Have We Become? and Blind Woman she wrote and co-produced from her debut LP of the same title, which became critically acclaimed.

Her earlier work includes performing with the rock band Goo Goo Dolls as a musician. She later hosted the music-based teen show B InTune TV with guest stars including Alicia Keys, Jesse McCartney, Rihanna, Jared Leto, Justin Timberlake, Alanis Morissette, Beyoncé, Led Zeppelin, Clint Eastwood, and the Rolling Stones, broadcasting in 120 million television homes in the United States with broadcast affiliates of 54 countries worldwide including Canada, Europe and Asia that ran for eight seasons.

== Early life ==
Zarah was born in Manila and raised in Los Angeles where she began to pursue her career.

Growing up, music played a huge role in her earlier years as a developing artist, and was largely viewed as an entertainment surrounding her family.

== Television career ==
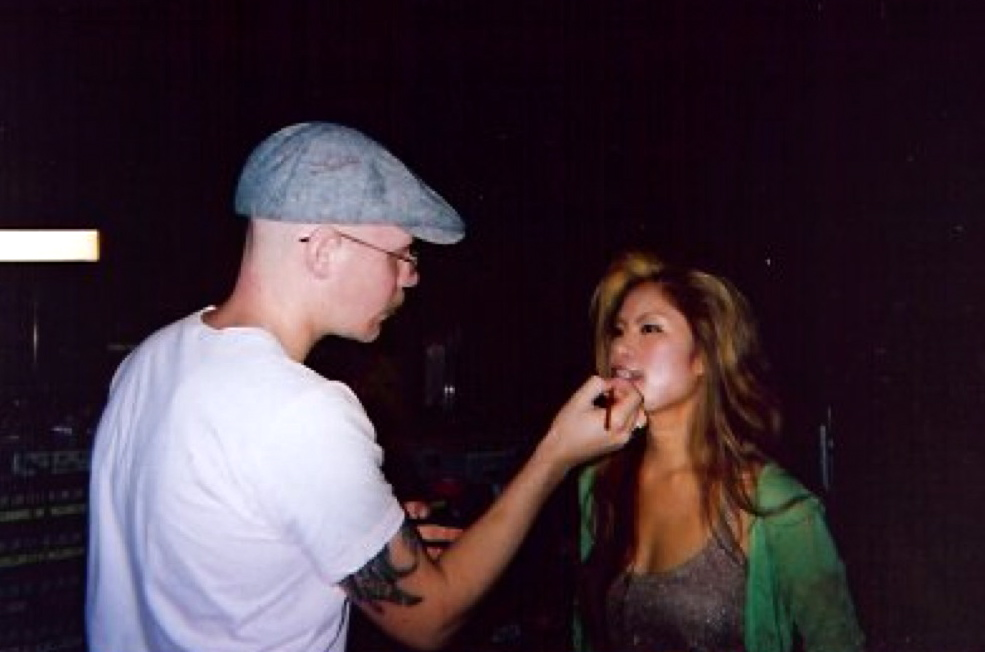
B InTune TV inside a sound stage with the Goo Goo Dolls taping for upcoming episodes: Zarah behind the scenes with her make-up artist.

=== 2005–2012: B InTune TV (TV series) ===
Zarah is best known for her role as the host of B InTune TV, a nationally syndicated daytime television show that teaches and entertains kids between the ages of 13 and 18 years old, which premiered on September 10, 2005, on Viacom and CBS Television Group and UPN Network stations.

Her involvement with non-profits like the Grammy Foundation, which supported music and arts education for children, was the core inspiration behind the show's programming centered on using music as a powerful tool and popular artists to help educate while she entertains simultaneously as the host of the show. During her interview, she told Charley Daniels of Television Week magazine, "I think music has healed a lot of my past." Zarah eventually became the co-executive producer (EP) and the contributing writer of B InTune TV.

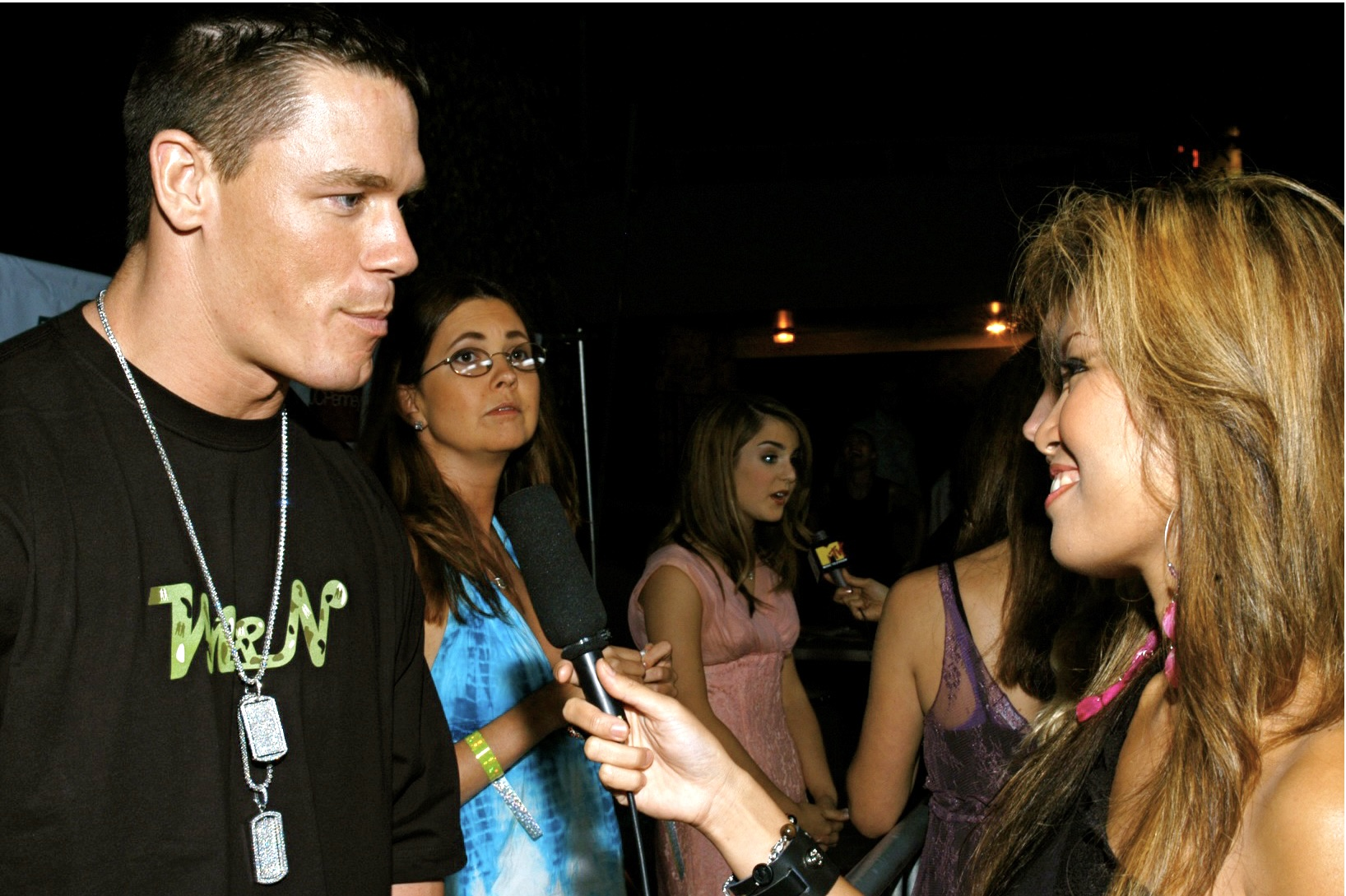
TV personality Zarah interviewing John Cena at the Hope Rocks benefit concert on September 3, 2005, in Hollywood, CA

In 2007, Zarah covered an hour-long television special in B InTune TV introducing the iconic rock and roll band Led Zeppelin and their history and accomplishments following their reunion on December 10, 2007, at the O2 Arena in London where she attended the historic Ahmet Ertegun Tribute Concert of the band attributed to the late music executive Ahmet Ertegun. She featured other guest appearances in other episodes including Rihanna, Justin Timberlake, Beyoncé, Jared Leto, Clint Eastwood and the Rolling Stones just to name a few. The show was supported by B InTune TV's industry partners like Warner Bros. Records and Where Music Meets Film at the Sundance Film Festival in Park City, Utah and several major record label giants like Universal Records, Warner Bros. Records and Capitol Records.

B InTune TV reached 120 million households in the United States from the 60 million homes since its premiere covering 130 U.S. television markets, which was renewed for eight seasons and had a growth of 54 international countries from its broadcast affiliates worldwide. Zarah attended B InTune TV’s red carpet event which was held at the Viper Room in Hollywood, commemorating its success.

== Other guest appearances discography ==
Artists	Legends	Actors
Coldplay	Led Zeppelin	Cuba Gooding, Jr.
Goo Goo Dolls	John Lennon	Hilary Duff
Alicia Keys	The Beatles	Vanessa Hudgens
Beyoncé Knowles	Chuck Berry	Jared Leto
John Mayer	Little Richard	Daisy Fuentes
Justin Timberlake	The Who	Tia Mowry
Janet Jackson	Paul Simon	Amanda Michalka
Bon Jovi	Meat Loaf	Alyson Michalka
Joss Stone	Bill Haley and the Comets	Shirley Jones
Dixie Chicks	Elvis Presley	Tamera Mowry
Mariah Carey	Yoko Ono	Seth Riggs
Alanis Morissette	Frankie Lymon	Paris Hilton
Jesse McCartney	Styx	Cher
Nickel Creek	Louis Armstrong	
Relient K	Peter, Paul and Mary	
JoJo	Brian Wilson	
Kyle Eastwood	Carly Simon	
Hope Partlow	Iron Butterfly	
Chingy	Christopher Cross	
Plain White T's	Dave Grusin	
Korn	Lamont Dozier	
OK Go	Moonglows	
Ashlee Simpson	John Coltrane	
Yellowcard		
Brooke Hogan		
Corrine Bailey Rae		
Gorillaz		
Snoop Dogg		

=== Other television shows ===
Zarah appeared as an actress in other popular television shows.

== Music career ==
=== Album launch ===
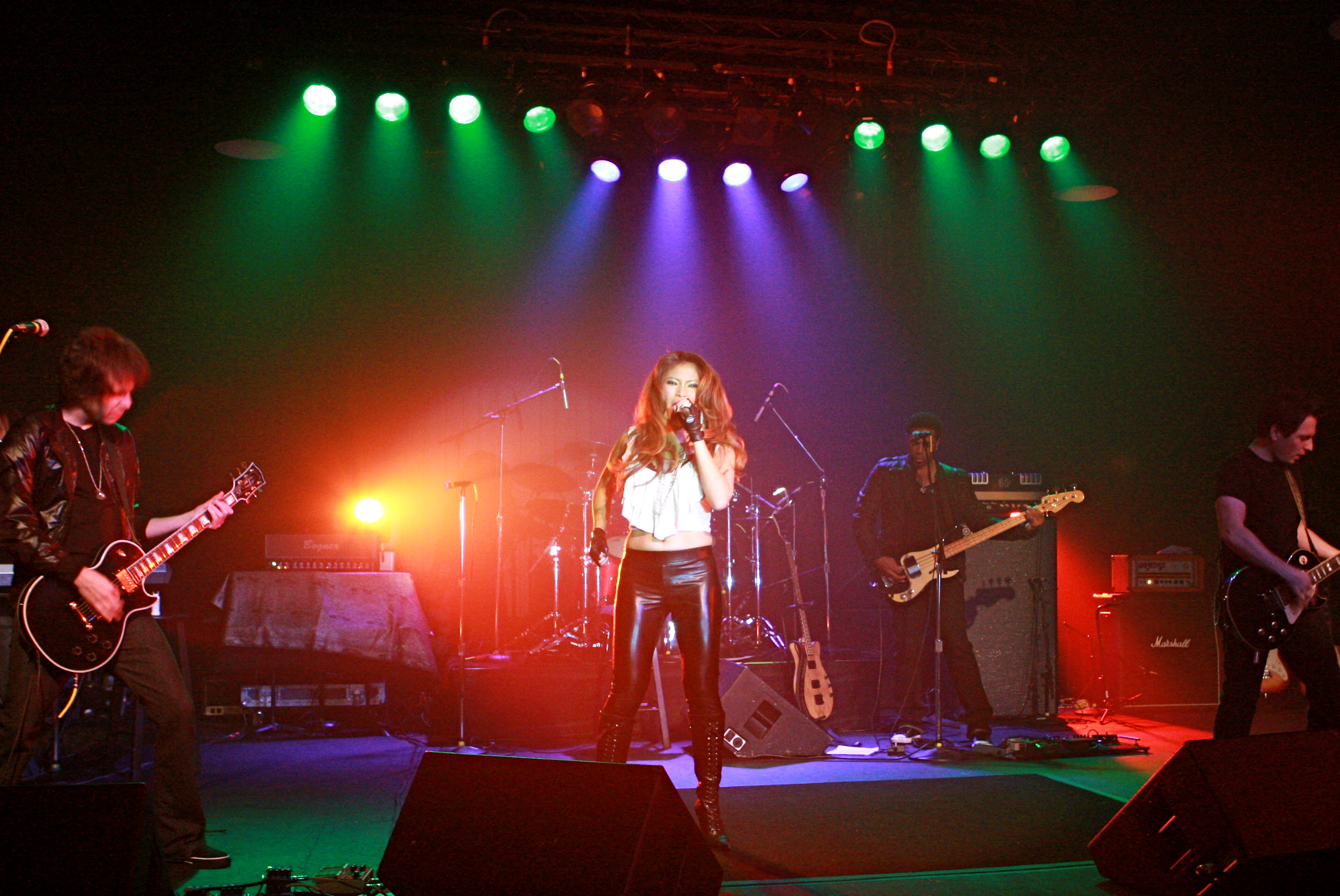
Recording artist Zarah performs live at S.I.R. Hollywood, CA.

In 2023, Zarah's recordings of her studio album with diverse musicians like bassist Chris Chaney of the alternative rock band Jane’s Addiction and bassist for Alanis Morissette's Jagged Little Pill album tour and the Los Angeles Philharmonic orchestra recorded in her lead ballad, was in its completion. Critically acclaimed singles entitled What Have We Become?, Blind Woman, and Guardians Of Our Dreams were released worldwide from her debut studio album Blind Woman.

She wrote, arranged, and co-produced the album at the Henson Recording Studios, formerly known as the A&M Studios in Hollywood, California. The record was engineered by Julian Chan and mix engineer by engineer Mark Needham and remastered at the McCartney Studios in Los Angeles.

Years earlier, Zarah performed live with guitarist and producer Devin Bronson and invited aspiring young musicians to attend. Adam Gaynor, a former band member of Matchbox 20 hosted and introduced her at the show. Fender and Where Music Meets Film at the Sundance Film Festival were among who sponsored the jam-packed event.

=== Influences and style ===
Zarah was influenced by classic to modern rock genres and other popular music growing up. She worked with vocal coach Seth Riggs in Hollywood and began to venture into songwriting.

Since then, she worked with bassist Ricky Phillips of Bad English (now a Styx member), and lead guitarist Howard Leese from Heart, and on various music projects including with the Goo Goo Dolls.

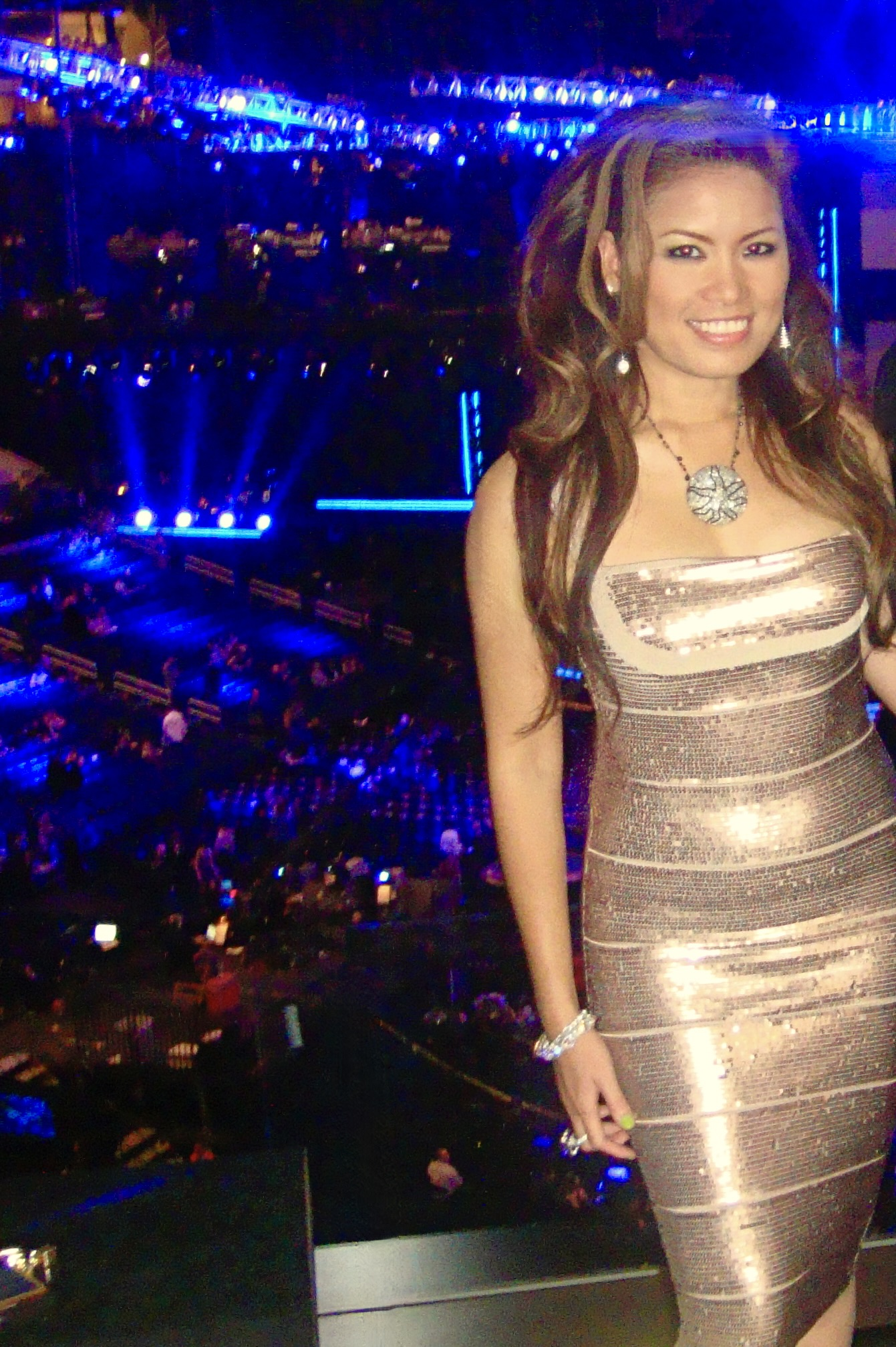
Zarah at the 54th Annual GRAMMY Awards at Staples Center, Los Angeles, CA.

=== Goo Goo Dolls ===
Zarah's notable performances include concert shows with Goo Goo Dolls across the country. Her first performance with the band took place at the 9:30 Club concert venue in Washington, D.C. known for its gold standard for rock clubs. Subsequently, Zarah met with members of the United States Congress which included United States Senator John Breaux at the Capitol Hill with John Rzeznik, lobbying on issues like music piracy which was prevalent in the music industry. She later performed with the Goo Goo Dolls in other locations like Los Angeles, CA.

In 2006, Zarah featured the Goo Goo Dolls in B InTune TV as her guest stars following them behind the scenes while filming one of the popular television segments How to Launch a Major Rock Concert. She conducted many interviews with the band and their crew members during rehearsal for their upcoming tour.

=== Events and projects ===
Zarah worked on a children's project with rock band U2 in association with the Grammy Foundation where selected local high schools were invited to join in during their soundcheck, and spent time with Bono and bassist Adam Clayton in one of their concert tours in Boston, Massachusetts including co-hosting the B InTune Radio with U2 at 30 chronicling the history of the band for 30 years. In her interview, she expressed how "being able to help educate and entertain teens both at the same time is very powerful."

== Writing career ==
Prior to her novel, Zarah was credited as a contributing writer for the popular weekly television series B InTune TV. She wrote the mystery thriller Diamonds are For Cocktails that included true-to-life characters including H.S.H. Prince Albert II, the reigning monarch of the Principality of Monaco where it mostly takes place and the memories of renowned French chef Paul Bocuse, and British actor Sir Roger Moore

Diamonds are For Cocktails was inspired by the French Riviera's beauty and elegance but mainly the decadence of the 'rich and famous' lifestyle while mysteries unravel along the way that reflected many of her classic film influences and traveling experience.

In 2022, upon the release of her book, Diamonds are For Cocktails received an endorsement from Fox News.

== Awards and recognition ==
Zarah is an advocate for advancing music and arts education for youth. Throughout her career, she has championed edutainment and inspired teens through her various media platforms and was recognized for her work. She has supported a variety of music projects for children lending her talents and skills in all aspects of the entertainment industry and continues to dedicate herself towards similar causes.

== Entrepreneurship ==
In 2011, Zarah designed her first couture gown she wore at the 53rd Annual Grammy Awards. Her evening ensemble was covered in many Grammy red carpet arrival articles that included Los Angeles Times, Chicago Tribune and many other celebrity-driven news such as Life and MSN.
