= Chauthia =

Village in Kendujhar district, Odisha, India

Coordinates: 21.933258°N 85.627730°E

Chauthia is a village located in Jhumpura Block of Kendujhar district in Odisha, India.

At the 2001 Census of India, the village had a population of 892 (451 males, 441 females). Nearby villages include Rimuli, Badanai, Asanpat, Karanjia, and Baruna. The PIN Code of Chauthia is 758044 and its postal head office is Karanjia (Kendujhar).
