= Sahar, Bihar =

Sahar सहार
- Village
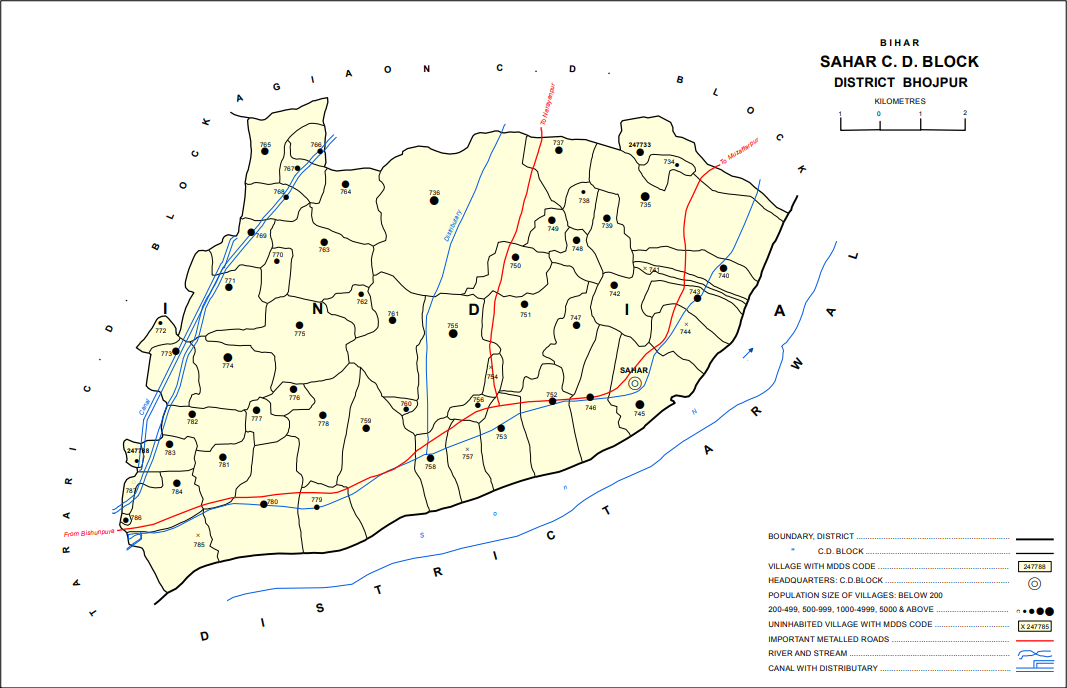
- Map of Sahar block

- Location in Bihar, India Sahar (India)
- Coordinates: 25.24877°N 84.62535°E
- Country: India
- State: Bihar
- District: Bhojpur

Area
  - Total: 120.74 km^{2} (46.62 sq mi)

Population (2011)
  - Total: 5,674
  - Density: 46.99/km^{2} (121.7/sq mi)

Languages
  - Official: Bhojpuri, Hindi
- Time zone: UTC+5:30 (IST)
- PIN: 802208

Sahār (Hindi: सहार) is Gram Panchayat and community development block in Bhojpur district of Bihar, India. The sub-district contains 51 inhabited villages, including that of Sahar itself, with a total district population of 110,276 as of 2011. The village of Sahar has a population of 5,674, in 931 households. Sahar was a major center of conflict during the wider Naxalite insurgency in Bhojpur in the late 1960s and throughout the 1970s.

== Geography ==
The sub-district of Sahar lies in the southeastern part of Bhojpur, on the Arrah plains. It is bordered by the sub-districts of Tarari to the west, Charpokhari to the northwest, and Agiaon to the northeast. On the southern and eastern sides of the district, the Son River forms the border with Arwal district. The village of Sahar itself lies on the north bank of the Son.

=== Climate ===
Sahar has a Köppen climate classification of Cwa, indicating a dry-winter humid subtropical climate. The average rainfall in Sahar is 983 mm (38.70 in) per year. January is the coldest month of the year. In mid-March, increased wind and occasional dust storms mark the beginning of summer, and temperatures rise, reaching their peak in May. In late June, the monsoon rains arrive, marking the end of summer and the beginning of the rainy season, which lasts through September. Although temperatures fall during these months, the accompanying rise in humidity often makes the heat feel more unpleasant than the raw temperature would otherwise suggest. By mid-October, after the end of the rainy season, a cool and pleasant winter begins, and temperatures continue to drop until the end of the calendar year.

Climate data for Sahar
| Month | Jan | Feb | Mar | Apr | May | Jun | Jul | Aug | Sep | Oct | Nov | Dec | Year |
|---|---|---|---|---|---|---|---|---|---|---|---|---|---|
| Mean daily maximum °C (°F) | 23.8 (74.8) | 27 (81) | 33.5 (92.3) | 37.2 (99.0) | 40.7 (105.3) | 38 (100) | 33.4 (92.1) | 32.2 (90.0) | 32.3 (90.1) | 32 (90) | 28.9 (84.0) | 25.2 (77.4) | 32.0 (89.7) |
| Mean daily minimum °C (°F) | 11.1 (52.0) | 13.7 (56.7) | 18.7 (65.7) | 23.8 (74.8) | 27.1 (80.8) | 27.7 (81.9) | 26.5 (79.7) | 26.3 (79.3) | 25.8 (78.4) | 22.4 (72.3) | 15.5 (59.9) | 11.6 (52.9) | 20.9 (69.5) |
| Average precipitation mm (inches) | 19 (0.7) | 5 (0.2) | 7 (0.3) | 3 (0.1) | 11 (0.4) | 104 (4.1) | 286 (11.3) | 287 (11.3) | 207 (8.1) | 48 (1.9) | 5 (0.2) | 1 (0.0) | 983 (38.7) |
Source: climate-data.org

== History ==
In the 1960s, as part of the broader Green Revolution the Intensive Area Development Project targeted Bhojpur district, and particularly the Sone Canal, for agricultural development. Sahar, called "the model block of Bhojpur" by Kalyan Mukherjee and Rajendra Singh Yadav, benefited greatly from this development. Peasants came to own tractors, and literacy rates markedly increased. A saying of Sahar peasants at the time illustrates the improvement in standard of living at the time: "Sahar Haryana ban gaya hai. Yaha koi admi bhook se naha marta." (In English, "Sahar has become Haryana. No one dies of hunger here.")

However, caste-based tensions continued, causing significant unrest among lower-caste members. Corrupt upper-caste Bhumihar landlords would coerce lower-caste women who worked their lands into having sex with them; they also paid insufficient wages to their workers. These grievances led many peasants to gravitate towards socialism and particularly Naxalism.

Although the grievances of the rural lower castes in Bhojpur were longstanding, the direct catalyst of the Bhojpur insurgency came during the 1967 Indian general election, when the Socialist politician Jagdish Mahto was attacked by upper-caste landlords in the village of Ekwari, in Sahar block. In the following years, Sahar block became a hotbed of conflict. In 1970, the government of Bihar reported 26 murders and 9 dacoities that had been committed by Naxalites in the state, and in response strengthened the powers of the police department to deal with the Naxalites. However, the Naxalbari uprising in 1967 had drawn public attention away from the unrest in Bhojpur, so the district in particular was mostly ignored until 1973.

On 6 May 1973, a violent clash broke out between police and local peasants at the village of Chauri, in Sahar block. An armed police posse arrived during the morning to arrest people suspected of stealing grain from a visiting trader. After encountering resistance from groups of farm workers, who declared that they would not allow any searches or arrests on their property, the police opened fire. Four villagers were killed, and nineteen of the policemen were injured. 36 people were arrested.

The Chauri incident drew media attention to the Naxalite movement in Bhojpur for the first time.

1975 was the bloodiest year of the Bhojpur insurgency. In Sahar, there were violent encounters at the villages of Dullamchak on 14 April, Bahuara on 2 July, and Bahubandh on 28 November. In 1977, landlords in the Sahar village of Gurpa killed several Harijans, accusing them of being Naxalites.

In late 1977 and early 1978, members of the Bhojpur chapter of the Sangharsh Vahini visited three villages (Dullamchak, Bansidehri, and Bargaon) in Sahar block. They later published a report on their findings, and included a list of proposed reforms for the district's peasants:. The items included distribution of gairmazarua (common) land among landless peasants, distribution of surplus land according to the Ceilings Act, peaceful resolution of wage disputes, establishment of local industries to supplement incomes for agricultural labourers, lifting of restrictions preventing Harijans from entering temples, and the removal of thanas and police camps from the villages.

Also in 1978, Karpoori Thakur, then Chief Minister of Bihar, assembled a four-man committee to investigate the Naxalite movement in Sahar. Results were published in August of that year. The report noted a recalcitrant mood in the surveyed villages of Karbasin and Korandehri and concluded that the movement consisted of lower-caste members retaliating against upper-caste ones for years of exploitation and injustice.

In November and December 1978, there were attacks on members of the Ahir community who were seen as collaborators with Bhumihar and Rajput landlords in the village of Newada, in Sahar block. Indian intelligence personnel viewed this as an important indicator of the class-based nature of the unrest in Bhojpur at the time.

== Demographics ==
=== Sub-district ===
In 2001, the population of Sahar block was 99,585; this increased to 110,276 in 2011, an increase of 10.7%. This percent increase was the lowest among sub-districts in Bhojpur district during this period. In both Census years, Sahar was classified as an entirely rural sub-district, with no urban centers. The largest village was Ekwari, with a population of 11,561.

The sex ratio of Sahar block in 2011 was 966 females to every 1000 males. This was the most even ratio among all sub-districts in Bhojpur (the average ratio was 907). Among the 0–6 age group, the sex ratio was slightly higher, at 971 females for every 1000 males; this ratio was also the highest among Bhojpur's sub-districts, where the average was 918.

In 2011, 22,826 people, or 20.7% of the sub-district's population, belonged to scheduled castes in Sahar block. This was slightly higher than the average of 15.59% in all of Bhojpur district. There were only 75 members of scheduled tribes in the block, or 0.07% of the population, which was slightly lower than the 0.51% in all of Bhojpur district.

In 2011, the total literacy rate of Sahar block was 67.09%, which was slightly below the Bhojpur district average of 69.16%. In the block, 79.77% of men and 53.95% of women could read and write. The gender gap in literacy was 25.82%, which was about average for the district as a whole.

The primary means of employment for Sahar block's workers in 2011 was agriculture, with over 80% of the population engaged in some form of agricultural work. 29.03% of workers were cultivators who owned or leased their own land, and 52.39% were agricultural labourers who worked someone else's land for wages. Both percentages were somewhat higher than the averages for all of Bhojpur district (23% and 44%, respectively). Household industry workers constituted 3.32% of Sahar block's workforce, and all other workers made up the remaining 15.26%.

86.0% of the total land area in Sahar block was under cultivation in 2011. Of the land under cultivation, 93.53% was irrigated, which was the highest percentage in Bhojpur district.

Of the 51 inhabited villages in Sahar sub-district in 2011, all had access to clean drinking water, and 47 had schools. 14 had medical facilities, 17 had post offices, 9 had telephone access, 18 had transport communications (bus, rail, or navigable waterways), 8 had banks, 21 had pucca roads, and 3 had electrical power. Only one village, that of Sahar, had an agricultural credit society. Sahar block had the lowest proportion of villages with telephone service (17.65%) among sub-districts of Bhojpur (where the average was 54.76%). The proportion of villages with pucca roads, 41.18%, was also the lowest in Bhojpur, where the average was 70.61%. The proportion of villages with electricity was 5.88% in Sahar block, which was the second-lowest among sub-districts in Bhojpur, where the average was 42.13%; only Agiaon had a lower proportion of villages with electricity. Additionally, only two villages (Ekwari and Fatehpur) had Internet access in Sahar block in 2011.

=== Village of Sahar ===
The village of Sahar covered an area of 355 hectares and had a population of 5,674 in 2011. It had one each of a pre-primary school, primary school, middle school, secondary school, and senior secondary school, but did not have any form of post-secondary school. There was one community healthcare centre in the village, and two practitioners of traditional medicine. The village had access to tap water, but did not have public toilets. There was a post office. The village had bus service and use of automobiles and tractors, as well as a river ferry service, but no railway station. The town had pucca roads, which were not connected to national highways, although they were connected to state highways. Sahar had a bank with an ATM, as well as the only agricultural credit society in the sub-district. There was a mandi, or regular market open daily, as well as a weekly haat market. The village had newspaper distribution but it did not have a public library or any sort of electricity.

== List of Villages ==
The Sahar block contains 51 inhabited villages and 5 uninhabited ones, a total of 56 villages: (GP = Gram Panchayat)

| Village name | Total land area (hectares) | Population (in 2011) |
|---|---|---|
| Abgila | 277 | 2,845 |
| Amruhan (GP) | 378 | 3,227 |
| Andhari (GP) | 252 | 3,140 |
| Andhari Mahazi | 242 | 0 |
| Anuwa | 200 | 1,884 |
| Athpa | 155 | 1,112 |
| Bagaunti | 117 | 916 |
| Bahuara | 144 | 1,605 |
| Bajrean | 253 | 2,160 |
| Bansi Dehri | 175 | 1,472 |
| Baruhi (GP) | 753 | 7,021 |
| Bhopatpur | 17 | 52 |
| Bishunpura | 83 | 450 |
| Chak Chaudhari | 402 | 2,309 |
| Chauri (GP) | 314 | 2,228 |
| Chhatarpura | 85 | 1,524 |
| Dehri | 226 | 2,452 |
| Dhanchhuhan (GP) | 434 | 3,885 |
| Dharampur | 185 | 1,013 |
| Dhauri | 61 | 1,724 |
| Dhauri Chak | 162 | 0 |
| Ekwari (GP) | 1,275 | 11,561 |
| Fatehpur | 511 | 1,859 |
| Gulzarpur (GP) | 411 | 3,806 |
| Harpur | 32 | 714 |
| Hatimganj | 58 | 717 |
| Inurkhi | 218 | 2,492 |
| Jagdish Chak | 34 | 0 |
| Janaidih | 25 | 468 |
| Janpuria | 176 | 1,287 |
| Jot Gobind | 25 | 0 |
| Kanpahari | 98 | 572 |
| Karbasin | 284 | 1,977 |
| Kaul Dehri (GP) | 312 | 5,470 |
| Khaira | 244 | 1,827 |
| Kharaon Buzurg | 325 | 2,613 |
| Kharaon Chaturbhuj (GP) | 562 | 2,521 |
| Koni | 90 | 597 |
| Koriar | 104 | 783 |
| Kunrwa | 77 | 463 |
| Kusiar | 256 | 3,007 |
| Lodipur | 230 | 784 |
| Mahabirganj | 51 | 457 |
| Mathurapur | 208 | 1,328 |
| Newada | 158 | 2,005 |
| Nima | 76 | 569 |
| Ojhaulia | 96 | 1,030 |
| Patarpura | 86 | 1,000 |
| Patrihan | 84 | 1,570 |
| Perhap (GP) | 520 | 5,285 |
| Peur | 203 | 2,080 |
| Peur Chak | 189 | 0 |
| Purhara | 214 | 1,801 |
| Sahar (GP & Block headquarters) | 355 | 5,674 |
| Sakhuana | 34 | 888 |
| Shiw Chak | 81 | 2,105 |
