= Rimuli =

Village in Champua block, Kendujhar district, Odisha, India

Coordinates: 21.955541°N 85.589397°E

Rimuli is a village located in Champua block, Kendujhar district in Odisha, India.

It is located 39 kilometres north of Kendujhar, main town of the district, 15 kilometres from the subdivision headquarters Champua and 221 kilometres from the State capital Bhubaneswar. Chauthia, Badanai, Balibandha, Gundunia and Rajia are the neighbouring villages of Rimuli.

The village has a population of 4,558, of whom 2,278 are males and 2,280 are females.
