= Ekwari =

- Village
- Nickname: Ekwari
- Location in Bihar, India Ekwari (India)
- Coordinates: 25.297513°N 84.499390°E
- Country: India
- State: Bihar
- District: Bhojpur
- Elevation: 74 m (243 ft)

Languages
  - Official: Bhojpuri, Hindi
- Time zone: UTC+5:30 (IST)
- PIN: 802208
- Telephone code: 91-6337
- Vehicle registration: BR-03

Ekwari is a village in the Sahar Block of the Bhojpur district in the Indian state of Bihar. Bhojpur district is a part of the Patna division.

== Surroundings ==
Ekwari is on the district border and adjacent to Arwal district to the southeast and Patna district to the northeast. It is 35 km south of the district headquarters in Arrah, 7 km from Sahar and the Sone River. It is 76 km southwest of state capital Patna.

Villages near Ekwari include Baruna (3 km) to the north, Babu Bandh (5 km), Perhap (5 km) to the south, Koran Dihari (6 km) and Baruhi (6 km). Kosiyar (2km) to the west, The village is surrounded by the Agiaon block to the north, the Arwal block to the east, the Charpokhari block to the west and the Garhani block towards north.

Cities near Ekwari include Agion, arwal, Piro, Arrah, Jagdispur and Behea.

== Infrastructure ==
The Sakhuana canal passes through the village.

== Demographics ==
Ekwari has a population of 11,561, in 1,877 families, of which 5,976 are male and 5,585 are female according to the census conducted in India (2011).

The average sex ratio is 935 women per 1,000 men, a little higher than the Bihar state average of 918. The child sex ratio is 973, also higher than the Bihar average of 935. The 2011 Census indicates that 2,111 children ages 0–6 live there. This is 18.26% of the population.

In 2011, the literacy rate was 72.98% compared to 61.80% of the state. Literacy varies by gender, as the male literacy rate is 81.63%, while the female rate is 63.64%. This is above standard in the Bihar state.

As per constitution of India and Panchyati Raj Act, the village is administrated by the Sarpanch (Head of Village), the elected representative of village.

Scheduled Castes (SC) constitute 15.14%, while Scheduled Tribes (ST) made up 0.01%.

== Visiting Places ==
Budhiya mai temple. Mosque in Chika. Bramhsthan.Natural scenery at Amolabagh.this is one of the biggest Lake in ara district ( largest), Nagraaj water reservoir ( during July-Oct). Forest at the west bank of Nagraaj water reservoir.

== Economy ==
3,959 of the population are engaged in work activities. 59.61% of the labor force describes their employment as having lasted more than 6 months. 40.39% describe their work as marginal activities that last less than 6 months. Of the 3,959 workers engaged in work lasting more than 6 months, 831 were cultivators (owner or co-owner) while 963 were agricultural laborers.

Particulars	Total	Male	Female
Total No. of Houses	1,877	-	-
Child (0-6)	11,561	5,976	5,585
Schedule Caste	2,111	915	835
Schedule Tribe	1	0	1
Literacy	72.98%	81.63%	63.64%
Total Workers	3,959	2,920	1,039
Main Worker	2,360	0	0
Marginal Worker	1599	0	0

Source: Census of India 2011
