= Jhumpura =

- Census town
- Location in Odisha, India Jhumpura (India)
- Coordinates: 21.866°N 85.557°E
- Country: India
- State: Odisha
- District: Kendujhar

Population (2017)
  - Total: 16,064

Languages
  - Official: Odia
  - Local: Ho
- Time zone: UTC+5:30 (IST)
- Vehicle registration: OD 09
- Website: odisha.gov.in

Jhumpura is a census town and a block in Kendujhar district in the Indian state of Odisha.

== Demographics ==
As of 2017 India census, Jhumpura had a population of 16,064. Males constitute 52% of the population and females 48%. Jhumpura has an average literacy rate of 82.73%, higher than the national average of 72.87%: male literacy is 88.31%, and female literacy is 76.72%. In Jhumpura, 13% of the population is under 6 years of age.

== Educational institutions ==
- Green Field School
- P.S. College, Jhumpura
- P.S High School
- Kerala English Medium School
- Misbha English Medium School
- Saraswati Sishu Mandir
- Jhumpura Maktab

== Transport ==
=== By road ===
- Jhumpura is well connected by Road. NH-20 (Formerly 215) passes through the town.
- Regular bus service with major cities like Kendujhar (20 km), Barbil (38 km), Bhubaneswar, Cuttack, Rourkela, Kolkata.

=== By rail ===
- Nearest Railway station is Porjanpur railway station, 11 km from town.
- Barbil-Puri express (Daily) and Puri-Chakradharapur (Daily), Tata-Visakhapatnam express (weekly) pass through the station.

=== By air ===
- Nearest airport is Bhubaneswar (245 km).
