= Khireitangiri =

Khireitangiri Khireitangiree
- Village
- Located in Patana Tehsil of Kendujhar district in Odisha, India. Khireitangiri (India)
- Coordinates: 21.712624°N 85.705456°E
- Country: India
- State: Odisha
- District: Kendujhar
- Named for: Maa Tangaranipata

Government
  - Body: Panchayat
- Elevation: 456 m (1,496 ft)

Population (2011)
  - Total: 2,475
  - Rank: 2,475
- Demonym: Khireitangiria

Languages
  - Official: Odia
- Time zone: UTC+5:30 (IST)
- PIN: 758046
- Telephone code: 06766
- Vehicle registration: OR 09/OD 09
- Website: odisha.gov.in

Khireitangiri is a village located in Patna Tehsil in the Kendujhar District in the Indian state of Odisha.

== Geography ==
Khireitangiri is a landlocked area situated in the northeastern part of Kendujhar. It is surrounded by Baunsuli to the north, Nuagaon and Dabarchua to the south, Dalanga to the east, and Bhuluda to the west. It is 13 kilometers east of the district headquarters of Kendujhar towards Kolkata, 25 kilometers from Patna and 211 kilometers from the state capital, Bhubaneswar.

Notable villages located close to Khireitangiree include Nelung (7 km), Sankiri (7 km), Badaneuli (8 km), Bodapalasa (8 km) and Chakundapal (10 km). Khireitangiree is surrounded by Patna Tehsil to the East, Jhumpura Tehsil and Sukruli Tehsil to the North, and Saharpada Tehsil to the East.

Kendujhar, Karanjia, Champua, Joda and Barbil are the nearest towns.

== Demographics ==
Khireitangiri has 580 families. According to a 2011 census, the Khireitangiree village has a population size of 2,475 (1237 men, 1238 women).

In Khireitangiree, the population of children aged 0–23 is 5,646, 13.05% of the total. The average sex ratio of Khireitangiree village is 1001, which is higher than the Orissa state average of 979. Child sex ratio for Khireitangiree as per census is 4781, lower than the Orissa average of 941. In 2011, the literacy rate of Khireitangiree was 72.12% as compared to 72.87% in Orissa. In Khireitangiree, male literacy stands at 82.09% while the female literacy rate is 62.42%.

== Language ==
Odia is the official language.

== Politics ==
Khireitangiri is administrated by a Sarpanch, or Head of Village, who is elected by the people.

Bharatiya Janata Party (BJP) and Biju Janata Dal (BJD) are the major political parties.

Khireitangiree comes under the Swampatna seat and the present (MLA) is Jagannath Naik from BJD. It comes under the Keonjhar (Lok Sabha seat). The present Member of Parliament is Chandrani Murmu from BJD.

== Education ==
- Biswa Binayaka Degree College
- Khireitangiree High School
- Khireitangiree U.P.(M.E.) School
- Khireitangiree Primary School
- Saraswati Sisu Mandir
- V. V. Play School

== Major festivals ==
Ratha Jatra, Laxmi Puja, Kali Puja, Mahasibaratri, Dol Purnima are the village's major festivals.

A biweekly Puja, a religious ritual, is performed in front of Maa Tangaraneepat, the Grama Debati. The Puja attracts people from nearby areas and neighbouring villages.

== Transport ==
The nearby National Highway 49 (also known as the Mumbai Kolkata highway AH46 or Great Eastern Highway) is one of India's busiest roads. It is accessible from major cities of Odisha and neighbouring states. Buses run through that highway. People can access those buses, which go to and from Bhubaneswar, Cuttack, Rourkela, Kolkata, Jamshedpur, Baripada, Balasore, Paradip, Sambalpur, Jharsuguda, Angul, Kharagpur, etc.

Over 10 km away, Kendujhar Railway Station is the nearest railway station.
