= Kandhara =

- Village
- Location in Odisha, India
- Coordinates: 21.3°N 85.33°E
- Country: India
- State: Odisha
- District: Dhenkanal

Government
  - MLA: Nrusingh Charan Sahoo
- Elevation: 14.62 m (48.0 ft)

Population (2007)
  - Total: 2,382 est.

Languages
  - Official: Odia
- Time zone: UTC+5:30 (IST)
- PIN: 759028
- Telephone code: 06768-
- Vehicle registration: OD-06

Kandhara is a village in the Dhenkanal district of the Indian state of Odisha, situated on the banks of the Ramial and Dolia rivers. It is located 20 km northwest of Kamakshyanagar, 55 km north of Dhenkanal, 135 km north of the state capital Bhubaneswar, 100 km west of Jajpur Road, and 65 km east of Talcher.

== Geography ==
Kandhara has an average elevation of 37 metres (121 feet). It is located at the apex of a delta formed by the rivers Ramial to the east and Dolia to the west. This is why the agricultural land is very fertile in nature.

== Education ==
Kandhara is the home of Dadhi Bamana Jew High School (established in 1992), two UP schools (the older one established in 1911), one ME school, and two Anganwadi centers.

== Transportation ==
Kandhara is well connected with all of the important places of Odisha by road.

== Demographics ==
The winter season, between November and beginning of January, is characterized by wind chill from the north, and long nights − the sun sets around 5:30 p.m. IST in December. Between the middle of January to the middle of March, the climate is pleasant with temperatures ranging from 22.2 °C to 33.4 °C. As most of the agricultural lands are irrigated, the inhabitants try to get maximum benefit from them, cultivating more than two crops in a year. The main crops are rice, bananas, sugarcane, chickpeas, lentils, groundnuts, oil seeds, tropical vegetables, and medicinal herbs. The staple foods are rice with Dal and curries.

== Festivals ==
Many festivals are celebrated by Kandhara's people, including Dola Melana, RajaUtshav, Rathyatra, Valukuni Puja, Laxmi Puja, Panchaka Mahotshav, and Asta Prahara Nama Yagna. People gather to celebrate regardless of caste and other differences. The festivals attract visitors from many other villages.

== Politics ==
Kandhara is part of Dhenkanal (Lok Sabha constituency). The current MP of Lok Sabha is Tathagata Satapathy of BJD, and the current MLA for Kandhara (Parjang Assembly Constituency) is Dr. Nrusing Charan Sahoo of BJD, who won the seat in the state elections of 2009.

== Nearby cities and towns ==
West	North	East	South
Parjang	Keonjhar	Daitari	Kamakshyanagar
Talcher	Dandadhar	Jajpur Road	Dhenkanal
