= Patna, Odisha =

Town in eastern state of Odisha

Patna
- Town
- Location within Odisha Location within India
- Coordinates: 20.062°N 86.301°E
- Country: India
- State: Odisha
- District: Kendujhar
- Constituency No: 23
- Vidhan Sabha constituency: Patna, Odisha

Patna is a town and community development block in the eastern state of Odisha, India. The town is represented in the Odisha Legislative Assembly by the Patna Assembly constituency. In 2019 election Biju Janata Dal candidate Jagannath Naik, defeated BJP candidate Bhabani Sankar Nayak.
