= Bhanda Kansara =

Bhanda Bhanda
- village
- Location in Orissa, India
- Coordinates: 21°56′18″N 85°42′2″E
- Country: India
- State: Odisha
- District: Kendujhar

Population
  - Total: 4,000
  - Density: 450/km^{2} (1,200/sq mi)
- Time zone: UTC+5:30 (IST)
- PIN: 758044
- Vehicle registration: OD 09
- Nearest city: Keonjhar, Karanjia, Joda, Barbil, Raurkela, Kolkota
- Sex ratio: 980 ♂/♀
- Literacy: 66%
- Lok Sabha constituency: Keonjhar
- Climate: moderate (Köppen)

Bhanda Kansara is a village in the Indian state of Odisha, with a population of more than 4,000 people located in the Kendujhar district.

== Geography ==
The village (between 21° 1′ N and 22° 10′ N latitude and 85° 11′ E to 86° 22′ E longitude), Bhanda Kansara is midway between the towns of Turumunga and Champua. The River Baitarani is 4 km from Bhanda Kansara, and the village is surrounded by one stream of the river called Mermenda.

== Arts and Culture ==
The centre of attraction in the village is the Jhumar Mandap (mandap is a type of pavilion), where folk artists from across Odisha and Jharkhand perform.

Bhanda Kansara has traditionally been known as a centre for metal work, primarily the manufacturing of bells and household utensils. Traditional craftsman also create artistic metal items such as idols of gods, goddesses, and animals, as well as bangles etc.

The famous Kichekeswari Temple is 12 km from Bhanda Kansara, in the village of Khiching. Bhanda village is big village in this area.in bhanda one Medical, one bank, RI office also available

== Education ==
Bhanda has 4 school .K.B high school Bhanda, K.B Girls High School Bhanda, Bhanda M.E School, Bhanda U.P School(Located in Bhanda Talsahi)

== Economy ==
In the past, Bhanda Kansara supplied high quality metal work for the local market as well as export to tata, bhubneswar, cuttack, and balasore. A dwindling supply of raw materials such as copper, tin, brass, and coal as fuel, has led many craftsmen to abandon their traditional occupation. A few bell metal shops remain in the village, but the traditional craft is nearly extinct.
