= Ukhunda =

- Village
- Location within Odisha
- Coordinates: 21.813930°N 85.686997°E
- Country: India
- State: Odisha
- District: Kendujhar
- Block: Jhumpura

Population (2011)
  - Total: 2,506

Ukhunda is a large Village and a market area located in Jhumpura block of Kendujhar district in Odisha, India.

== Demographics ==
The village has a population of 2506 of which 1247 are males while 1259 are females as per the Population Census 2011. The PIN Code of Ukhunda is 758032.

== Transport ==
Ukhunda is well connected by Road. Kendujhar- Champua Road passes through the Ukhunda.

Regular bus services from major cities like Kendujhar (25KM), Bhubaneswar, cuttack, Kolkata.

Nearest railway station is Parjanpur and Kendujhar Railway station.

Nearest airport is Bhubaneswar.

== Educational institutions ==
- Utkalamani Gapobandhu College, Ukhunda
- Ukhunda High School
- Saraswati Sishu mandir

and many English Medium Schools

== Health care ==
Ukhunda Govt. Hospital is one of the oldest hospitals of district
