= Jyotipur =

Village in Odisha, India

Coordinates: 21.903788°N 85.768431°E

Jyotipur is a village located in Champua Block of Kendujhar district in Odisha. The village has a population of 1,794, of which 871 are males while 923 are females as per the Population Census 2011. Bhanda, Kashipal, Budhikapudi and Turumunga are nearby villages to Jyotipur. The PIN code of Jyotipur is 758046.
