= Telkoi =

Town in Kendujhar district of Odisha

Coordinates: 21°21′N 85°24′E

Telkoi Charigarh
- Town
- Telkoi Block
- Interactive map of Telkoi
- Administrative: Keonjhar sadar
- State: Odisha
- District: Kendujhar

Government
  - Type: Republic
  - Body: Tahasildar
  - MLA: Fakir Mohan Naik

Population
  - Total: 120,000

Odia, santali, hoop
  - Official: Odia
- Time zone: UTC+5:30 (IST)
- PIN: 758019
- Website: odisha.gov.in

Telkoi is a town and community development block in the Kendujhar district of Odisha state in India.

Telkoi has a Community Health Centre (CHC).

Telkoi (Vidhan Sabha constituency) (Sl. No.: 20) is an Odisha Legislative Assembly constituency of Telkoi.
