= Purusottampur, Keonjhar =

Purusottampur
- Village
- Location in Odisha, India Purusottampur (India)
- Coordinates: 22.0882°N 85.5769°E
- Country: India
- State: Odisha
- District: Kendujhar

Population (2001)
  - Total: 1,246

Languages
  - Official: Oriya / Bangla
- Time zone: UTC+5:30 (IST)
- PIN: 758047
- Telephone code: 06767
- Vehicle registration: OR 09/OD 09
- Website: odisha.gov.in

Purusottampur, is a village in the taluk of Champua, district of Kendujhar, in the Indian state of Odisha. The total geographical area of village is 160 hectares.

== Demographics ==
The village has a population of 432 of which 193 are males while 239 are females as per the Population Census 2011.

Location Details
Tehsil Name	Champua
District	Kendujhar
State	Odisha
Continent	Asia
Time zone	IST (UTC+5:30)
Area	160 hectares
Households :	138
Elevation / Altitude	474 meters. Above Sea level
Telephone Code / Std Code	06767 / 956767
Currency	Indian Rupee ( INR )
Pin Code	758047

== Geography ==
It is located 63km to the north of District headquarters Kendujhar also 22.0882°N 85.5769°E. and 260km from the state capital Bhubaneswar, Purusottampur Pin code is 758047 and postal head office is Nayakrishnapur. Purusottampur is surrounded by Jagannathpur Tehsil to the north, Noamundi Tehsil to the west, and Manjhgaon Tehsil and Raruan Tehsil to the East. It is on the border of the Kendujhar district and West Singhbhum district.
