= Dolia =

Dolia may refer to:

- Dolia, Odisha, a village in India
- Dolianova, historically Dolia, a town in Italy
- Dolia River, a river in Romania
- Dolia (plant), or Nolana, a genus of plants
- Dolia (mythology), or Dola, a figure in Slavic mythology
- Dolium (plural is dolia), a type of earthenware vessel of ancient Rome

== See also ==
- Dolea
- Dolya (disambiguation)
