= Sadangi =

- Village
- Country: India
- State: Odisha

Languages
  - Official: Oriya
- Time zone: UTC+5:30 (IST)
- PIN: 758046
- Website: kendujhar.nic.in

Sadangi is a village in Kendujhar District in the Indian state of Odisha. It is the administrative headquarters of the Kendujhar district.

== Geography ==
Sadangi is a landlocked village situated in the northern part of Keonjhar, surrounded by Jyotipur panchayat of Jyotipur in the north, Jajapasi in the south, Unchabali and Bhanda in the west and Turumunga in the east.

== Demographics ==
As of 2011 India census, Kendujhar (Keonjhar) District: Census 2011 data

Sadangi village overview

An official Census 2011 detail of Sadangi, a village of Keonjhar has been released by Directorate of Census Operations in Orissa. Enumeration of key persons was also done by census officials in Kendujhar District of Orissa.

== Education ==
- Schools and colleges in Sadangi GP include:
- Sadangi UP School
- Sadangi M.E School
- M.K.G High School, Sadangi
- M.K.G College, Sadangi

=== Places to visit ===
Sadangi Shiv Mandir Hanuman Temple
