= Kushaleshwar Temple =

Kushaleswar Temple
- Holy Place
- Location in Odisha, India
- Coordinates: 21.1641°N 86.0674°E
- Country: India
- State: Odisha
- District: Kendujhar
- Elevation: 50 m (160 ft)

Languages
  - Official: Odia
- Time zone: UTC+5:30 (IST)
- PIN: 758025
- Vehicle registration: OR-09

Kushaleswar Temple is situated in the district of Keonjhar, at a distance of 90 km from Keonjhar city and 15 km from Anandapur. The temple is located in the bank of river Kusei. It was built during the 9th century AD by King Jajati Keshari. This temple pays homage to Lord Kushaleswar. The temple was built in Panchamukhi style with five different deities facing towards different directions. Lord Shiva is facing towards East direction, Goddess Parvati towards North direction, Lord Kartikeya and Bhairava towards West direction and Lord Ganesha towards South direction. An important monument of this place is a stone embankment built on the side of the river Kusei, to protect the temple from corrosion. This monument is the second of its kind in the State. Major festival of this temple is Maha Shiva Ratri, in which thousands of devotees come to pay homage to the deity from across the state. Many devotees also come to here in the month of Sravan as Bholebom Devotee.
