= Keonjhar Lok Sabha constituency =

Lok Sabha constituency in Odisha

Coordinates: 21.641388°N 85.612078°E

Kendujhar (ST) OD-4
- Lok Sabha constituency
- Interactive map of Kendujhar Lok Sabha constituency

Constituency details
- Country: India
- Region: East India
- State: Odisha
- Assembly constituencies: Telkoi; Ghasipura; Anandapur; Patna; Keonjhar; Champua; Karanjia
- Established: 1957
- Total electors: 15,89,941 (Note: as on 2024) (Note: as data published by election commission)
- Reservation: ST

Member of Parliament
- 18th Lok Sabha
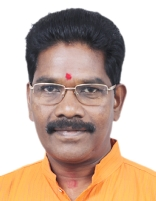
- Incumbent Ananta Nayak
- Party: BJP
- Elected year: 2024

Kendujhar is a Lok Sabha parliamentary constituency in Odisha.

== Assembly Segments ==
The assembly constituencies which constitute this parliamentary constituency, after the delimitation of Parliamentary Constituencies and Legislative Assembly Constituencies of 2008, are:

#	Name	District	Member	Party	Leading (in 2024)
20	Telkoi (ST)	Keonjhar	Fakir Mohan Naik	BJP	BJP
21	Ghasipura	Keonjhar	Badri Narayan Patra	BJD	BJD
22	Anandapur (SC)	Keonjhar	Abhimanyu Sethi	BJD	BJP
23	Patna (ST)	Keonjhar	Akhila Chandra Naik	BJP	BJP
24	Keonjhar (ST)	Keonjhar	Mohan Charan Majhi	BJP	BJP
25	Champua	Keonjhar	Sanatan Mahakud	BJD	BJD
30	Karanjia (ST)	Mayurbhanj	Padma Charan Haiburu	BJP	BJP

== Elected members ==
Vote share of winning candidates
2024	45.67%
2019	44.74%
2014	32.26%
2009	30.75%
2004	43.66%
1999	67.47%
1998	54.09%
1996	45.82%
1991	44.07%
1989	60.86%
1984	57.68%
1980	68.36%
1977	60.42%
1971	43.47%

Since its formation in 1957, 17 elections have been held till date.

List of members elected from Keonjhar constituency are

Year	Member	Party
1957	Laxmi Narayan Bhanja Deo	Independent
1962	Laxmi Narayan Bhanja Deo	Indian National Congress
1967	Gurucharan Naik	Swatantra Party
1971	Kumar Majhi	Indian National Congress
1977	Govinda Munda	Bharatiya Lok Dal
1980	Harihar Soren	Indian National Congress (I)
1984	Harihar Soren	Indian National Congress
1989	Govind Chandra Munda	Janata Dal
1991	Govind Chandra Munda	Janata Dal
1996	Madhab Sardar	Indian National Congress
1998	Upendra Nath Nayak	Bharatiya Janata Party
1999	Ananta Nayak	Bharatiya Janata Party
2004	Ananta Nayak	Bharatiya Janata Party
2009	Yashbant Narayan Singh Laguri	Biju Janata Dal
2014	Sakuntala Laguri	Biju Janata Dal
2019	Chandrani Murmu	Biju Janata Dal
2024	Ananta Nayak	Bharatiya Janata Party

== Election results ==
=== 2024 ===
Voting was held on 25th May 2024 in the 6th phase of Indian General Election. Counting of votes was on 4th June 2024. In 2024 election, Bharatiya Janata Party candidate Ananta Nayak defeated Biju Janata Dal candidate Dhanurjay Sidu by a margin of 97,042 votes.

2024 Indian general election: Keonjhar
Party	Candidate	Votes	%	±%
BJP	Ananta Nayak	573,923	45.67	
BJD	Dhanurjay Sidu	4,76,881	37.95	
INC	Binod Bihari Nayak	1,04,944	8.38	
NOTA	None of the above	24,763	1.97	
Majority		97,042	7.72	
Turnout		12,58,771	79.17	
BJP gain from BJD				

=== 2019 ===
In the 2019 election, Biju Janata Dal candidate Chandrani Murmu defeated Bharatiya Janata Party candidate Ananta Nayak by a margin of 66,192 votes.

2019 Indian general elections: Keonjhar
Party	Candidate	Votes	%	±%
BJD	Chandrani Murmu	526,359	44.75	
BJP	Ananta Nayak	4,60,156	39.12	
INC	Mohan Kumar Hembram	1,28,716	10.94	
NOTA	None of the above	19,207	1.63	
Majority		66,203	5.62	
Turnout		11,76,479	77.57	
BJD hold				

=== 2014 ===
In 2014 election, Biju Janata Dal candidate Sakuntala Laguri defeated Bharatiya Janata Party candidate Ananta Nayak by a margin of 157,317 votes.

2014 Indian general elections: Keonjhar
Party	Candidate	Votes	%	±%
BJD	Sakuntala Laguri	434,471	40.09	
BJP	Ananta Nayak	2,77,154	25.54	
INC	Madhaba Sardar	1,90,531	17.58	
Independent	Basudeb Naik	1,01,999	9.41	
NOTA	None of the above	26,065	2.40	
Majority		1,57,317	14.51	
Turnout		10,84,571	80.54	
BJD hold				

=== 2009 ===
In 2009 election, Biju Janata Dal candidate Yashbant Narayan Singh Laguri defeated Indian National Congress candidate Dhanurjaya Sidu by a margin of 126,484 votes.

2009 Indian general elections: Keonjhar
Party	Candidate	Votes	%	±%
BJD	Yashbant Narayan Singh Laguri	389,104	49.63	
INC	Dhanurjaya Sidu	2,62,620	29.45	
BJP	Ananta Nayak	1,64,023	18.29	
Independent	Fakir Mohan Naik	32,356	3.63	
Majority		1,26,484	14.18	
Turnout		8,91,746	70.48	
BJD gain from BJP				

== See also ==
- Kendujhar
- List of constituencies of the Lok Sabha
