= Turumunga =

Village in Odisha, India

Coordinates: 21.797927°N 85.801624°E

Turumunga is a village located in Patna Block of Kendujhar district in Odisha. The village has a population of 2,164, of which 1,117 are males while 1,047 are females as per the Population Census 2011. The PIN Code of Turumunga is 758046.

Turumunga is situated at 26 km from the district headquarters Kendujhar towards Kolkata. Chadheibhol, Rajnagar, Chilida, Khireitangiree and Ukhunda are the nearby villages of Turumunga.
