= Pipilia =

Coordinates: 21.731350°N 85.881657°E

Pipilia is a medium-size village located in Ghatgaon of Kendujhar district, Odisha with a total of 392 families residing. The Pipilia village has population of 1,764, of which 888 are males while 876 are females as per Population Census 2011. Asanabani, Bankapatuli, Chikinia and Mundatangara are the nearby villages to Pipilia.
