= Harihar Soren =

Indian politician (1929–2004)

Member of Parliament, Lok Sabha
- In office 1980–1989
- Preceded by: Govinda Munda
- Succeeded by: Govind Chandra Munda
- Constituency: Keonjhar, Odisha

Personal details
- Born: 28 August 1929 Pabitradiha Village, Keonjhar Garh, Keonjhar District, Orissa British India
- Died: 28 November 2004 (aged 75)
- Party: Indian National Congress
- Spouse: Basanti Soren

Harihar Soren (28 August 1929 – 28 November 2004) was an Indian politician and belonged to Indian National Congress. He was elected to the Lok Sabha, lower house of the Parliament of India from Keonjhar in Odisha. Soren died on 28 November 2004, at the age of 75.
