= Minakshi Mahanta =

Indian politician

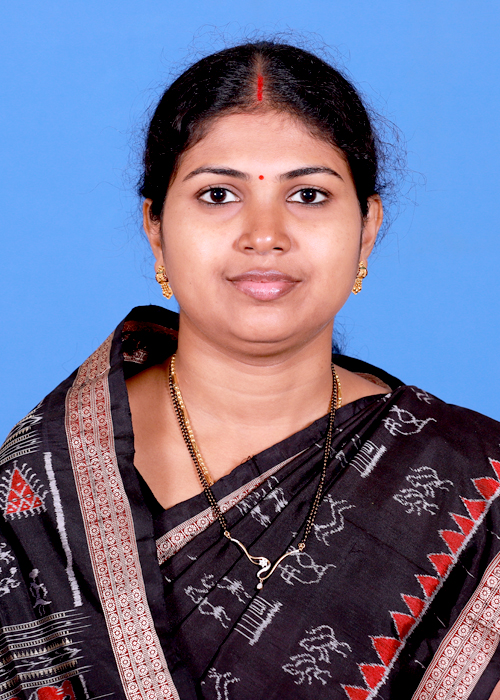

Member of the Odisha Legislative Assembly
- Incumbent
- Assumed office 2019
- Preceded by: Sanatan Mahakud
- Constituency: Champua

Personal details
- Party: Biju Janata Dal

Minakshi Mahanta is an Indian politician. She was elected to the Odisha Legislative Assembly from Champua as a member of the Biju Janata Dal.
