= Madhab Sardar =

Indian politician

Member: 11th Lok Sabha
- In office 1996–1998
- Preceded by: Govind Chandra Munda
- Succeeded by: Upendra Nath Nayak
- Constituency: Keonjhar

Personal details
- Party: Biju Janata Dal
- Other political affiliations: Congress
- Profession: Politician

Madhab Sardar is a politician from Odisha, India. He represented Keonjhar (Lok Sabha constituency) from the year 1996 to 1998. He is a member of Biju Janata Dal. He was previously associated with the Indian National Congress.
