= Ananta Nayak =

Indian politician

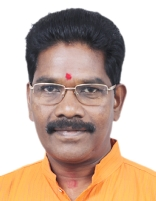
- Official Portrait

Member of Parliament, Lok Sabha
- Incumbent
- Assumed office 4 June 2024
- Preceded by: Chandrani Murmu
- Constituency: Keonjhar
- In office 1999–2009
- Preceded by: Upendra Nath Nayak
- Succeeded by: Yashbant Narayan Singh Laguri

Personal details
- Born: 1 May 1969 (age 56) Kendujhar, Odisha
- Party: BJP
- Spouse: Labangalata Nayak
- Children: Antaryami Nayak

Ananta Nayak (born 1 May 1969) is an Indian politician who is a member of the 18th Lok Sabha of India. He represents the Keonjhar constituency of Odisha and is a member of the Bharatiya Janata Party (BJP).

Nayak became the Member of Parliament at the age of 30 from the Kendujhar constituency. He has won two consecutive elections from the Kendujhar constituency. He is the President (Tribal Morcha) in India, Bharatiya Janata Party.

On 24 February 2021 he was appointed a Member of National Commission for Scheduled Tribes, a constitutional body under Article 338A of the Constitution of India.
