= Yashbant Narayan Singh Laguri =

Indian politician

Member: 15th Lok Sabha
- In office 2009–2014
- Preceded by: Ananta Nayak
- Succeeded by: Sakuntala Laguri
- Constituency: Keonjhar

Personal details
- Born: 18 April 1971 (age 55) Ramala, Keonjhar
- Party: BJD
- Spouse: Sakuntala Laguri

Yashbant Narayan Singh Laguri (born 18 April 1971) is a member of the 15th Lok Sabha of India. He represents the Keonjhar constituency of Odisha and is a member of the Indian National Congress (INC) political party.

== See also ==
- Keonjhar (Lok Sabha constituency)
- Indian general election in Orissa, 2009
- Biju Janata Dal
