= Machhagarh =

Coordinates: 21.670075°N 86.055369°E

Machhagarh is a village in Saharpada, Kendujhar district, Odisha, India.
