= Baunsuli =

Coordinates: 21°44′14″N 85°42′48″E

- Village
- Interactive map of Baunsuli
- Country: India
- State: Odisha
- District: Kendujhar
- Tehsil: Turumunga

Area
  - Total: 917 ha (2,270 acres)

Population
  - Total: 2,012
  - Male: 946
  - Female: 1,066
- Pincode: 758032

Baunsuli is a village in Turumunga tehsil of Kendujhar district in the state of Odisha, India. The village is 30 km (19 mi) from sub-district headquarter Turumunga and 16 km (9.9 mi) from district headquarter Kendujhar. As per 2009 stats, the village is also a gram panchayat.

The total area of village is 917 hectares. 2,012 people live in the village.Of these. 946 are male and 1,066 are female. There are about 496 houses in Baunsuli village.

Kendujhar is the nearest town to Baunsuli for all major economic activities. It is about 17 km (11 mi) away from the village.
