= Kendujhar (sadar) =

Kendujhar Sadar
- Town
- Location in Odisha, India Kendujhar Sadar (India)
- Coordinates: 21.66°N 85.62°E
- Country: India
- State: Odisha
- District: Kendujhar district
- Elevation: 456 m (1,496 ft)

Population (2011)
  - Total: 60,590

Languages
  - Official: Odia
  - Local: Ho, Santali, Kudmali
- Time zone: UTC+5:30 (IST)
- PIN: 758001
- Vehicle registration: OD-09
- Website: odisha.gov.in

Kendujhar Sadar is an administrative unit in the Kendujhar district in the state of Odisha, India. This subdivision consists of the town Keundujhar, the administrative headquarters of the eponymous district.

== Administrative divisions ==
Kendujhar Sadar is the largest subdivision out of the three in the Kendujhar district (the other two being Anandapur and Champua). It consists of seven blocks of 160 Gram Panchayats:

- Sadar
- Ghatagaon
- Harichandanpur
- Telkoi
- Banspal
- Patna
- Saharpada

== Geography ==
Champua is located at 21.66°N 85.62°E. It has an average elevation of 456 metres.

== Demographics ==
Kendujhar Subdivision has a population of 871,927 according to the 2011 India Census.

== Languages ==
The dominant language is Odia, with some locals speaking Hindi and English.

== Politics ==
Kendujhar Sadar is part of Keonjhar.

The three Vidhan sabha constituencies of the Kendujhar district and its elected members of that area are:

No.	Constituency	Reservation	Extent of the Assembly Constituency (Blocks)	Member of 16th Assembly	Party
20	Telkoi	ST	Harichandanpur, Telkoi, Banspal (Part)	Premananda Nayak	BJD
23	Patna	ST	Patna, Saharpada, Jhumpura (part), Champua (part)	Hrusikesh Naik	BJD
24	Keonjhar	ST	Keonjhar (M), Keonjhar, Jhumpura (part), Bansapal (Part)	Mohan Charan Majhi	BJD
