= Hrushikesh Naik =

Indian politician

Hrushikesh Naik is a politician from Odisha, India. He represents the Patna (Odisha Vidhan Sabha constituency) since the year 2014.

He is the chairperson of District Planning Committee (DPC) of Kendujhar District.
