= Abhimanyu Sethi =

Indian politician

Member of the Odisha Legislative Assembly
- Incumbent
- Assumed office 8 October 2024
- Preceded by: Bhagirathi Sethy
- Constituency: Anandapur

Personal details
- Political party: Biju Janata Dal
- Profession: Politician

Abhimanyu Sethi is an Indian politician from Odisha. He is a Member of the Odisha Legislative Assembly from 2024, representing Anandapur Assembly constituency as a Member of the Biju Janata Dal.

== See also ==
- 2024 Odisha Legislative Assembly election
- Odisha Legislative Assembly
