= Balagoda =

Balagoda Bolani
- town
- Location in Odisha, India Balagoda (India)
- Coordinates: 22.10°N 85.37°E
- Country: India
- State: Odisha
- District: Kendujhar
- Elevation: 457 m (1,499 ft)

Population (2001)
  - Total: 11,830

Languages
  - Official: Odia
- Time zone: UTC+5:30 (IST)
- Vehicle registration: OD 09
- Website: odisha.gov.in

Balagoda (Bolani) is a census town in Kendujhar district in the state of Odisha, India.

== Geography ==
Balagoda (Bolani) is located at 22.10°N 85.37°E. It has an average elevation of 457 m (1,499 ft).

== Demographics ==
As of 2001 India census, Balagoda (Bolani) had a population of 11,830. Males constitute 53% of the population and females 47%. Balagoda (Bolani) has an average literacy rate of 63%, higher than the national average of 59.5%; 72% of the males and 52% of females are literate. 14% of the population is under 6 years of age.
