= Dolya =

Dolya may refer to:

== Places ==
- Dolya, Luhans Oblast a village in Svatove Raion, Ukraine
- Dolya, Donetsk Oblast, a village in Volnovakha Raion, Ukraine
- Dolya Tessera, a geological feature on Venus

== Other uses ==
- Dolya (unit), an old Russian unit of mass
- Dolya (mythology), or Dola, a figure in Slavic mythology
- "Fate" (Ukrainian: Dolya), a poem by Taras Shevchenko
- Galina Dolya, Soviet athlete
- Dolya Gavanski, actress and director

== See also ==
- Dolia (disambiguation)
- Dolja (disambiguation)
