= Dolja =

Dolja may refer to:

- Dolja, Gusinje, Montenegro
- Dolja, Zrenjanin, a neighbourhood of Zrenjanin, Serbia

== See also ==
- Dolya (disambiguation)
