= Gourahari Naik =

Indian politician (died 2020)

Gourahari Naik (died 23 January 2020) was a politician from Odisha, India. He represented the Patna (Odisha Vidhan Sabha constituency) twice.
