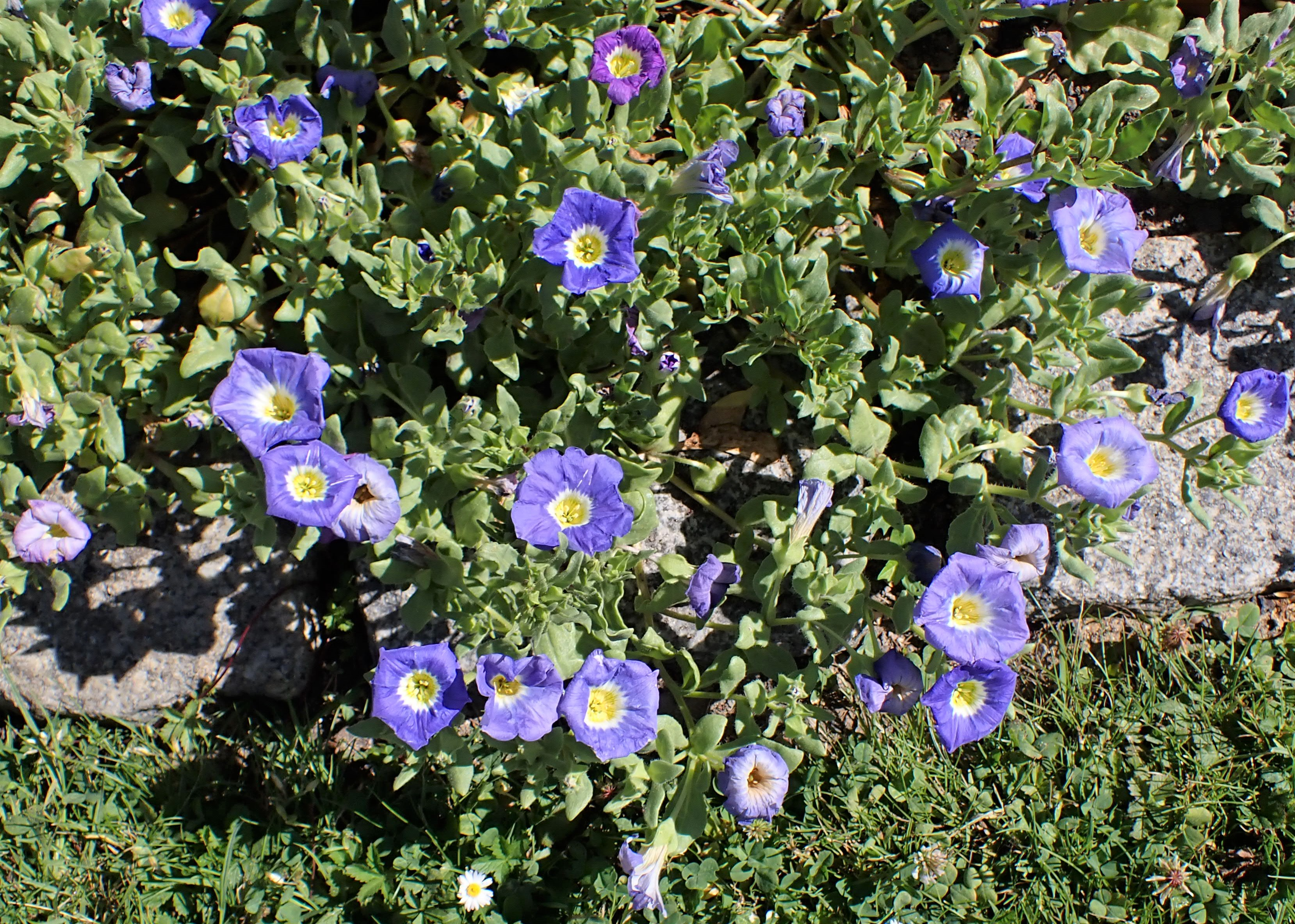
- At the Berlin Botanical Garden and Botanical Museum
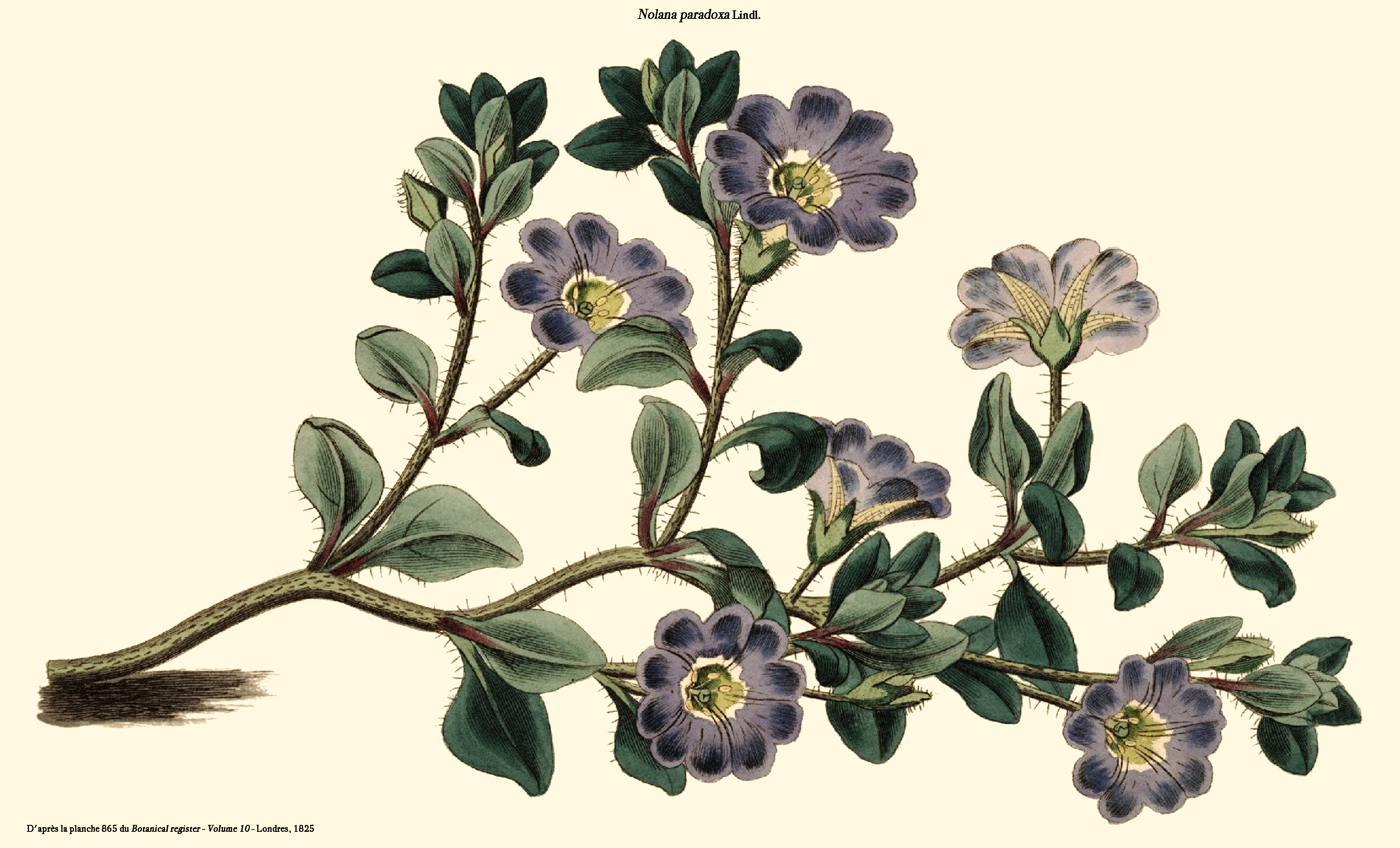
- Botanical illustration

Scientific classification
- Kingdom: Plantae
- Clade: Tracheophytes
- Clade: Angiosperms
- Clade: Eudicots
- Clade: Asterids
- Order: Solanales
- Family: Solanaceae
- Genus: Nolana
- Species: N. paradoxa

Binomial name
- Nolana paradoxa Lindl.

Synonyms
- List: Nolana alba Phil.; Nolana atriplicifolia D.Don; Nolana atriplicifolia f. alba (S.W.Fletcher) Moldenke; Nolana atriplicifolia var. cuneifolia Dunal; Nolana geminiflora Phil.; Nolana grandiflora F.Dietr.; Nolana littoralis (Miers) Dunal; Nolana napiformis Phil.; Nolana navarri Phil.; Nolana ochrocarpa Phil.; Nolana paradoxa var. alba S.W.Fletcher; Nolana paradoxa subsp. atriplicifolia (D.Don) Mesa; Nolana petiolata (Phil.) Reiche; Nolana rupestris Phil.; Periloba paradoxa (Lindl.) Raf.; Sorema atriplicifolia (D.Don) Lindl.; Sorema littoralis Miers; Sorema paradoxa (Lindl.) Lindl.; Sorema petiolata Phil.

= Nolana paradoxa =

Species of plant in the nightshade family

Nolana paradoxa, the Chilean bellflower, is a species of flowering plant in the family Solanaceae, native to central and southern Chile. A spreading half-hardy annual reaching 9 in (23 cm) and useful as an edger or ground cover, it requires full sun. There is a cultivar, 'Blue Bird'.

N. paradoxa serves as a model system for scientific studies on flower color.
