= Sanatan Mahakud =

Indian politician

Member of the Legislative Assembly of Odisha
- Incumbent
- Assumed office 2024
- Preceded by: Minakshi Mahanta
- Constituency: Champua
- In office 2014–2019

Personal details
- Born: 1958 (age 67–68) Nambira, Kendujhar district, Odisha, India
- Party: Independent
- Other political affiliations: Indian National Congress , Jana Samriddhi Party
- Children: Pankaj Mahakud
- Parent: Chema Mahakud (father)
- Education: Bamebari High School, Kendujhar
- Profession: Politician and Social Worker

Sanatan Mahakud is a politician from Odisha, India. He represents the Champua since the year 2024.

On 20 April 2016, Keonjhar district officials announced that they would demolish Mahakud's home due to it being on land originally leased to a mining company named Essel Mining & Industries Limited but later Mr. Mahakud has taken stay order from Odisha High court.

== Early life ==
Sanatan Mahakud was born in 1958 to Chema Mahakud at Nambira village of Kendujhar district in Odisha.
