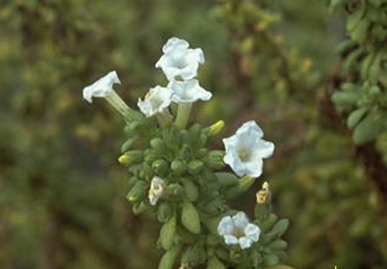

Scientific classification
- Kingdom: Plantae
- Clade: Tracheophytes
- Clade: Angiosperms
- Clade: Eudicots
- Clade: Asterids
- Order: Solanales
- Family: Solanaceae
- Genus: Nolana
- Species: N. galapagensis

Binomial name
- Nolana galapagensis (Christoph.) I.M.Johnst. (1936)

= Nolana galapagensis =

Plant species from the Galapagos Islands

Nolana galapagensis, is a species of flowering plant in the Solanaceae (nightshade) family. It is endemic to the Galapagos Islands.

== Description ==
Nolana galapagensis is a small shrub with small fleshy green leaves that are arranged in dense groups along the branches. It has small white flowers.

== Range and habitat ==
Nolana galapagensis is endemic to the Galapagos Islands, where it grows along the coasts of most of the islands.
