= Chandrani Murmu =

Indian politician (born 1993)

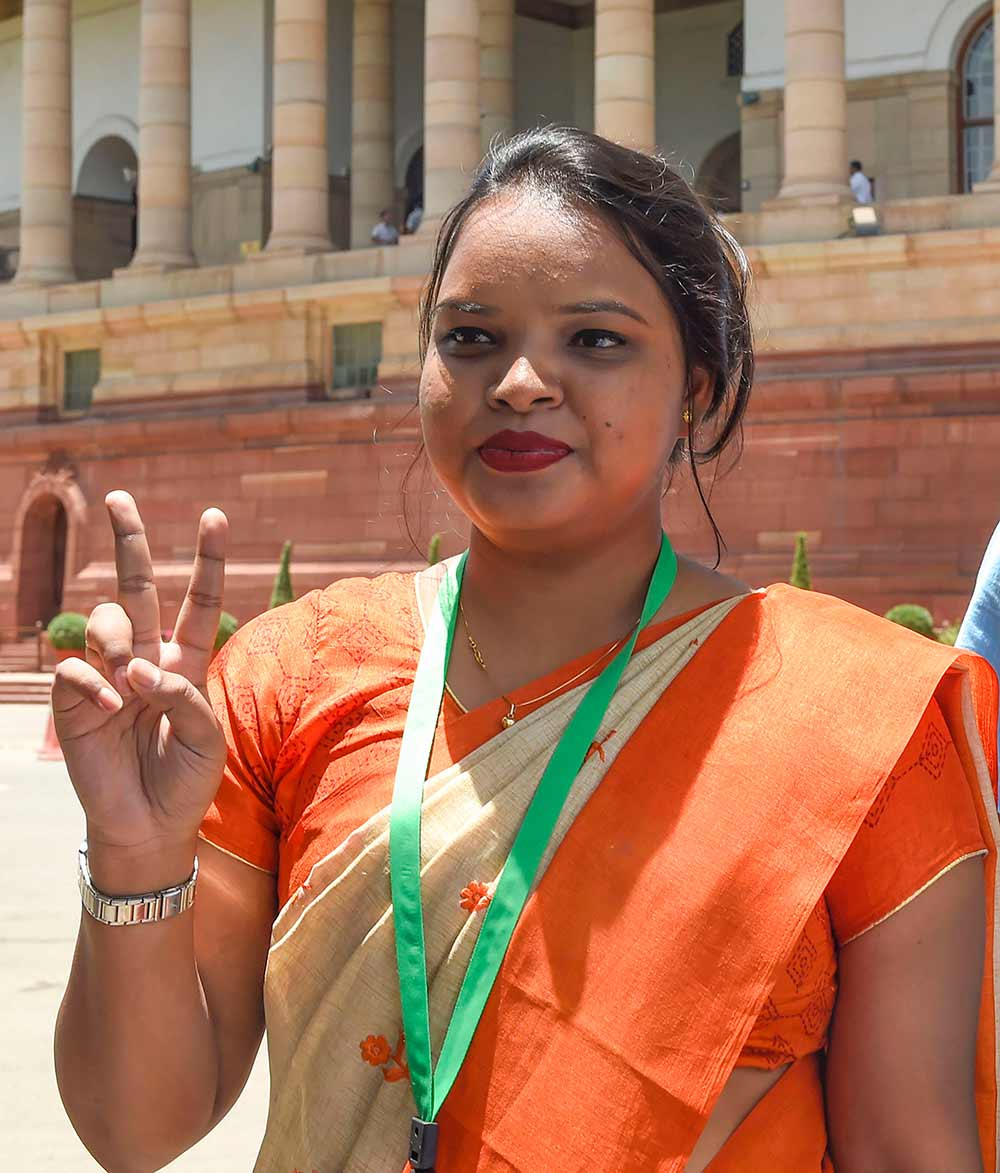

Member of Parliament, Lok Sabha
- In office 23 May 2019 – 4 June 2024
- Preceded by: Sakuntala Laguri
- Succeeded by: Ananta Nayak
- Constituency: Kendujhar

Personal details
- Born: 16 June 1993 (age 32) Kendujhar, Odisha, India
- Party: Biju Janata Dal

Chandrani Murmu (born 16 June 1993) is an Indian politician. She was elected to the Lok Sabha, lower house of the Parliament of India from Keonjhar, Odisha in the 2019 Indian general election as a member of the Biju Janata Dal. When first elected, Chandrani Murmu was the youngest Indian Member of Parliament.

Murmu won against BJP's Ananta Nayak, who has previously won twice, by a margin of 66,203 votes. She succeeded Sakuntala Laguri to win the election from Keonjhar for the BJD once again. The youngest MP in the 16th Lok Sabha was Dushyant Chautala representing the Indian National Lok Dal from Hisar in Haryana.

== Early and personal life ==
Chandrani Murmu was born on 16 June 1993 to Sanjiv Murmu, a government employee and Urbashi Soren, daughter of former MP Hariharan Soren (who won from Keonjhar on behalf of the Congress in 1980 and 1984). Murmu completed her degree in Mechanical Engineering from Siksha 'O' Anusandhan University, Bhubaneswar, in 2017. She had been preparing for competitive exams when she was approached by the BJD, through her maternal uncle Harmohan Soren, to contest from the constituency of Keonjhar. Being a reserved tribal constituency, the BJD was looking for an educated woman to contest from here.

Some discrepancies were found in her father’s name, which was brought up with the Chief Electoral Officer.

She was also the victim of an obscene video featuring a morphed image of hers which was circulated on social media.
