= Sakuntala Laguri =

Indian politician

Member of Parliament, Lok Sabha
- In office 2014–2019
- Preceded by: Yashbant Narayan Singh Laguri
- Succeeded by: Chandrani Murmu
- Constituency: Keonjhar

Personal details
- Party: Biju Janata Dal
- Spouse: Yashbant Narayan Singh Laguri
- Profession: Politician

Sakuntala Laguri is an Indian politician. She was elected to the 16th Lok Sabha in 2014 from Keonjhar constituency in Odisha. She is a member of the Biju Janata Dal (BJD) political party.

== See also ==
- Indian general election, 2014 (Odisha)
