= Anandapur Assembly constituency =

Constituency of the Odisha legislative assembly in India

Coordinates: 21.22°N 86.12°E

Anandapur
- Constituency No. 22 for the Odisha Legislative Assembly

Constituency details
- Country: India
- Region: East India
- State: Odisha
- Division: Northern Division
- District: Kendujhar
- Lok Sabha constituency: Keonjhar
- Established: 1951
- Total electors: 2,35,679 (Note: as on 2024) (Note: as data published by election commission)
- Reservation: SC

Member of Legislative Assembly
- 17th Odisha Legislative Assembly
- Incumbent Abhimanyu Sethi
- Party: Biju Janata Dal
- Elected year: 2024

Anandapur is a Vidhan Sabha constituency of Kendujhar district.

Area of this constituency includes Anandapur, Hatadihi block and 14 GPs (Bailo, Baunsagarh, Belabahali, Gayalmunda, Haridapal, Jalasuan, Kantipal, Kathakata, Kodapada, Manoharpur, Panasadiha, Panchupalli, Salabani and Taratara) of Anandapur block.

== Elected members ==
Vote share of winning candidates
2024	39.67%
2019	53.00%
2014	51.46%
2009	38.99%
2004	54.15%
2000	51.55%
1995	51.66%
1990	59.18%
1985	60.30%
1980	61.24%
1977	58.34%

Since its formation in 1951, 19 elections were held including in 3 bypolls in 1958 (for both seats) & 1959. It was a 2 member constituency for 1952 & 1957.

List of members elected from Anandapur constituency are:

Year	Member	Party
2024	Abhimanyu Sethi	Biju Janata Dal
2019	Bhagirathi Sethy	Biju Janata Dal
2014	Mayadhar Jena	Biju Janata Dal
2009	Bhagirathi Sethy	Biju Janata Dal
2004	Jayadev Jena	Indian National Congress
2000	Mayadhar Jena	Bharatiya Janata Party
1995	Jayadev Jena	Indian National Congress
1990	Dasarathi Jena	Janata Dal
1985	Jayadev Jena	Indian National Congress
1980	Jayadev Jena	Indian National Congress (I)
1977	Makara Sethi	Janata Party
1974	Bhubanananda Jena	Indian National Congress
1971	Makara Sethi	Indian National Congress (R)
1967	Bhubanananda Jena	Orissa Jana Congress
1961	Makara Sethi	Indian National Congress
1959 (bypoll) (Note: Resignation of Narasingha Narayan Bhanja Deo)	Upendra Jena	Ganatantra Parishad
1958 (bypoll) (Note: Resignation of Sitting MLAs)	Narasingha Narayan Bhanja Deo (Note: Resignation of Upendra Jena)	Indian National Congress
1958 (bypoll)	Makara Sethi (Note: Resignation of Bira Kishore Jena)	Indian National Congress
1957 (Note: It was a 2 member constituency)	Upendra Jena	Ganatantra Parishad
1957	Bira Kishore Jena	Ganatantra Parishad
1951 (Note: It was a 2 member constituency)	Janardan Bhanja Deo	Independent politician
1951	Bhaiga Sethi	Independent politician

== Election results ==
=== 2024 ===
Voting were held on 25th May 2024 in 3rd phase of Odisha Assembly Election & 6th phase of Indian General Election. Counting of votes was on 4th June 2024. In 2024 election, Biju Janata Dal candidate Abhimanyu Sethi defeated Indian National Congress candidate Jayadev Jena by a margin of 10,966 votes.

2024 Odisha Vidhan Sabha Election, Anandapur
Party	Candidate	Votes	%	±%
BJD	Abhimanyu Sethi	71,651	39.67	▼13.33
INC	Jayadev Jena	60,685	33.60	▲6.60
BJP	Alok Kumar Sethy	42,591	23.58	▲4.98
Independent	Jhansirani Das	1,707	0.95	
NOTA	None of the above	1,605	0.89	▲0.29
Majority		10,966	6.1	
Turnout		180,599	76.63	
BJD hold				

=== 2019 ===
In 2019 election, Biju Janata Dal candidate Bhagirathi Sethy defeated Indian National Congress candidate Jayadev Jena by a margin of 44,193 votes.

2019 Odisha Legislative Assembly election: Anandapur
Party	Candidate	Votes	%	±%
BJD	Bhagirathi Sethy	89,850	53.00	▲1.54
INC	Jayadev Jena	45,657	27.00	▼10.60
BJP	Alok Kumar Sethy	31,554	18.60	▲10.70
NOTA	None of the above	1029	0.6	
Majority		44,193	26.10	
Turnout		170429	75.3	
BJD hold				

=== 2014 ===
In 2014 election, Biju Janata Dal candidate Mayadhar Jena defeated Indian National Congress candidate Jayadev Jena by a margin of 22,224 votes.

2014 Odisha Legislative Assembly election: Anandapur
Party	Candidate	Votes	%	±%
BJD	Mayadhar Jena	82,520	51.46	▲12.47
INC	Jayadev Jena	60,296	37.6	▲1.98
BJP	Alok Kumar Sethy	12,664	7.9	▲0.16
NOTA	None of the above	1,918	1.2	
Majority		22,224	13.86	
Turnout		1,60,346	80.85	7.91
Registered electors		1,98,329		
BJD hold				

=== 2009 ===
In 2009 election, Biju Janata Dal candidate Bhagirathi Sethy defeated Indian National Congress candidate Jayadev Jena by a margin of 23,805 votes.

2009 Odisha Legislative Assembly election: Anandapur
Party	Candidate	Votes	%	±%
BJD	Bhagirathi Sethy	54,266	38.99	−
INC	Jayadev Jena	48,960	35.62	−
BJP	Arati Singh	10,644	7.74	−
Majority		23,805	17.32 (Note: %of total valid votes)	
Turnout		1,37,462	72.94	
BJD gain from INC				
