= Juang language =

Munda language of Odisha, India

Juang
- ଜୁଆଙ୍ଗ
- A native Juang speaker introducing himself in Juang in 2025
- Native to: India
- Region: Odisha
- Ethnicity: Juang
- Native speakers: 30,000 (2011 census)
- Language family: Austroasiatic: Munda; South; Juang
- Writing system: Odia

Language codes
- ISO 639-3: jun
- Glottolog: juan1238
- ELP: Juang
- Coordinates: 20°9′0″N 85°30′0″E

Juang (pronounced [d͡ʒɥaŋˈgataˈ]) is a Munda language of the Austroasiatic language family spoken primarily by the Juang people of Odisha state, eastern India.

== Classification ==
The Juang language belongs to the Munda language family, the whole of which is classified as a branch of the greater Austroasiatic language family. Among the Munda languages, Juang is considered to be most closely related to Kharia, although Anderson considers Juang and Kharia to have split off from each other relatively early.

Juang can be roughly divided into the Hill and Plains varieties, both of which are spoken in Odisha (Patnaik 2008:508).

- Hill Juang: Gonasika Hills (in Keonjhar district) and Pallara Hills
- Plains Juang: about 147 villages in southern Keonjhar district and eastern Dhenkanal district

== Distribution ==
A Juang-language educator and writer shares the current state of documentation of his language

Juang is spoken by about 30,875 people according to the 2001 Indian census, 65% of ethnic population In Odisha state, it is spoken in southern Keonjhar district, northern Angul district, and eastern Dhenkanal district (Patnaik 2008:508).

Juang is currently an Endangered language and is considered to vulnerable, or (not spoken by children outside of home).

Juang currently has roughly under 20,000 speakers remaining

== Phonology ==
=== Vowels ===
Juang vowels
| | Front | Central | Back |
|---|---|---|---|
| Close | i | | u |
| Mid | e | | o |
| Open | | a | ɔ |

/e/ has a variant of /ɛ/. /a/ is sometimes realized as a schwa.

Glide realization tends to occur when words that have one among two vowels /u/ and /i/, or both, preceded another vowel.

- /arɔkia/ → [arɔkja] "they two"
- /uaɭi/ → [waɭi] "child"
- /kui/ → [kwi] "get"
- /kua/ → [kwa] "handful"
- /dui/ → [dwi] "two"

All Juang vowels can be nasalized. There are some attested cases where nasalization may have phonemic status, like in follow minimal pairs:

- tɔɔro "I fastened" vs. tɔ̃ɔ̃rɔ "elephant trunk"
- kɔnia "marriageable" vs. kɔ̃ɳia "safe"

=== Consonants ===
Juang consonants
| | | Bilabial | Dental/ Alveolar | Retroflex | Post-alv./ Palatal | Velar |
|---|---|---|---|---|---|---|
| Plosive/ Affricate | voiceless | p | t | ʈ | tʃ | k |
| Plosive/ Affricate | voiced | b | d | ɖ | dʒ | ɡ |
| Fricative | | | s | | | |
| Nasal | | m | n | ɳ | ɲ | ŋ |
| Lateral | | | l | ɭ | | |
| Trill | | | r | | | |
| Approximant | | | | | j | |

Some minimal pairs listed below demonstrate Juang distinguishment between phonemes:

- /ʈ/ vs. /t̪/: ʈɔke "cheat" vs. tɔke "tired"
- /t̪/ vs. /d̪/: tɔke "tired" vs. dɔkɔ "sit"
- /p/ vs. /b/: page "break" vs. bɔge "command"
- /b/ vs. /m/: bɔge "command" vs. mɔtej "nose"
- /k/ vs. /g/: kɔŋ "know" vs. gɔn "weave"
- /k/ vs. /tʃ/: kɔke "shaves" vs. tʃake "taste"
- /tʃ/ vs. /dʒ/: tʃake "taste" vs. dʒɔge "watch"
- /r/ vs. /l/: rɔge "flour" vs. lage "continue"

Retroflex stops are rare in word-final position.

=== Prosody ===
Stress in phonological words is always released on the second syllable. In sentence, intonation falls on the last word, usually a verb.

== Morphology ==
Being in state of assimilation into larger Indo-Aryan populations, Juang speakers have borrowed a significant portion of vocabulary from Hindi and Oriya, while the head-marking feature of the language is eroding.

=== Nominals ===
Juang differentiates three numbers: singular (unmarked), dual (-kia), and plural (-ki).

The number system is divided into two sets which are used depending on degree of honorificity. For examples, muinʈo ('one') is used to refer something in non-honorific expression, and minog (one.HON) is used to address something in respectful way.

Numeral classifier goʈa is used when numerals occur prenominally.

tini goʈa uaɭi-ɖi-ki
three CLF child-DEF-PL
'three children'

Juang is a nominative-accusative language; pronouns and noun phrases are unmarked or marked by case markers to indicate syntactic roles.

- Nominative case: unmarked.
- Accusative/Dative cases: -te, sometimes -bo or -bɔ.
- Genitive case: -a/-rɔ/-ra/-ka (-ka for emphatic expressions)
- Locative cases: -bɔ/-ya/-ɖa/-e/-ra/-re
- Ablative case: -ta/-tasun

Gender in Juang is marked by several affixes.

Nominative subject, genitive, non-finite verbs and few finite verbs are suffixed with definiteness markers -ɖe, -re, and -ro. The genitive suffix -ka is sometimes interpreted as marking emphasis type of definiteness.

Juang has a simple set of free pronouns and interrogative pronouns. The free pronouns can be marked by case and possessive suffixes. Interrogatives can take case markers and occur in several case-marked positions.

Juang free pronouns
| | singular | dual | plural |
|---|---|---|---|
| 1st person | aiɲ | ninba | niɲ |
| 2nd person | am | apa | ape |
| 3rd person | arɔ | arɔkia | arɔki |

| | Interrogatives |
|---|---|
| biri | 'what?' |
| adi-aliŋa | 'why?' |
| adi-a | 'whose?' |
| adi-te | 'whom?' |
| adi | 'who?' |

Juang has complex word derivation processes that involve not only reduplication, prefixation, suffixation, but also ambifixation.

gata "say" → a-gata-e "untold story"

ɔːnɔ "saw" → a-ɔn-dʒɔnɔ "unseen things"

=== Verbs ===
==== Types of verbal heads ====
In Juang a number of roots are clearly exempt from the Transitive verb/Intransitive verb opposition, so that the function of the root can be determined only from its co-occurrence with the particular set of tense markers.

For Example,

pag- Set I 'to break' -Set II 'to be broken'

rag- Set I 'to tear' - Set II 'to be torn'

guj- Set I 'to wash' - Set II 'to be washed'

As in most Munda languages, Juang does not strongly distinguish parts of speech.

o-ɖag-e
CAUS-water-INF
'to moisten'

==== Person indexation ====
Juang verbs are increasingly becoming similar to those of Kharia: object indexing is being lost gradually due to superstratum pressure from Aryan. Nowadays, as it is, Juang object indexing is no longer obligatory or productive as compared to other Munda languages or at the time when Matson (1964) made his observation.

Transitive verb paradigm
| | | patient | | | | | | | | |
| | | 1SG | 1DU | 1PL | 2SG | 2DU | 2PL | 3SG | 3DU | 3PL |
|---|---|---|---|---|---|---|---|---|---|---|
| agent | 1SG | | | | Ø-Σ/V/-m (Note: Ø:unmarked, /V/–infixing a vowel, /mV/–infixing m(vowel of the verb stem).) | Ø-Σ/V/-pa | Ø-Σ/V/-pe | Ø-Σ/V/-Ø | (-kia) | (-ki) |
| agent | 1DU.INCL | | | | ba-Σ-m | ba-Σ-pa | ba-Σ-pe | | | |
| agent | 1PL.EXCL | | | | nV-Σ-m | nV-Σ-pa | nV-Σ-pe | | | |
| agent | 2SG | mV-Σ-ŋ | mV-Σ-ŋba | mV-Σ-ɲeniɲ | | | | | | |
| agent | 2DU | a-Σ-ŋ | a-Σ-ŋba | a-Σ-ɲeniɲ | | | | | | |
| agent | 2PL | V-Σ-ŋ | V-Σ-ŋba | V-Σ-ɲeniɲ | | | | | | |
| agent | 3SG | Σ/mV/-ŋ | Σ/mV/-ŋba | Σ/mV/-ɲeniɲ | Σ/mV/-m | Σ/mV/-pa | Σ/mV/-pe | | | |
| agent | 3DU | Σ-ŋ-kia | Σ-ŋba-kia | Σ-ɲeniɲ-kia | Σ-m-kia | Σ-pa-kia | Σ-pe-kia | | | |
| agent | 3PL | Σ-ŋ-ki | Σ-ŋba-ki | Σ-ɲeniɲ-ki | Σ-m-ki | Σ-pa-ki | Σ-pe-ki | | | |

==== TAM marking ====
The tense paradigm of Juang is relatively simple:

| | Middle | Active |
|---|---|---|
| Simple Present | -ɖe | -ke |
| Simple Past | -an | -ɔ |
| Future/Irrealis | -na | -e |

Juang middle past -an seems to corresponds to Proto-North Munda transitive past marker *-χəd. Anderson (2007) suggests that the Proto-North Munda and the Juang reflex possibly belong to the oldest Proto-Munda TAM system.

There are other affixes used to encode various types of aspects and modal expressions in Juang. Many of them are homophonous/overlapped with other predicative markers since their exact behaviors and functions are most likely underinvestigated.

- Perfect -se & -tʃe occupy the slot right behind the lexical heads of predicates
- Second perfect -te and -ro
- Progressive -nɔm and -nɔman with masdars or non-derived contentive morphemes
- Subjunctive -tan
- Imperative has several markers depending on person/number
  - Second person imperatives -me, -pe, -pa
  - First & third person imperatives ku- and -ɖe
  - Prohibitive -ro and -do

==== Negation ====
Juang, together with Gorum and Gutob, arguably feature the most complex systems of negation among the Munda languages. Below is the simplified chart of negative markers found in Juang.

Negative markers in Juang
| Argument | Person negative | General negatives |
|---|---|---|
| 1SG | Ø- | -dʒena |
| 1DU | b- | ama-/mama-/am-/ab- |
| 1PL | n- | -na |
| 2SG | m- | nɔ- |
| 2DU | a- | -rɔ |
| 2PL | e- | |
| 3SG | | |
| 3DU | -kia | |
| 3PL | -ki | |

These negative markers can occur in prefixal, suffixal, and ambifixive positions. There are instances of double negatives. The negated monosyllabic verbs sometimes may reduplicate as well.

== Writing System ==
The writing system used by people who speak the Juang language is Odia.

== Sources ==
- Odia-Juang Sabdakosh
- Mahapatra, B. P.. “Comparative Notes on Juang and Kharia Finite Verbs”. Oceanic Linguistics Special Publications 13 (1976): 801–814.
- Matson, Dan Mitchell (1964). PhD Dissertation: A Grammatical Sketch of Juang. University of Wisconsin–Madison.
- Patnaik, Manideepa (2008). "Juang". The Munda Languages. New York: Routledge. pp. 508–556. ISBN 0-415-32890-X.
- "ScriptSource - Oriya". scriptsource.org.
- Rajendra, S. (2002). "Juanga". Linguistic Survey of India – Orissa (PDF). Language division, Office of the Registrar General, India. pp. 335–371.
