= Upendra Nath Nayak =

Indian politician

Upendra Nath Nayak is a politician from Odisha, India. He represented Keonjhar (Lok Sabha constituency) during the 12th Lok Sabha. He represented as a candidate of Bharatiya Janata Party.
