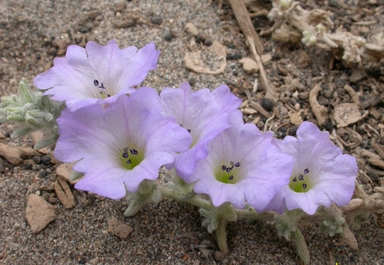
- Nolana confinis

Scientific classification
- Kingdom: Plantae
- Clade: Tracheophytes
- Clade: Angiosperms
- Clade: Eudicots
- Clade: Asterids
- Order: Solanales
- Family: Solanaceae
- Subfamily: Solanoideae
- Tribe: Nolaneae; Rchb.
- Genus: Nolana; L. (1762)

Species
- 72; see text

Synonyms
- Alibrexia Miers (1845); Alona Lindl. (1844); Aplocarya Lindl. (1844); Bargemontia Gaudich. (1841); Dolia Lindl. (1844); Gubleria Gaudich. (1851); Leloutrea Gaudich. (1852); Neudorfia Adans. (1763); Osteocarpus Phil. (1884); Periloba Raf. (1838); Rayeria Gaudich. (1851); Sorema Lindl. (1844); Teganium Schmidel (1763); Tula Adans. (1763); Velpeaulia Gaudich. (1852); Walkeria Mill. ex Ehret (1763), nom. superfl.; Zwingera Hofer (1762)

= Nolana =

Species of plant

Nolana (Peruvian bell flower) is a genus of hard annual or perennial plants in the nightshade family. The genus is mostly native to Chile and Peru. Species in this genus, especially N. paradoxa, serve as a model system for studies on flower color.

== Classification ==
There are a number of synonyms for Nolana: Alibrexia, Alona, Aplocarya, Bargemontia, Dolia, Gubleria, Leloutrea, Neudorfia, Osteocarpus, Periloba, Rayera, Sorema, Teganium, Tula, Velpeaulia, Walkeria, and Zwingera.

Nolana is the only genus in the Solanaceae which has a fruit composed of mericarps, although its flower and other vegetative morphology is similar to other plants in this family. It seems to be most closely related to Lycium.

== Species ==
Plants of the World Online Accepts 72 species, listed below. Other sources range from 85 to 89 species.

- Nolana acuminata (Miers) Dunal
- Nolana adansonii (Schult.) I.M.Johnst.
- Nolana aenigma M.O.Dillon, S.Leiva & Quip.
- Nolana albescens (Phil.) I.M.Johnst.
- Nolana aplocaryoides (Gaudich.) I.M.Johnst.
- Nolana arenicola I.M.Johnst.
- Nolana arequipensis M.O.Dillon & Quip.
- Nolana baccata (Lindl.) Dunal
- Nolana balsamiflua (Gaudich.) Mesa
- Nolana bombonensis Quip. & M.O.Dillon
- Nolana callae Quip. & M.O.Dillon
- Nolana carnosa (Lindl.) Miers ex Dunal
- Nolana chancoana M.O.Dillon & Quip.
- Nolana chapiensis M.O.Dillon & Quip.
- Nolana clivicola (I.M.Johnst.) I.M.Johnst.
- Nolana coelestis (Lindl.) Miers ex Dunal
- Nolana confinis (I.M.Johnst.) I.M.Johnst.
- Nolana crassulifolia Kunze ex Walp.
- Nolana deflexa (I.M.Johnst.) I.M.Johnst.
- Nolana dianae M.O.Dillon
- Nolana divaricata (Lindl.) I.M.Johnst.
- Nolana elegans (Phil.) Reiche
- Nolana filifolia (Hook. & Arn.) I.M.Johnst.
- Nolana flaccida (Phil.) I.M.Johnst.
- Nolana foliosa (Phil.) I.M.Johnst.
- Nolana galapagensis (Christoph.) I.M.Johnst.
- Nolana gayana (Gaudich.) I.M.Johnst.
- Nolana glauca (I.M.Johnst.) I.M.Johnst.
- Nolana gracillima (I.M.Johnst.) I.M.Johnst.
- Nolana hoxeyi M.O.Dillon & Quip.
- Nolana humifusa (Gouan) I.M.Johnst.
- Nolana incana (Phil.) I.M.Johnst.
- Nolana inconspicua (I.M.Johnst.) I.M.Johnst.
- Nolana inflata Ruiz & Pav.
- Nolana intonsa I.M.Johnst.
- Nolana jaffuelii I.M.Johnst.
- Nolana lachimbensis M.O.Dillon & Luebert
- Nolana latipes I.M.Johnst.
- Nolana laxa (Miers) I.M.Johnst.
- Nolana leptophylla (Miers) I.M.Johnst.
- Nolana lezamae M.O.Dillon, S.Leiva & Quip.
- Nolana linearifolia Phil.
- Nolana lycioides I.M.Johnst.
- Nolana mariarosae Ferreyra
- Nolana mollis (Phil.) I.M.Johnst.
- Nolana onoana M.O.Dillon & M.Nakaz.
- Nolana paradoxa Lindl.
- Nolana parviflora (Phil.) Phil.
- Nolana patachensis J.Hepp & M.O.Dillon
- Nolana peruviana (Gaudich.) I.M.Johnst.
- Nolana philippiana M.O.Dillon & Luebert
- Nolana platyphylla (I.M.Johnst.) I.M.Johnst.
- Nolana polymorpha Gaudich.
- Nolana pterocarpa Phil. ex Wettst.
- Nolana quicachaensis Quip. & M.O.Dillon
- Nolana ramosissima I.M.Johnst.
- Nolana reichei M.O.Dillon & Arancio
- Nolana rhombifolia Martic. & Quezada
- Nolana rostrata (Lindl.) Miers ex Dunal
- Nolana rupicola Gaudich.
- Nolana salsoloides (Lindl.) I.M.Johnst.
- Nolana samaensis M.O.Dillon & Quip.
- Nolana scaposa Ferreyra
- Nolana sedifolia Poepp.
- Nolana sessiliflora Phil.
- Nolana sphaerophylla (Phil.) Mesa ex M.O.Dillon
- Nolana stenophylla I.M.Johnst.
- Nolana tarapacana (Phil.) I.M.Johnst.
- Nolana tocopillensis (I.M.Johnst.) I.M.Johnst.
- Nolana tricotiflora Quip. & M.O.Dillon
- Nolana villosa (Phil.) I.M.Johnst.
- Nolana werdermannii I.M.Johnst.
