= Saharpada =

Coordinates: 21.737134°N 85.944789°E

Saharpada is a village located in Kendujhar district in Odisha. Aharpada, Bhaliadiha and Haladibata are nearby villages to Saharpada. The PIN Code of Saharpada is 758016.

== See also ==
- Machhagarh
