= Daitari =

- Census town
- Location in Odisha, India Daitari (India)
- Coordinates: 21.112°N 85.823°E
- Country: India
- State: Odisha
- District: Kendujhar
- Elevation: 229 m (751 ft)

Population (2001)
  - Total: 4,239

Languages
  - Official: Odia
- Time zone: UTC+5:30 (IST)
- Vehicle registration: OD 09
- Website: odisha.gov.in

Daitari is a census town in Kendujhar district in the state of Odisha, India.

== Geography ==
Daitari is located at 21.1°N 85.75°E. It has an average elevation of 550 metres (1804 feet).

== Demographics ==
As of 2001 India census, Daitari had a population of 4239. Males constitute 54% of the population and females 46%. Daitari has an average literacy rate of 69%, higher than the national average of 59.5%: male literacy is 78% and, female literacy is 60%. In Daitari, 11% of the population is under 6 years of age.
