= Bhagirathi Sethy =

Indian politician

Member of Odisha Legislative Assembly
- In office 2009–2014
- Preceded by: Mayadhar Jena
- Constituency: Anandapur
- In office 2024–2019

Personal details
- Party: Biju Janata Dal
- Profession: Politician

Bhagirathi Sethy is an Indian politician from Odisha. He was a two time elected Member of the Odisha Legislative Assembly from 2009 and 2019, representing Anandapur Assembly constituency as a Member of the Biju Janata Dal.

== See also ==
- 2009 Odisha Legislative Assembly election
- Odisha Legislative Assembly
