= Champua =

- Town
- Location in Odisha, India Champua (India)
- Coordinates: 22.08°N 85.67°E
- Country: India
- State: Odisha
- District: Kendujhar district
- Elevation: 346 m (1,135 ft)

Population (2011)
  - Total: 10,394

Languages
  - Official: Odia,
  - Local: Ho, Munda, Kudmali
- Time zone: UTC+5:30 (IST)
- Postal code: 758041
- Vehicle registration: OD 09
- Website: odisha.gov.in

Champua is a notified area council in Kendujhar district in the state of Odisha, India. As per SC & ST department of Odisha, the Champua sub-division is under scheduled areas of Odisha. The area is the site of Nicholson Forest training institute. The suburb has its importance as it provides a major trade route for transport of iron ore and manganese from some of the major mines of the state to the nearest port & out-state depots. It is also known for its pre-independence truss bridge built by British rulers, the judicial buildings of the same period as well as a few educational institutes who have a good reputation in the state. Baitarani river, which is the second largest river of the state after Mahanadi, flows by Champua.

== Major Tribes ==
Champua block is inhabited by tribal communities like Ho, Juang, Bhuinya, Oraon, Gond, Bhumij and other tribal communities. These tribes constitute nearly 87.21% population of the Sub-division.

== Geography ==
Champua is located at 22.08°N 85.67°E. It has an average elevation of 346 metres (1135 feet).

== Demographics ==
Champua has a population of 10,394, of which 5,543 are males, while 4,851 are females as per a report released by Census India 2011. The literacy rate of Champua city is 87% higher than the state average of 72.87%. Male literacy is 90.85%, while female literacy rate is 82.59%.

== Languages ==
As the champua area has been dominated by Ho people, local people widely speak in the Ho language [it is written with the "Varang Kshiti" (also "Warang Chiti" script)] as their mode of communication. Most people can speak, write all three languages Odia, Hindi, and English.

== Politics ==
The current MLA for Champua (GE) Assembly Constituency is Minaskhi Mahanta, of the Biju Janata Dal (BJD) party, who defeated Murali Sharma, a candidate from the Bharatiya Janata Party (BJP).

Champua is part of Keonjhar (Lok Sabha constituency).
