= Juang people =

Ethnic group

Juang
- A native Juang speaker introducing himself in Juang in 2025

Total population
- 47,095 (2011)

Regions with significant populations
- India; Odisha

Languages
- Juang, Odia

Religion
- Hinduism • Sarnaism

Related ethnic groups
- Munda • Ho • Santhal • Mon-Khmer people

The Juang are an Austroasiatic ethnic group found only in the Gonsaika hills of Keonjhar district of Odisha. Some Juangs, however migrated to neighbouring plains of Dhenkanal district of Odisha during the Bhuiyan revolt in the late 19th century. The Juang language belongs to the Munda family of the Austroasiatic languages. They are classified as a Scheduled Tribe by the Indian government. The 2011 census showed their population to be around 50,000.

== History ==
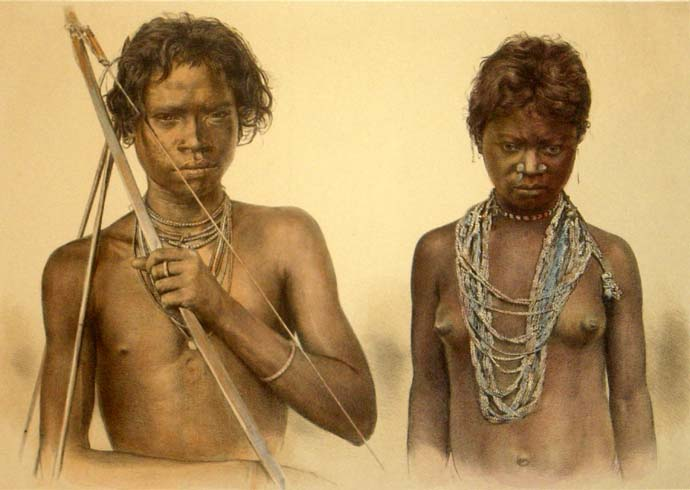
A sketch of Juang people in 1872

A Juang-language educator and writer shares the current state of documentation of his language

The Juang tradition claims that the place where the tribe originated is the Gonasika Hills, near Keonjhar, at the source of the Baitarani River. After the British declared their forests as reserves, the Juangs were forced to look for an alternative way of sustenance. They were skilled at basket-weaving, which was in demand in nearby caste villages. The Juangs would exchange their baskets for salt, oil, food, money from the village traders.

== Culture ==
Their traditional folk dance included vigorous dances mimicking birds and other animals. They celebrate festival such as Pusha Purnima, Amba Nuakhia, Pirha Puja, Akhaya Trutiya, Asarhi, Gahma etc.

Formerly the Juang used to be also known as Patuas, literally "leaf-wearers". Traditionally the women wore girdles of leaves, while the men wore a small loincloth.

=== Language ===
Mother tongue of Juang people (2011 census)
1. Juang (63.2%)
2. Odia (35.5%)
3. Santali (0.89%)
4. Other (0.49%)

== Bibliography ==
- Acharya, Sabita; Mohanty, S. K. (2015). Ethnography of Juang Tribe Odisha. Gyanajuga Publication. ISBN 978-93-85798-44-3.
- Dāśa, Rabinārāẏaṇa (1992). Art and Culture of the Juang. Orissa Lalit Kala Akademi.
- Patnaik, N. (1989). The Juang. Tribal and Harijan Research-cum-Training Institute, H. & T.W. Department.
- Forest Tribes of Orissa: The Juang. D.K. Printworld. 2002.
- Sahoo, Madhusmita; Naidu, T. Subramanyam (2017). A Heritage of Tribes in India: Ethnic Diversity of the Juang Tribes. SSDN Publishers & Distributors. ISBN 978-93-83575-07-7.
