= Telkoi Assembly constituency =

Assembly constituency in Odisha

Telkoi
- Constituency No. 20 for the Odisha Legislative Assembly

Constituency details
- Country: India
- Region: East India
- State: Odisha
- Division: Northern Division
- District: Kendujhar
- Lok Sabha constituency: Keonjhar
- Established: 1961
- Total electors: 2,40,261 (Note: as on 2024) (Note: as data published by election commission)
- Reservation: ST

Member of Legislative Assembly
- 17th Odisha Legislative Assembly
- Incumbent Fakir Mohan Naik
- Party: Bharatiya Janata Party
- Elected year: 2024

Telkoi is an Odisha Legislative Assembly constituency of Kendujhar district, Odisha, India. Following 2008 Delimitation, Ramchandrapur Assembly Constituency was subsumed into this constituency.

Area of this constituency includes Telkoi block, Harichandanpur block and 16 GPs (Banspal, Baragarh, Bayakumutia, Gonasika, Jatra, Kalanda, Karangdihi, Kuanr, Nayakote, Phuljhar, Saharapur, Singhpur, Talakadakala, Tana, Taramakant and Uppar Raigoda) of Banspal block.

== Elected members ==
Vote share of winning candidates
2024	43.49%
2019	41.98%
2014	39.72%
2009	40.73%
2004	37.92%
2000	56.05%
1995	47.79%
1990	72.06%
1985	61.29%
1980	58.59%
1977	48.64%

Since its formation in 1961, 15 elections were held till date.

List of members elected from Telkoi constituency are:

Year	Member	Party
2024	Fakir Mohan Naik	Bharatiya Janata Party
2019	Premananda Nayak	Biju Janata Dal
2014	Bedabyasa Nayak	Biju Janata Dal
2009	Premananda Nayak	Biju Janata Dal
2004	Niladri Nayak	Biju Janata Dal
2000	Niladri Nayak	Biju Janata Dal
1995	Chandrasena Naik	Indian National Congress
1990	Niladri Nayak	Janata Dal
1985	Pranaballav Naik	Indian National Congress
1980	Chandrasena Naik	Indian National Congress (I)
1977	Niladri Nayak	Janata Party
1974	Niladri Nayak	Pragati Dal
1971	Niladri Nayak	Utkal Congress
1967	Bhagirathi Mohapatra	Swatantra Party
1961	Govinda Chandra Munda	Swatantra Party

== Election results ==
=== 2024 ===
Voting were held on 25th May 2024 in 3rd phase of Odisha Assembly Election & 6th phase of Indian General Election. Counting of votes was on 4th June 2024. In 2024 election, Bharatiya Janata Party candidate Fakir Mohan Naik defeated Biju Janata Dal candidate Madhab Sardar by a margin of 9,439 votes.

2024 Odisha Vidhan Sabha Election: Telkoi
Party	Candidate	Votes	%	±%
BJP	Fakir Mohan Naik	83,818	43.49	
BJD	Madhab Sardar	74,379	38.59	
INC	Nirmal Chandra Nayak	11,395	5.91	
NOTA	None of the above	6,877	3.57	
Majority		9,439	4.90	
Turnout		1,92,719	80.21	
BJP gain from BJD				

=== 2019 ===
In 2019 election, Biju Janata Dal candidate Premananda Nayak defeated Bharatiya Janata Party candidate Dhanurjaya Sidu by a margin of 5,920 votes.

2019 Odisha Vidhan Sabha Election: Telkoi
Party	Candidate	Votes	%	±%
BJD	Premananda Nayak	74,148	41.98	▲2.26
BJP	Dhanurjaya Sidu	68,228	38.63	▲26.11
INC	Prashant Kumar Dalai	23,508	13.31	▼18.10
NOTA	None of the above	4,297	2.43	
Majority		5,920	3.35	
Turnout		1,76,614	78.37	
BJD hold				

=== 2014 ===
In 2014 election, Biju Janata Dal candidate Bedabyasa Nayak defeated Indian National Congress candidate Dhanurjaya Sidu by a margin of 13,954 votes.

2014 Odisha Vidhan Sabha Election: Telkoi
Party	Candidate	Votes	%	±%
BJD	Bedabyasa Nayak	66,675	39.72	▼1.01
INC	Dhanurjaya Sidu	52,721	31.41	▲4.04
BJP	Kailash Chandra Nayak	21,018	12.52	▲1.61
Independent	Brundaban Naik	14,080	8.39	−
NOTA	None of the above	3675	2.19	
Majority		13,954	8.31	
Turnout		1,67,872	84.2	
BJD hold				

=== 2009 ===
In 2009 election, Biju Janata Dal candidate Premananda Nayak defeated Indian National Congress candidate Brundaban Naik by a margin of 17,478 votes.

2009 Odisha Vidhan Sabha Election: Telkoi
Party	Candidate	Votes	%	±%
BJD	Premananda Nayak	53,279	40.73	−
INC	Brundaban Naik	35,801	27.37	−
BJP	Manas Kumar Naik	14,270	10.91	−
Independent	Shiba Purty	12,351	9.44	−
Majority		17,478	13.36 (Note: % of total valid votes)	
Turnout		1,30,822	69.86	
BJD hold				
