= Premananda Nayak =

Indian politician

Member of Odisha Legislative Assembly
- In office 2009–2014
- Preceded by: Bedabyasa Nayak
- Constituency: Telkoi
- In office 2024–2019

Personal details
- Party: Biju Janata Dal
- Profession: Politician

Premananda Nayak is an Indian politician from Odisha. He was a two time elected Member of the Odisha Legislative Assembly from 2009 and 2019, representing Telkoi Assembly constituency as a Member of the Biju Janata Dal.

== See also ==
- 2019 Odisha Legislative Assembly election
- Odisha Legislative Assembly
