= Akhila Chandra Naik =

Indian politician

Member of Odisha Legislative Assembly
- Incumbent
- Assumed office 4 June 2024
- Preceded by: Jagannath Naik
- Constituency: Patna

Personal details
- Party: Bharatiya Janata Party
- Profession: Politician

Akhila Chandra Naik is an Indian politician. He was elected to the Odisha Legislative Assembly from Patna as a member of the Bharatiya Janata Party.
