= Patna Assembly constituency =

Assembly constituency in Odisha

Coordinates: 20.062°N 86.30°E

Patna
- Constituency No. 23 for the Odisha Legislative Assembly

Constituency details
- Country: India
- Region: East India
- State: Odisha
- Division: Northern Division
- District: Kendujhar
- Lok Sabha constituency: Keonjhar
- Established: 1961
- Total electors: 2,14,433 (Note: as on 2024) (Note: as data published by election commission)
- Reservation: ST

Member of Legislative Assembly
- 17th Odisha Legislative Assembly
- Incumbent Akhila Chandra Naik
- Party: Bharatiya Janata Party
- Elected year: 2024

Patna is one of the 147 Legislative Assembly constituencies of Odisha state in India. It is in Kendujhar district and is reserved for candidates belonging to the Scheduled Tribes. It is a segment of the Kendujhar parliamentary constituency.

Area of this constituency includes Patna block, Saharpada block, 10 GPs (Asanpat, Khuntapada, Badadumuria, Badaneuli, Baria, Dhanurjayapur, Gundunia, Tukudiha, Ukhunda and Chauthia GPs of Jhumpura block and 6 GPs of (Jajaposi, Jally, Sadangi, Jyotipur, Bhuinpur and Parsala) of Champua block.

== Elected members ==
Vote share of winning candidates
2024	55.72%
2019	43.72%
2014	29.92%
2009	42.47%
2004	38.75%
2000	59.38%
1995	39.16%
1990	69.41%
1985	60.77%
1980	41.38%
1977	67.77%

Since its formation in 1961, 15 elections were held till date.

List of members elected from Patna constituency are:

Year	Member	Party
2024	Akhila Chandra Naik	Bharatiya Janata Party
2019	Jagannath Naik	Biju Janata Dal
2014	Hrushikesh Naik	Biju Janata Dal
2009	Hrushikesh Naik	Biju Janata Dal
2004	Gourahari Naik	Bharatiya Janata Party
2000	Gourahari Naik	Bharatiya Janata Party
1995	Hrusikesh Naik	Indian National Congress
1990	Kanhu Charan Naik	Janata Dal
1985	Hrusikesh Naik	Indian National Congress
1980	Hrusikesh Naik	Janata Party (Secular)
1977	Maheswar Majhi	Janata Party
1974	Maheswar Majhi	Utkal Congress
1971	Maheswar Majhi	Utkal Congress
1967	Ramaray Munda	Swatantra Party
1961	Raj Ballabh Mishra	Swatantra Party

== Election results ==
=== 2024 ===
Voting were held on 25th May 2024 in 3rd phase of Odisha Assembly Election & 6th phase of Indian General Election. Counting of votes was on 4th June 2024. In 2024 election, Bharatiya Janata Party candidate Akhila Chandra Naik defeated Biju Janata Dal candidate Jagannath Naik by a margin of 37,979 votes.

2024 Odisha Vidhan Sabha Election: Patna
Party	Candidate	Votes	%	±%
BJP	Akhila Chandra Naik	97,041	55.72	
BJD	Jagannath Naik	59,062	33.91	
INC	Hrushikesh Naik	9,871	5.67	
NOTA	None of the above	2,353	1.35	
Majority		37,979	21.81	
Turnout		1,74,159	81.22	
BJP gain from BJD				

=== 2019 ===
In 2019 election, Biju Janata Dal candidate Jagannath Naik defeated Bharatiya Janata Party candidate Bhabani Sankar Nayak by a margin of 7,796.

2019 Odisha Vidhan Sabha Election: Patna
Party	Candidate	Votes	%	±%
BJD	Jagannath Naik	70,310	44.20	▲14.28
BJP	Bhabani Sankar Nayak	62,514	39.30	▲15.32
INC	Binod Bihari Naik	13,058	8.20	▼5.38
Independent	Akhila Chandra Naik	8,074	5.10	−
NOTA	None of the above	1,688	1.05	
Majority		7,796	4.90	
Turnout		1,60,828	78.66	
BJD hold				

=== 2014 ===
In 2014 election, Biju Janata Dal candidate Hrushikesh Naik defeated Bharatiya Janata Party candidate Bhabani Sankar Nayak by a margin of 8,843.

2014 Odisha Vidhan Sabha Election: Patna
Party	Candidate	Votes	%	±%
BJD	Hrushikesh Naik	44,584	29.92	▼12.55
BJP	Bhabani Sankar Nayak	35,741	23.98	▲4.40
Independent	Gourahari Naik	22,430	15.05	−
INC	Sanatan Naik	20,238	13.58	▲0.69
Majority		8,843	5.94	
Turnout		1,31,837	81.06	
BJD hold				

=== 2009 ===
In 2009 election, Biju Janata Dal candidate Hrushikesh Naik defeated Indian National Congress candidate Sanatan Naik by a margin of 24,624.

2009 Odisha Vidhan Sabha Election: Patna
Party	Candidate	Votes	%	±%
BJD	Hrushikesh Naik	53,408	42.47	−
INC	Sanatan Naik	28,784	12.89	−
BJP	Gourahari Naik	23,816	18.94	−
Majority		24,624	19.58 (Note: % of total valid votes)	
Turnout		1,25,754	71.82	
BJD gain from BJP				

== See also ==
- List of constituencies of the Odisha Legislative Assembly
- Kendujhar district
