= Dolia, Odisha =

Dolia
- Village
- Location in Odisha, India Dolia (India)
- Coordinates: 21.133842°N 85.4929785°E
- Country: India
- State: Odisha
- District: Dhenkanal

Government
  - MLA: Nrusingha Charan Sahu
- Elevation: 105 m (344 ft)

Languages
  - Official: Odia
- Time zone: UTC+5:30 (IST)
- PIN: 759028
- Telephone code: 06768-
- Vehicle registration: OR-06/OD-06

Dolia is a village in the Dhenkanal district of the Indian state of Odisha. It is located in the Kankadahad block, and is administered by the Bam panchayat. The village is located 63 km from the district headquarters Dhenkanal. The nearest town is Kamakshyanagar (30 km).

== Geography ==
Dolia is situated at longitude 21.133842 and latitude 85.492978. It is located in the apex of the small river named "Batonai".
