= Champua Assembly constituency =

Constituency of the Odisha legislative assembly in India

Coordinates: 22.07°N 85.66°E

Champua
- Constituency No. 25 for the Odisha Legislative Assembly

Constituency details
- Country: India
- Region: East India
- State: Odisha
- Division: Northern Division
- District: Kendujhar
- Lok Sabha constituency: Keonjhar
- Established: 1951
- Total electors: 2,35,467 (Note: as on 2024) (Note: as data published by election commission)
- Reservation: None

Member of Legislative Assembly
- 17th Odisha Legislative Assembly
- Incumbent Sanatan Mahakud
- Party: Independent
- Elected year: 2024

Champua is a Vidhan Sabha constituency of Kendujhar district.

Area of this constituency includes Joda, Barbil, Joda block and 17 GPs (Kodagadia, Jamudalak, Rajia, Kalikaprasad, Rimuli, Badanai, Sarei, Champua, Kutariposi, Sunaposi, Karanjia, Rangamatia, Uchabali, Bhanda, Kashipal, Padua and Chandrasekharpur) of Champua block.

== Elected members ==
Vote share of winning candidates
2024	56.45%
2019	53.30%
2014	45.50%
2009	22.10%
2004	39.02%
2000	34.70%
1995	40.72%
1990	73.30%
1985	47.42%
1980	35.68%
1977	58.65%

Since its formation in 1951, 17 elections were held till date. It was a 2-member constituency for 1957.

List of members elected from Champua constituency are:

Year	Member	Party
2024	Sanatan Mahakud	Biju Janata Dal
2019	Minakshi Mahanta	Biju Janata Dal
2014	Sanatan Mahakud	Independent politician
2009	Jitu Patnaik	Independent politician
2004	Dhanurjay Sidu	Indian National Congress
2000	Saharai Oram	Independent politician
1995	Dhanurjay Laguri	Indian National Congress
1990	Saharai Oram	Janata Dal
1985	Dhanurjay Laguri	Indian National Congress
1980	Saharai Oram	Janata Party (Secular)
1977	Saharai Oram	Janata Party
1974	Guru Charan Naik	Indian National Congress
1971	Saharai Oram	Utkal Congress
1967	Kshetra Mohan Nayak	Swatantra Party
1961	Guru Charan Naik	Swatantra Party
1957 (Note: It was a 2 member constituency)	Guru Charan Naik	Ganatantra Parishad
1957	Raj Ballabh Mishra	Ganatantra Parishad
1951	Guru Charan Naik	Ganatantra Parishad

== Election results ==
=== 2024 ===
Voting were held on 25 May 2024 in 3rd phase of Odisha Assembly Election & 6th phase of Indian General Election. Counting of votes was on 4 June 2024. In 2024 election, Biju Janata Dal candidate Sanatan Mahakud defeated Bharatiya Janata Party candidate Murli Manohar Sharma by a margin of 39,994 votes.

2024 Odisha Vidhan Sabha Election, Champua
Party	Candidate	Votes	%	±%
BJD	Sanatan Mahakud	103,120	56.45	▲3.15
BJP	Murali Manohar Sharma	63,126	34.56	▼3.04
INC	Yashwant Laghuri	8,649	4.73	▼2.23
BSP	Jayi Munda	1,303	0.71	
NOTA	None of the above	1,343	0.74	▲0.34
Majority		39,994		
Turnout		182,668		
BJD hold				

=== 2019 ===
In 2019 election, Biju Janata Dal candidate Minakshi Mahanta defeated Bharatiya Janata Party candidate Murali Manohar Sharma by a margin of 26,408 votes.

2019 Vidhan Sabha Election, Champua
Party	Candidate	Votes	%	±%
BJD	Minakshi Mahanta	89,525	53.30	▲46.60
BJP	Murali Manohar Sharma	63,117	37.60	▲33.00
INC	Jadumani Barik	4,217	2.50	▲1.00
NOTA	None of the above	750	0.4	
Majority		26,408	15.70	
Turnout		168851	74.45	
BJD gain from Independent				

=== 2014 ===
In 2014 election, Independent candidate Sanatan Mahakud defeated Independent candidate Kusha Apat by a margin of 14678 votes.

2014 Vidhan Sabha Election, Champua
Party	Candidate	Votes	%	±%
Independent	Sanatan Mahakud	69,635	45.50	
Independent	Kusha Apat	54,957	35.90	
BJD	Tattwa Prakash Satapathy	10,233	6.70	
BJP	Girish Chandra Mahanta	7,070	4.60	
INC	Kshetra Mohan Mahanta	2,332	1.50	
Majority		14,678	9.60	
Turnout		156287	78.81	
Independent hold				

=== 2009 ===
In 2009 election, Independent candidate Jitu Patnaik defeated Indian National Congress candidate Sanatan Mahakud by a margin of 145 votes.

2009 Vidhan Sabha Election, Champua
Party	Candidate	Votes	%	±%
Independent	Jitu Patnaik	27,700	22.10	−
INC	Sanatan Mahakud	27,555	21.98	−
Independent	Kusha Apat	26,280	20.96	−
BJP	Murali Manohar Sharma	18,881	15.06	−
CPI	Bidyadhar Mahanta	9,356	7.46	−
Majority		145	0.12 (Note: %of total valid votes)	−
Turnout		1,25,363	66.55	−
Independent gain from INC				
