= Kendujhar =

Town in Odisha, India

Kendujhar Kendujhar
- City
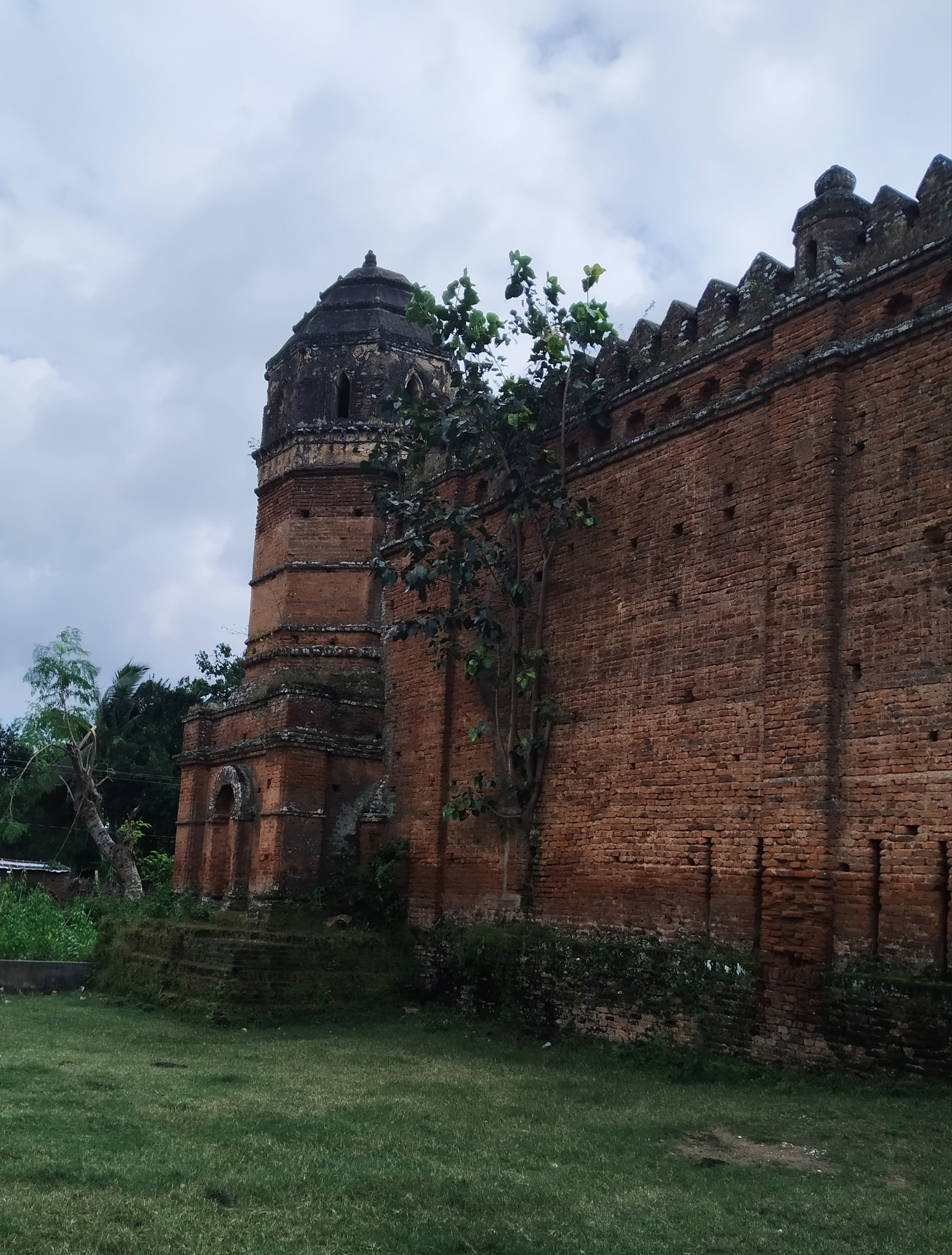
- Kendujhargarh palace

- Location in Odisha, India Kendujhar (India)
- Coordinates: 21.63°N 85.58°E
- Country: India
- State: Odisha
- District: Kendujhar

Area
  - Total: 96.4 km^{2} (37.2 sq mi)
- Elevation: 596 m (1,955 ft)

Population (2011)
  - Total: 57,232
  - Density: 2,295/km^{2} (5,940/sq mi)

Languages
  - Official: Odia
- Time zone: UTC+5:30 (IST)
- PIN: 758001, 758002, 758013
- Vehicle registration: OD-09
- Website: kendujhar.nic.in

Kendujhar is a town with municipality in Kendujhar District in the Indian state of Odisha. It is the administrative headquarters of the district of Kendujhar, and it is one of the fifth scheduled areas of Odisha.

== Climate ==
Climate data for Kendujhar (1991–2020, extremes 1957–2020)
Month	Jan	Feb	Mar	Apr	May	Jun	Jul	Aug	Sep	Oct	Nov	Dec	Year
Record high °C (°F)	34.5 (94.1)	40.4 (104.7)	41.9 (107.4)	44.9 (112.8)	47.4 (117.3)	44.5 (112.1)	37.1 (98.8)	37.2 (99.0)	38.9 (102.0)	37.4 (99.3)	33.4 (92.1)	32.9 (91.2)	47.4 (117.3)
Mean daily maximum °C (°F)	26.2 (79.2)	29.7 (85.5)	33.8 (92.8)	37.2 (99.0)	37.3 (99.1)	33.6 (92.5)	30.2 (86.4)	29.9 (85.8)	30.4 (86.7)	29.9 (85.8)	28.1 (82.6)	26.1 (79.0)	31.1 (88.0)
Mean daily minimum °C (°F)	11.4 (52.5)	14.8 (58.6)	18.7 (65.7)	22.3 (72.1)	23.7 (74.7)	24.0 (75.2)	23.4 (74.1)	23.1 (73.6)	22.4 (72.3)	19.9 (67.8)	15.4 (59.7)	11.5 (52.7)	19.3 (66.7)
Record low °C (°F)	3.0 (37.4)	2.7 (36.9)	8.7 (47.7)	10.4 (50.7)	14.7 (58.5)	12.2 (54.0)	13.2 (55.8)	15.6 (60.1)	10.2 (50.4)	7.2 (45.0)	7.9 (46.2)	2.2 (36.0)	2.2 (36.0)
Average rainfall mm (inches)	16.7 (0.66)	18.8 (0.74)	25.9 (1.02)	51.9 (2.04)	110.0 (4.33)	232.8 (9.17)	283.8 (11.17)	305.0 (12.01)	230.8 (9.09)	113.6 (4.47)	21.5 (0.85)	8.7 (0.34)	1,419.4 (55.88)
Average rainy days	1.3	1.4	1.9	4.1	6.6	11.6	14.8	15.1	13.0	5.9	1.3	0.8	77.8
Average relative humidity (%) (at 17:30 IST)	49	41	36	34	47	69	82	84	84	75	65	55	60
Source: India Meteorological Department

== Politics ==
Mohan Charan Majhi of BJP is the current CM of Odisha who has been elected from Keonjhar assembly constituency. Majhi won assembly elections in both 2004 and 2000. Earlier MLAs from this seat were Jogendra Naik of BJP (1995), C. Majhi of JD (1990), Chhotaray Majhi of JNP (1985), Jogendra Naik of INC(I) in 1980 and Kumar Majhi of JNP (1977).

Present MP from Keonjhar (Lok Sabha constituency) is Ananta Nayak of BJP.

== Gallery ==
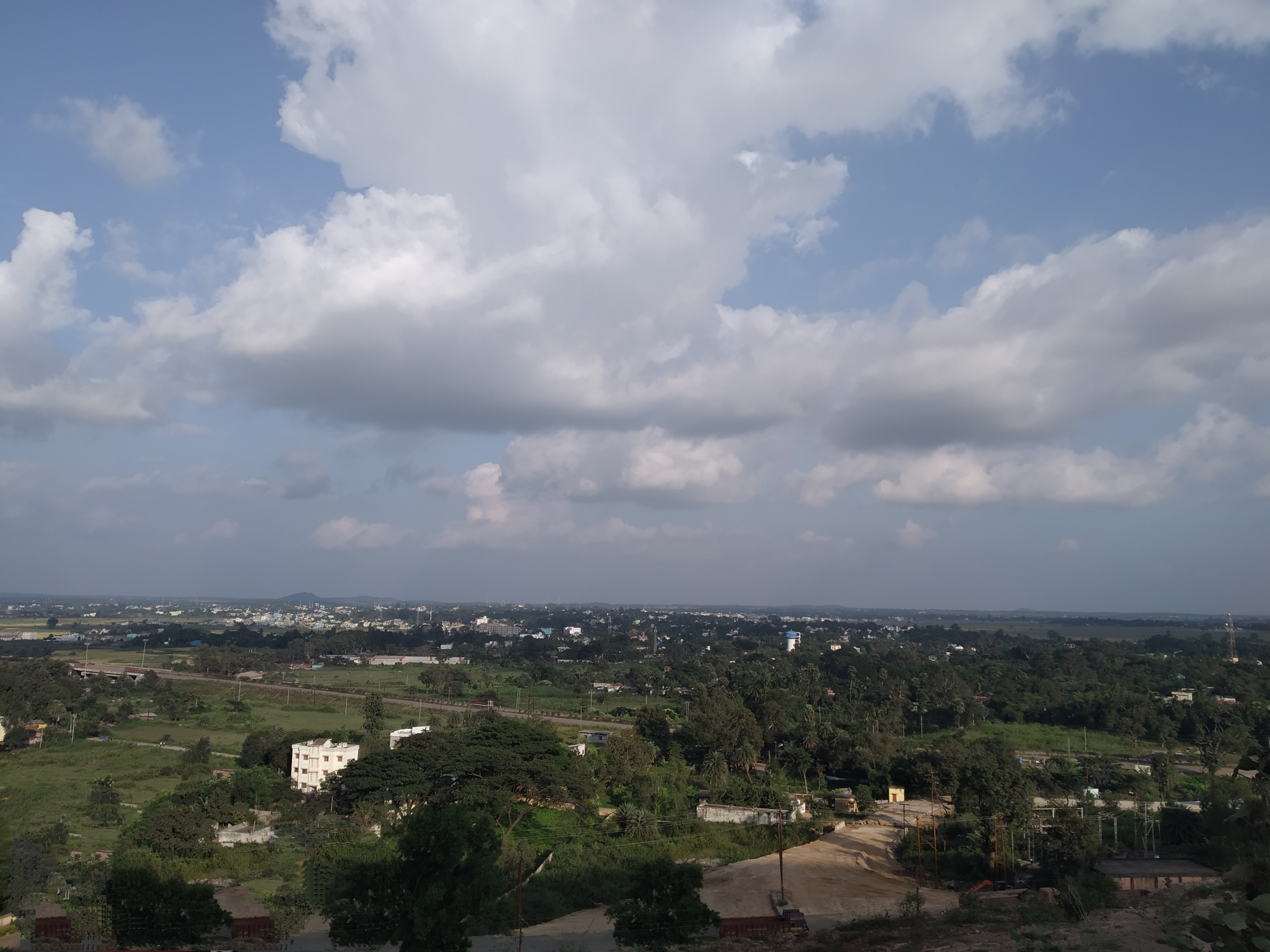
Keonjhar seen from above

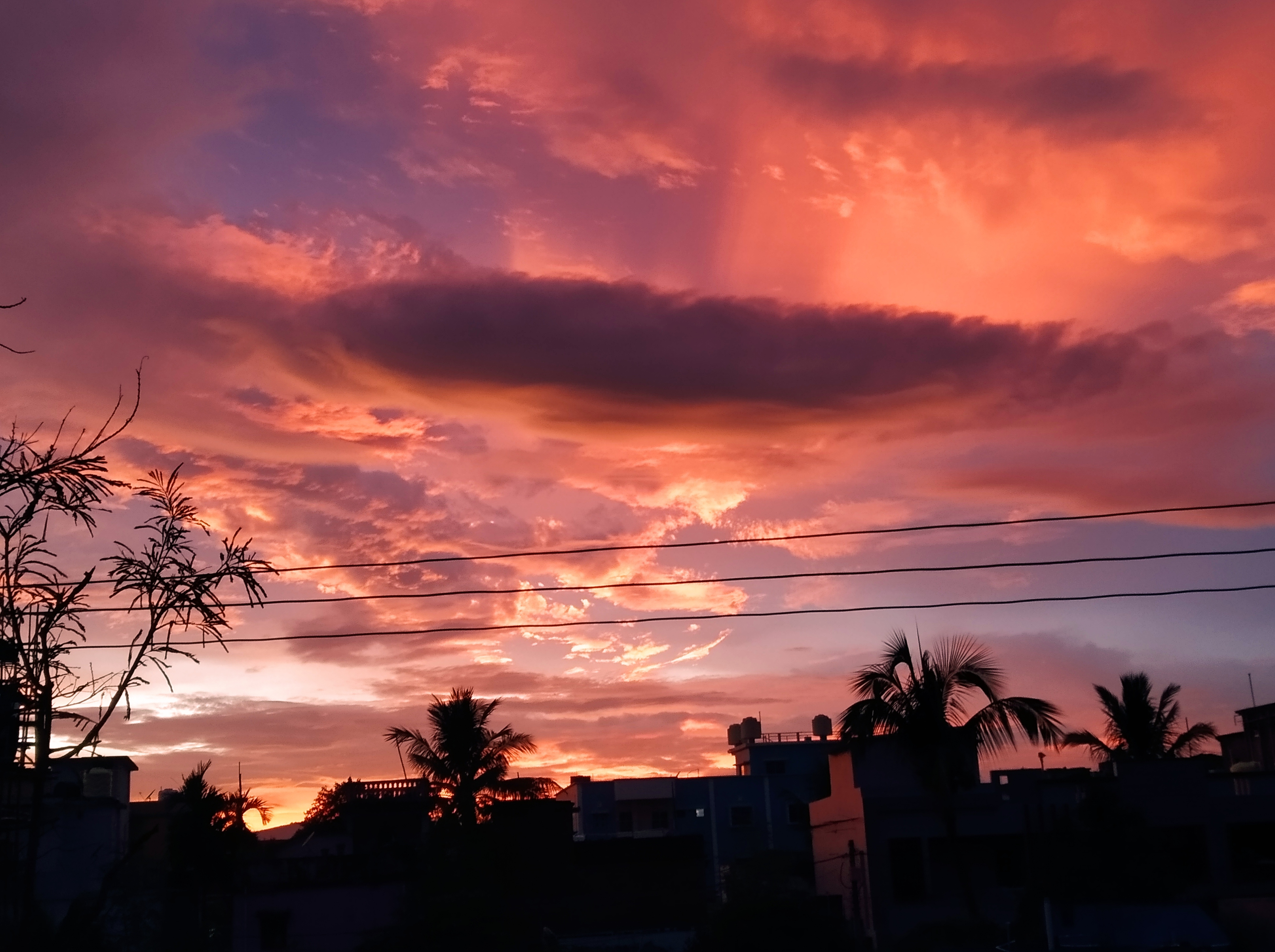
Sunset in Keonjhar
