= Kendujhar district =

Kendujhar district Keonjhar district
- District of Odisha
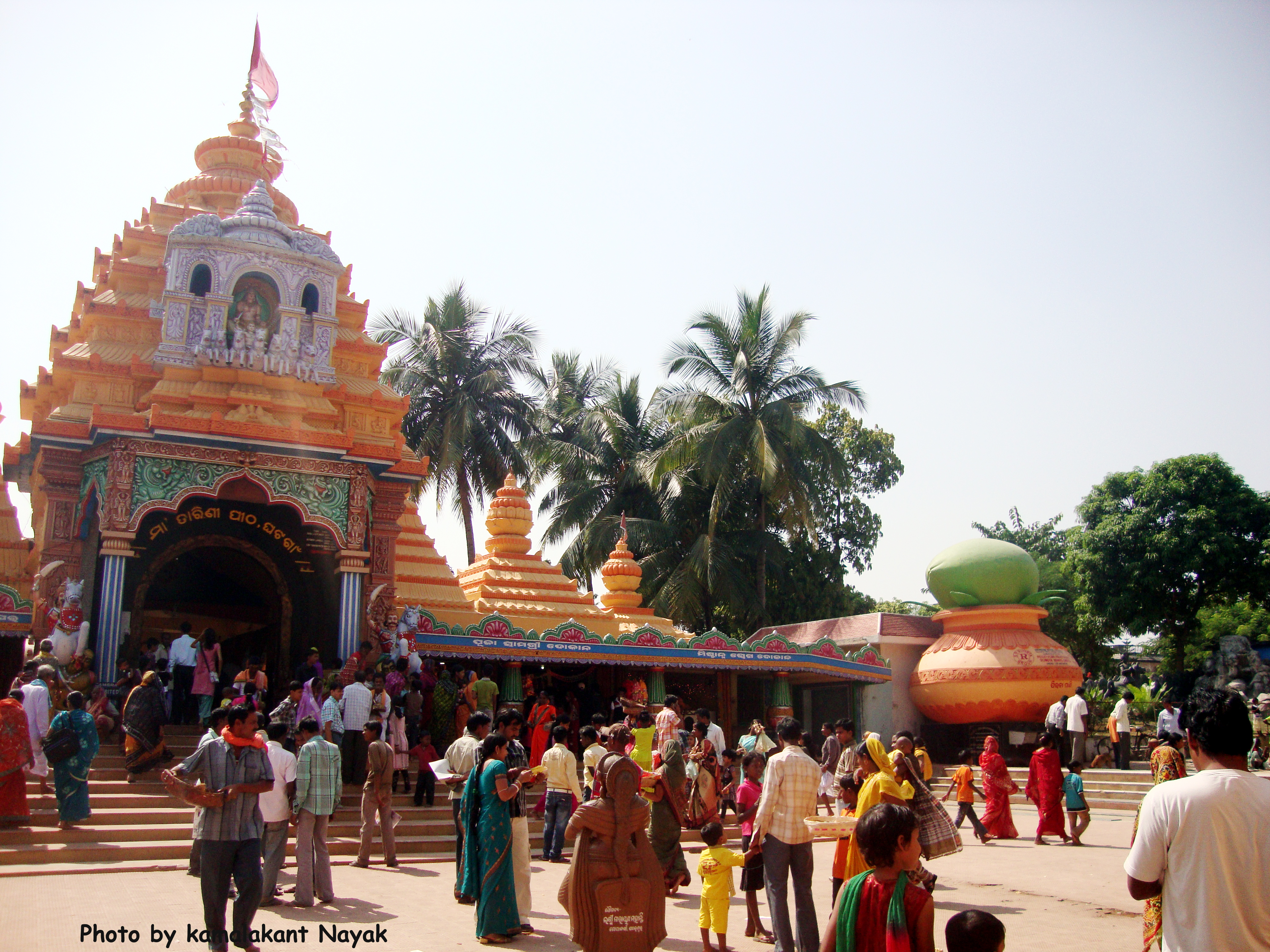
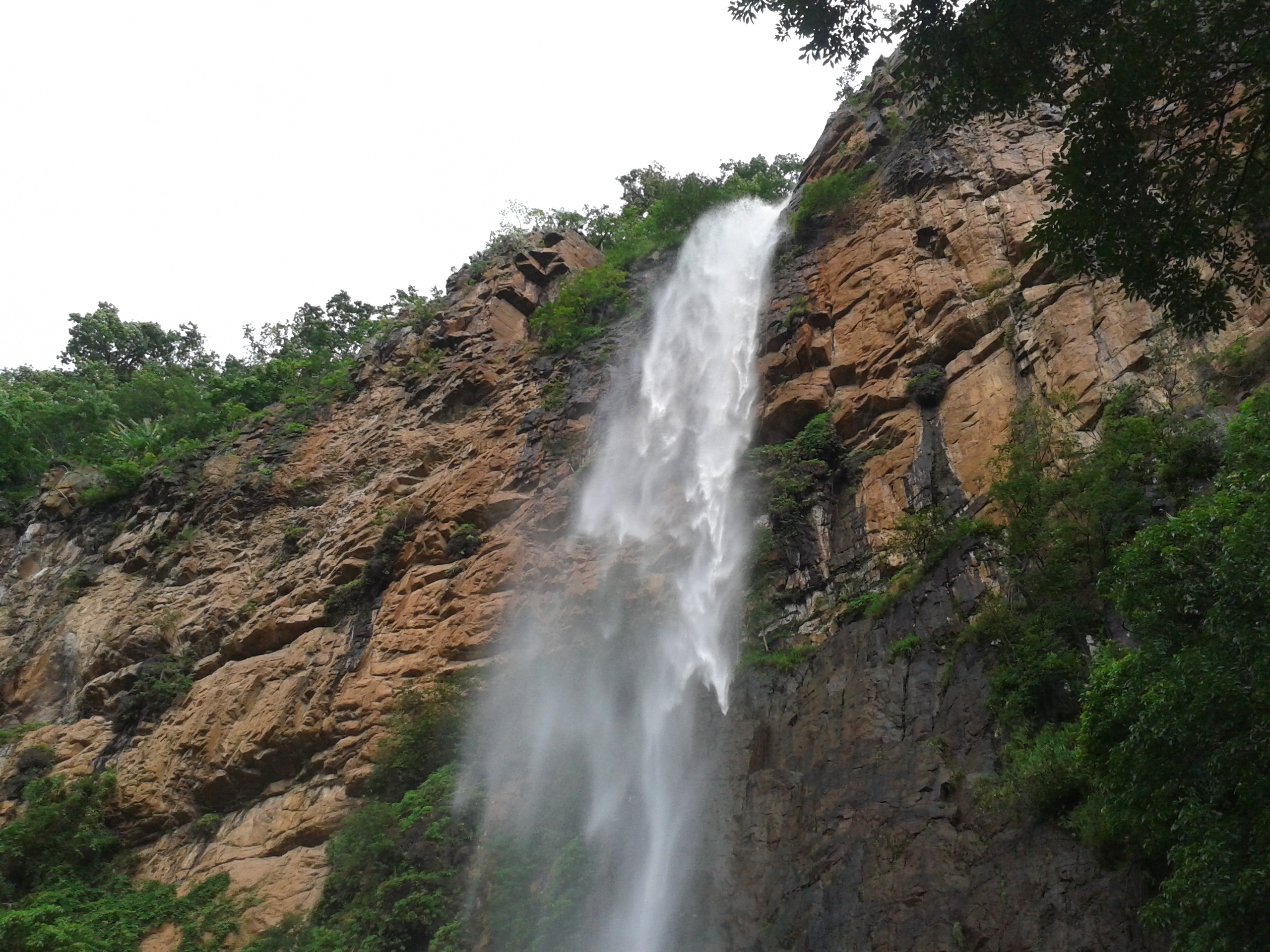
- Top: Maa Tarini Temple in Ghatgaon; Bottom: Khandadhar Falls

- Location in Odisha
- Coordinates: 21.633°N 85.6°E
- Country: India
- State: Odisha
- Headquarters: Kendujhar

Government
  - Collector & District Magistrate: Vishal Singh, IAS
  - Divisional Forest Officer Cum Wildlife Warden: Dhanraj Hanumant Dhamdhere, IFS
  - Superintendent of Police: Kusalkar Nitin Dagudu, IPS

Area
  - Total: 8,303 km^{2} (3,206 sq mi)
- Elevation: 480 m (1,570 ft)

Population (2011)
  - Total: 1,801,733
  - Rank: 8
  - Density: 217.0/km^{2} (562.0/sq mi)

Languages
  - Official: Odia, English
  - Local: Ho, Munda, Juang
- Time zone: UTC+5:30 (IST)
- PIN: 758 xxx
- Vehicle registration: OD-09
- Sex ratio: 0.987 ♂/♀
- Literacy: 69%
- Lok Sabha constituency: Keonjhar(ST)
- Vidhan Sabha constituency: 7: 020-Telkoi(ST) 021-Ghasipura 022-Anandapur(SC) 023-Patna(ST) 024-Keonjhar(ST) 025-Champua 030-Karanjia (ST)
- Climate: Aw (Köppen)
- Precipitation: 1,535.5 millimetres (60.45 in)
- Website: kendujhar.odisha.gov.in

Kendujhar district, also known as Keonjhar district, is an administrative district of Odisha. The district is one of the fifth Scheduled Areas of Odisha. The town of Kendujhar (or Kendujhargarh) is the district headquarters. The district has three sub-divisions, Anandapur, Champua, and Kendujhar.

== Etymology ==
Origin of the name Keonjhar/Kendujhar is not certain. Locals pronounce the name as Kenjhar. In medieval Sanskrit inscriptions the name "Kenjhar" is found. The name has been Sanskritised to Kendujhar by the ex-Durbar government. The name Kendujhar is derived from "Kendu", meaning East Indian Ebony (tree which is abundant in the district) and "Jhar" meaning water spring. In colonial records, the district name variously noted as Comgur, Konjoor, Koonjoor, Keunjur, and Keunjhar.

== History ==
Early history of Kendujhar is not certain. Nagas of Vindhyatabi ruled Keonjhar during the second century CE to fourth century CE and Satrubhanja was famous king of the dynasty. In Sitabhinji, fresco paintings were found in the cave shelter of Ravana Chhaya, which date to the fifth century A.D.

The district of Kendujhar functioned as a princely state before its amalgamation with Orissa, its early historical accounts remaining enigmatic. Cobden-Ramsay delineated a segment of Upper Kendujhar, amalgamating it with Mayurbhanj to establish the entity known as Hariharpur. This geographical entity likely constituted a component of the ancient Khijjinga territory, which had its headquarters at Khijjinga Kota, now identified as modern Khiching. It evolved into an independent state during the early half of the 12th century A.D., under the rulership of Jyoti Bhanja.

Preceding the reign of Jyoti Bhanja, Kendujhar's territorial jurisdiction encompassed solely the northern precinct of the contemporary district. In the latter part of the 15th century, under the governance of King Govinda Bhanja, Kendujhar extended its territorial boundaries from Singhbhum in the north to Sukinda (a Zamindari situated in Cuttack district) in the south. It also extended from Mayurbhanj in the east to the perimeters of the States of Bonai, Pal-lahara, and Dhenkanal in the west. During Pratap Balabhadra Bhanja's rule (1764-1792 A.D.), two small areas, Tillo and Jujhpada, were acquired from the Zamindar of Kantajhari and incorporated into the State. These additions received official recognition in the 1804 Sanad granted by the East India Company to Raja Janardan Bhanja. After the merger with Orissa, for administrative reasons, Tillo (7.51 sq. km.) and Jujhpada (9.06 sq. km.) were transferred to Baleshwar and Cuttack districts, respectively. Additionally, the Ambo group of villages (14.84 sq. km.) from Baleshwar district became part of Kendujhar district.

There were several chiefs of this Gadjat State until Raja Janardan Bhanja signed a treaty with East India Company. This recognised the title of Raja by British Government. There was a succession dispute when the then Raja died without a legitimate heir in 1861. This dispute was finally over with a multiparty compromise with Dhanurjaya Bhanja being crowned king in 1868. However, there was a rebellion that broke out soon after led by Ratna Naik and a few other tribals. This rebellion was quelled with the help of British Police. There was another tribal uprising in 1891 under the leadership of Dharanidhar Naik against oppressive practices such as bonded labour. This was known as "Dharani Meli". The Raja had to flee to Cuttack and the rebellion was again quelled by British forces.

Post Indian Independence in 1947 the whole of Keonjhar State was integrated into the State of Odisha (then Orissa) by "The Administration of Orissa States Orders, 1948". It became one of the 13 districts of the State.

== Geography ==
Keonjhar is a landlocked district situated in the northern part of Orissa. It is bounded by Mayurbhanj, Balasore and Bhadrak district to the east, Jajpur district to the south, Dhenkanal, Anugul and Sundargarh district to the west, and West Singhbhum district to the north.

The district of Keonjhar is highly rich in mineral resources and has vast deposits of iron, manganese and chromium ores. About 30% of the district's total area is covered with tracts of dense forests. Keonjhar also contains one of the oldest rock formations in the world, which covers an area of 100 km^{2}.

=== Topography ===
On the eastern half of the district are the plains of Anandapur. To the west is a range of hills containing peaks such as Gandhamardan (3477 ft), Mankadnacha (3639 ft), Gonasika (3219 ft) and Thakurani (3003 ft)

About half of the area of this district is covered by forests of Northern tropical deciduous type trees which include Sal, Asan, Jamu, Arjuna, Kusum, Kangada, Mahua, Mango, Kendu.

The highlands consist of clusters of rugged crags and the mountaintops appear to be sharply ridged or peaked, however they have extensive tablelands on their summits. In some areas, isolated hills rise abruptly from the plains, but most areas have a general elevation of over 600m. The highlands form the watershed for a number of rivers, including the Baitarani River.

=== Nomira national geological monument ===
Pillow Lava in lron ore belt at Nomira 2 km east of Nomira 18 km from 18 km south of Joda town, on the Keonjhar-Barbil-Lahunipada state highway, has been declared the National Geological Monuments of India by the Geological Survey of India (GSI), for their protection, maintenance, promotion and enhancement of geotourism. Pillow Lava, Iron ore belt of Nomira is an exposure of ellipsoidal pillow lava of a maximum thickness of 2m x 0.6m. The fine to medium grained, green to bluish green coloured with abundant Vesicular texture filled with quartz. The lavas and the associated pyroclastic rocks and tuffs are underlain by quartzite and overlain by shale, chart-shale and banded hematite jasper.

The site can be reached from Joda by following Joda Nayagar road up to Bamebari and then following a 2 km unmetalled road leading eastward up to Nomira.

=== Climate ===
The temperature in the district begins to rise rapidly in the spring with the highest temperatures recorded in the month of May usually go up to 38 °C. The maximum recorded temperature however is 43.3 °C. The weather cools during the monsoon in June and remains cool until the end of October. The temperature in the month of December can drop down to 7 °C. The minimum temperature recorded was 1 °C. The average annual rainfall is 1910.1 mm.

== Economy ==
Keonjhar is part of the Singhbhum-Keonjhar-Banei iron belt. This belt stretches about 50 km and around 14.5 km lie within Kendujhar District. Daitari hills that border Kendujhar and Jajpur district is home to high grade of Iron ore. Odisha Mining Corporation along with TISCO and Bolani Mines Private Ltd run iron ore mines in Kendujhar. In addition there are many medium and small scale mining operations in Barbil/Joda area. Keonjhar also has abundant manganese and Chromite deposits. Kendujhar supplies around 80% of Odisha's manganese production. The manganese mines are at Banspani, Barbil and Barjamda while the Chromite mines are at Baula, Nuasahi and Phulinjhorhuli.

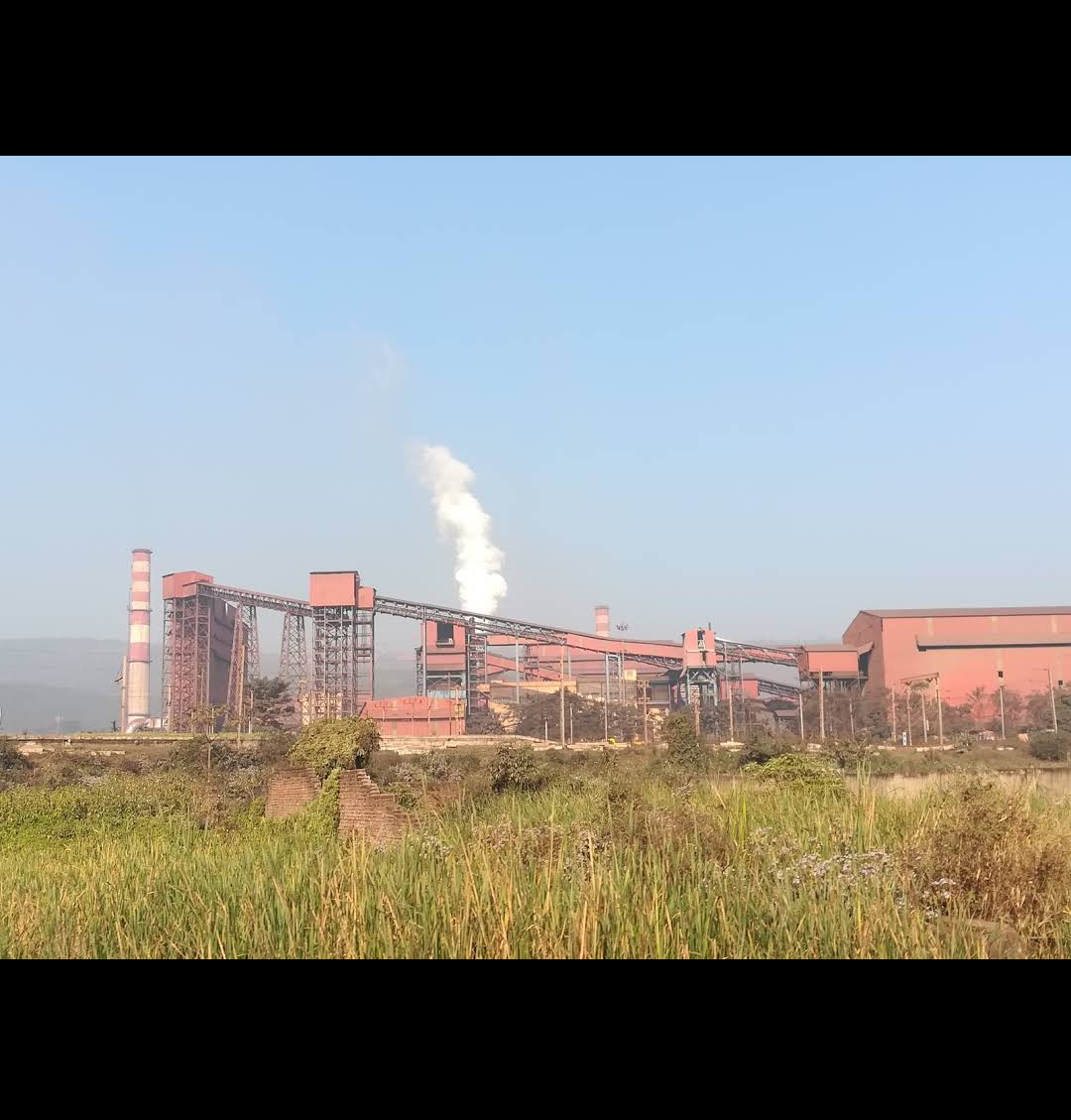
Jspl pellet plant

2006 the Ministry of Panchayati Raj named Kendujhar one of the country's 250 most backward districts. The district is one of the 19 districts in Orissa currently receiving funds from the Backward Regions Grant Fund Programme (BRGF).

As per the Mines and Minerals (Development & Regulation) Act of 2015 the district is set to receive aid from mining companies and lease holders.

== Administration ==
- Subdivisions- 03, 1. Anandapur, 2. Champua, 3. Kendujhar (sadar)
- Tehsils- 13
- Blocks- 13: Anandapur, Banspal, Champua, Ghasipura, Ghatgaon, Harichandanpur, Hatadihi, Jhumpura, Joda, Keonjhar, Patna, Saharpada, Telkoi
- Revenue Circles- 50
- Gram Panchayats- 287
- Sub-Registrar Office- 06
- Police Stations- 25
- Towns(Urban Areas)- 09
- Municipalities- 04: 1. Anandapur, 2. Barbil, 3. Kendujhar, 4. Joda
- NAC- 01 Champua
- Census Town- 04: 1.Bolani, 2.Jajanga, 3.Jhumpura, 4.Daitari
- Inhabited Villages- 2135
- Fire Stations- 13
- District Jail/ Special Jail- 01
- Sub-Jails- 02
- Agricultural Districts- 03
- ICDS Projects- 14
- Treasury/SubTreasury- 07
- HQ.Hospital/Hospitals- 04
- Community Health Centre/UGPHC- 17
- Public Health Centre- 81
- Sub Centre (Health)- 351

== Demographics ==
Historical population
Year	Pop.	±%
1901	285,758	—
1911	364,702	+27.6%
1921	379,496	+4.1%
1931	460,609	+21.4%
1941	529,786	+15.0%
1951	588,441	+11.1%
1961	743,315	+26.3%
1971	955,514	+28.5%
1981	1,114,622	+16.7%
1991	1,337,026	+20.0%
2001	1,561,990	+16.8%
2011	1,801,733	+15.3%
Source: Census of India

Religions in Kendujhar district (2011)
Religion	Per cent
Hinduism	97.28%
Islam	1.54%
Christianity	0.51%
Sarna	0.41%
Other or not stated	0.26%

According to the 2011 census, Kendujhar district has a population of 1,801,733. It is the 264th most populous district in India. The district has a population density of 217 inhabitants per square kilometre (560/sq mi). The district's population growth rate over the decade 2001–2011 was 15.42%. Kendujhar has a sex ratio of 987 females for every 1000 males, and a literacy rate of 69%. 14.05% of the population lives in urban areas. Scheduled Castes and Scheduled Tribes make up 11.62% and 45.45% of the population.

The concentration of Scheduled Tribes is the highest in the Keonjhar subdivision and lowest in the Anandapur subdivision. The majority of Scheduled Tribes members are employed in agriculture, mining, or quarrying. The literacy among the Scheduled Tribes was 15.25% in the 1981 census but it has increased to 24.89% in the 1991 census. This percentage is higher than the State average of 22.31%.

=== Tribes and communities ===
Kendujhar district, situated in the state of Odisha, is categorized as a Scheduled Area. According to the 2011 census, the Scheduled population accounts for 57.06% of the state's total population. The district has significant representation of Scheduled Castes and Scheduled Tribes. The major Scheduled Castes in Kendujhar district, along with their respective percentages within the total Scheduled Caste population of 209,357, are as follows: Pano (59.9%), Dhoba (13.59%), Keuta (4.23%), Dom (4.11%), Ghasi (3.27%), Haddi (2.25%), Pantanti (2.07%), Patratanti (1.53%), Gokha (1.12%), and Tamudia (0.94%). Similarly, the major Scheduled Tribes in the district, with their respective percentages within the total Scheduled Tribe population of 801,878, include Ho (30.77%), Bhuiyan (12.70%), Gond (9.86%), Bathudi (9.65%), Sounti (8.89%), Santal (8.8%), Munda (5.97%), Juang (3.27%), Lodha (3.21%), Bhumij (1.76%), Soura (1.18%), Mirdha (0.63%).

=== Languages ===
Languages of Kendujhar district (2011)
1. Odia (78.9%)
2. Ho (8.09%)
3. Santali (3.77%)
4. Hindi (2.66%)
5. Mundari (1.69%)
6. Juang (1.29%)
7. Urdu (0.93%)
8. Others (2.69%)

At the time of the 2011 Census of India, 78.88% of the population in the district spoke Odia, 8.09% Ho, 3.77% Santali, 2.66% Hindi, 1.69% Mundari, 1.29% Juang and 0.93% Urdu as their first language.

Around 30% of the tribals belong to the Ho people and they speak the Ho language. Other languages include Bhunjia, which is spoken by approximately 7000 Bhunjia Adivasis. Only Bhunjia Tribal communities also speak Odia as a secondary language and other tribal communities uses their own mother tongues.

== Culture and heritage ==
The culture of Keonjhar district is mainly tribal culture of different tribes residing in this district. The district administration recognised important tribal festivals among which are the festivals of Sohrai, Gaumara Parab, Sarhul, Mage Parab, Baa Parab, Hermuutu, Heroh Parab, Karam Parab, Jomnama Parab, Jomsuim, Uda Parab, and Baruni Jatra and Bhoji Bhaata.

=== Folk dance ===
The district has large sections of tribal communities. So, there are many folk dances such as Ho, Juang and Changu dances which are popular and recognised by the district administration.

=== Ho Dance ===
This dance is performed by the Ho speaking tribe mainly during Mage Porob in the month of November–January.

=== Juang Dance ===
Juang dance is performed by the Juang tribe of this district.

== Politics ==
=== Vidhan sabha constituencies ===
The following is the 6 Vidhan sabha constituencies of Kendujhar district and the elected members of that area.

No.	Constituency	Reservation	Extent of the Assembly Constituency (Blocks)	Member of 15th Assembly	Party
20	Telkoi	ST	Harichandanpur, Telkoi, Banspal (Part)	Premananda Naik	BJD
21	Ghasipura	None	Ghasipura, Ghatagaon, Anandpur (part)	Badri Narayan Patra	BJD
22	Anandapur	SC	Anandapur (M), Hatadihi, Anandapur (part)	Abhimanyu Sethi	BJD
23	Patna	ST	Patna, Saharpada, Jhumpura (part), Champua (part)	Jagannath Naik	BJD
24	Keonjhar	ST	Keonjhar (M), Keonjhar, Jhumpura (part), Bansapal (Part)	Mohan Majhi	BJP
25	Champua	None	Joda (M), Barbil (M), Joda, Champua (part)	Meenakshi Mahanta	BJD

== Gallery ==
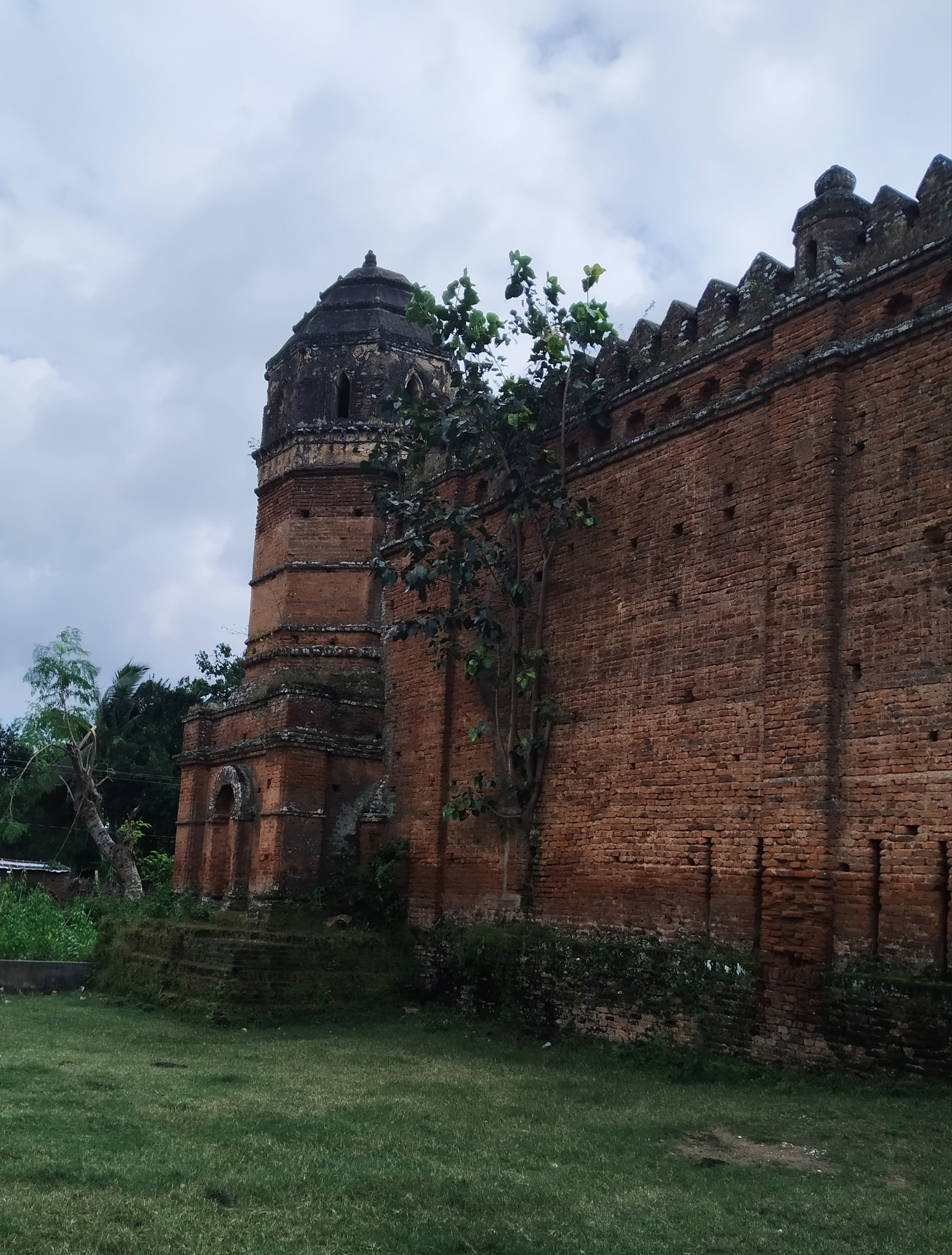
Kendujhargarh palace walls.

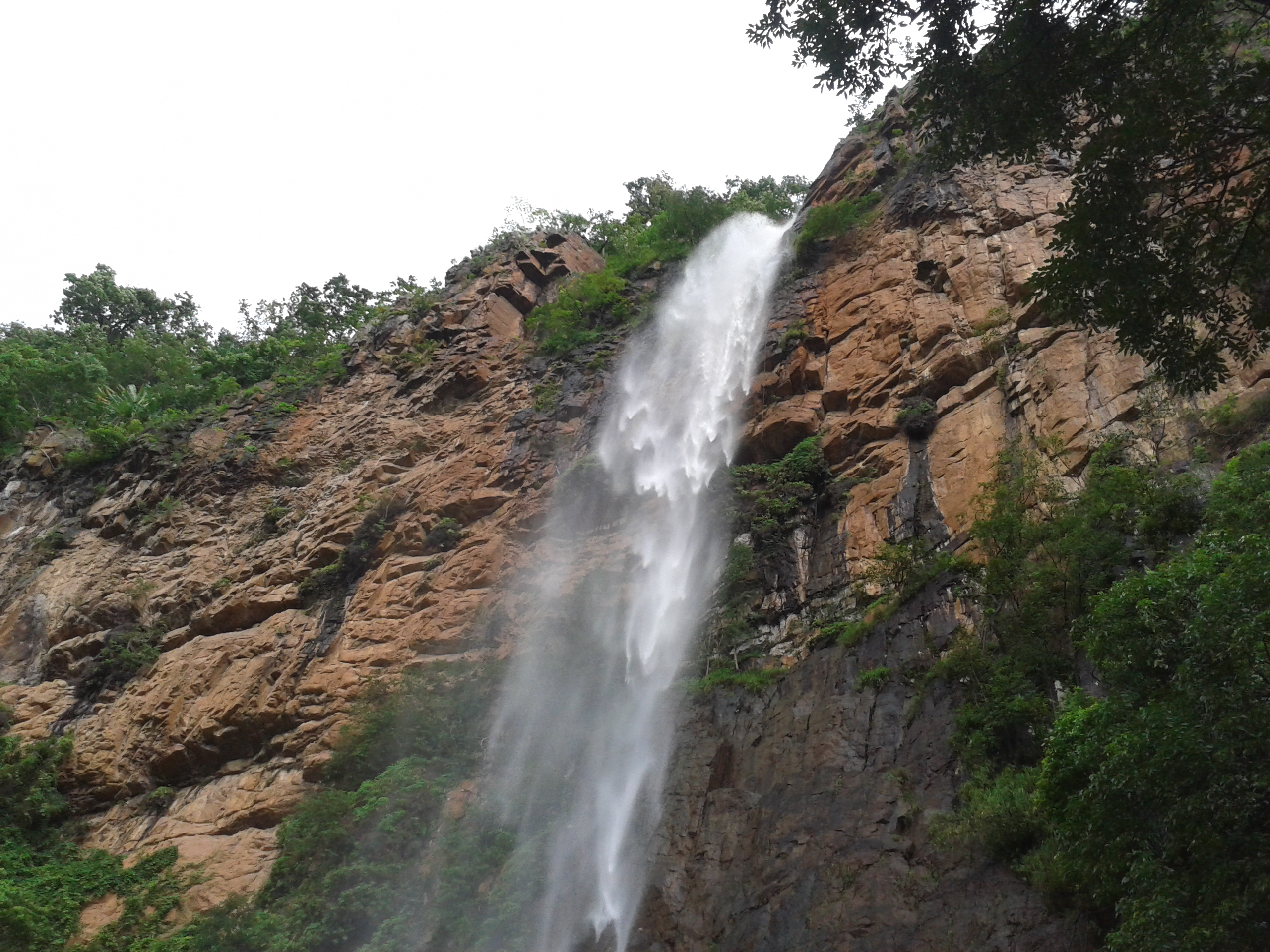
Khandadhar waterfalls

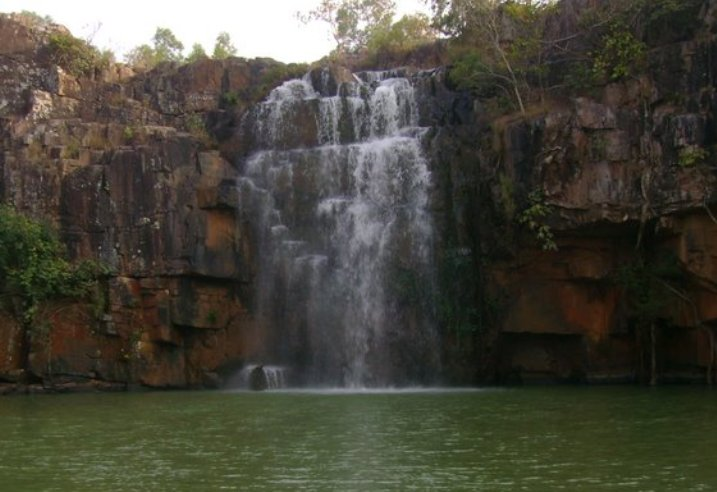
Badaghaghra waterfall, Keonjhar

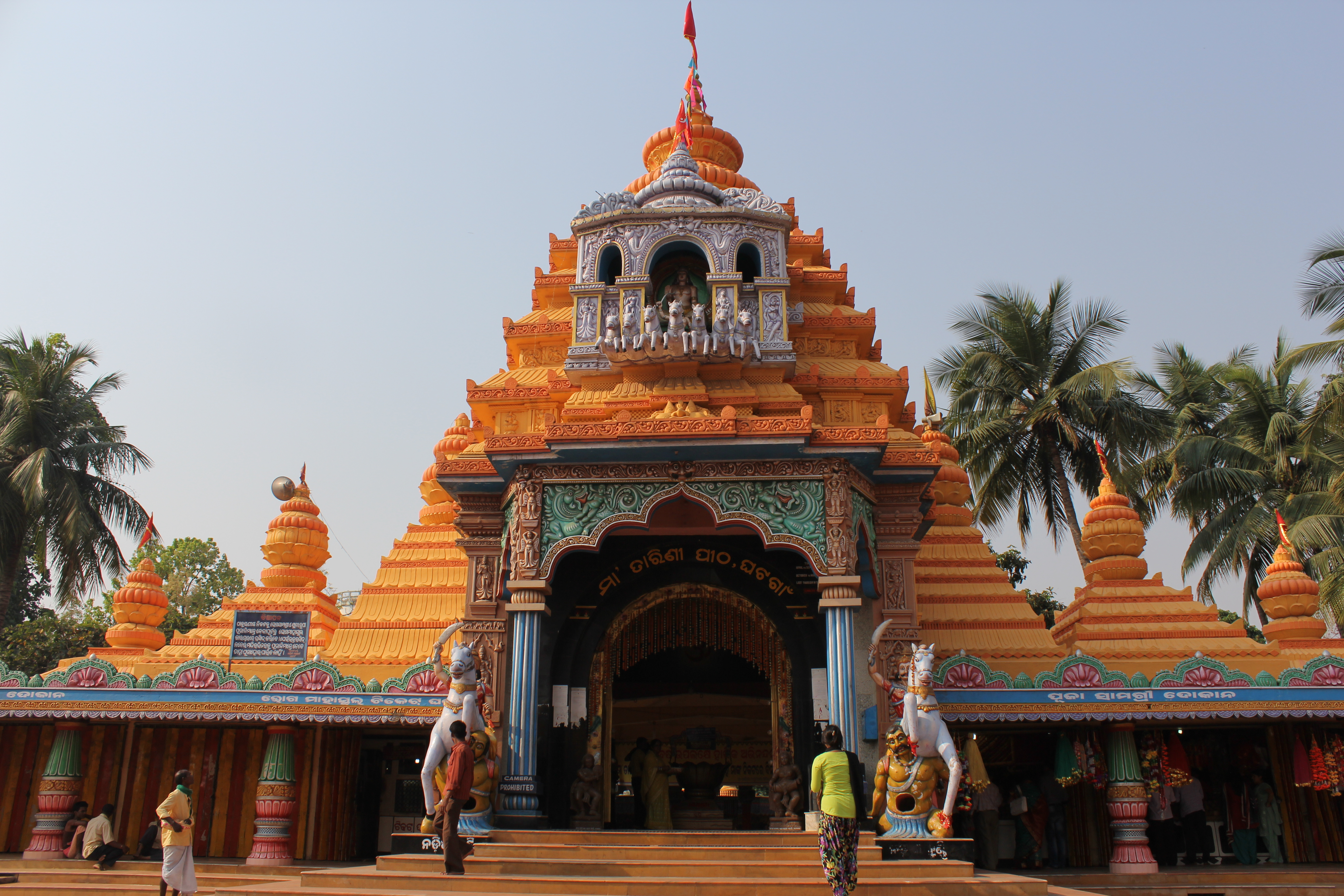
Ghatagaon Tarini temple
