= Bwizamani Singh =

Indian camera operator (1976–2012)

- Born: ca. 1976
- Died: December 23, 2012 (aged 36); Imphal, Manipur
- Cause of death: Gunshot
- Occupation: Journalist
- Employer: Prime News

Bwizamani Singh, who was also mistakenly identified as Dwijamani Singh, (ca. 1976 – 23 December 2012), was an Indian camera operator for the Prime News channel in northeast India. He was shot dead by police while covering a protest of recent sexual violence against women in India.

== Personal ==
Bwizamani Singh had two children, a son and a daughter. He also had a brother named Thangjam Tulchand Singh.

His funeral was held in Imphal, India on 25 December 2012.

== Career ==
Bwizamani Singh was a camera man for Prime News, a satellite-distributed television channel in northeast India.

== Death ==
Imphal is located in India and shown relative to the capital New Delhi.

Singh was killed on 23 December 2012 while covering a protest of the recent violence against Indian women in Imphal, Manipur, India. Police opened fire in attempt to disperse an angry crowd in Imphal. Singh was recording a mob burning a truck at the protest when police began firing into the crowd. Five officers were suspended as a result of the incident. Singh was taken to a local hospital where he later died from a gunshot wound to the chest.

== Context ==
The protest Singh was covering at the time of his death was in reaction to two assaults on women. The first was an attack on a local actress called Momoko, who was attacked by a man who climbed on stage and repeatedly kicked her during a fundraising event. The other was the fatal gang-rape of a 23-year-old female student by six men on a bus in New Delhi. In that incident, the victim had three abdominal operations and went into cardiac arrest.

The protesters at Imphal were demanding the arrest of the man who attacked Manipuri actress Momoko at a local high school. The attacker was Lt. Col. Living-stone, also written as Livingstone or Living Stone, a militant member of a Naga separatist group National Socialist Council of Nagaland. The separatist leader also shot at at least one person who tried to defend the actress before he fled.

The protests in 2012 were national, but the recent protests had led to violence and police enforced curfews in parts of Manipur afterwards. Kavita Krishnan, secretary of the All India Progressive Women's Association that is affiliated with the Communist Party of India (Marxist–Leninist) Liberation, believes the culture of victim-blaming surrounding sex crimes is the deeper issue behind the protests in Indian. Some Indian officials have insisted that a person cannot be prosecuted for rape if they know their victims. Reporting rape in India can endanger the one who reports and the victim of the crime. It is estimated that thousands of rapes occur annually in India but only 600 are reported. This is likely due to how the cases are handled and the widely held belief that behaviors of women may invite rape. This mentality promoting rape culture is not considered a distinctly Indian issue, but a worldwide issue.

== Impact ==
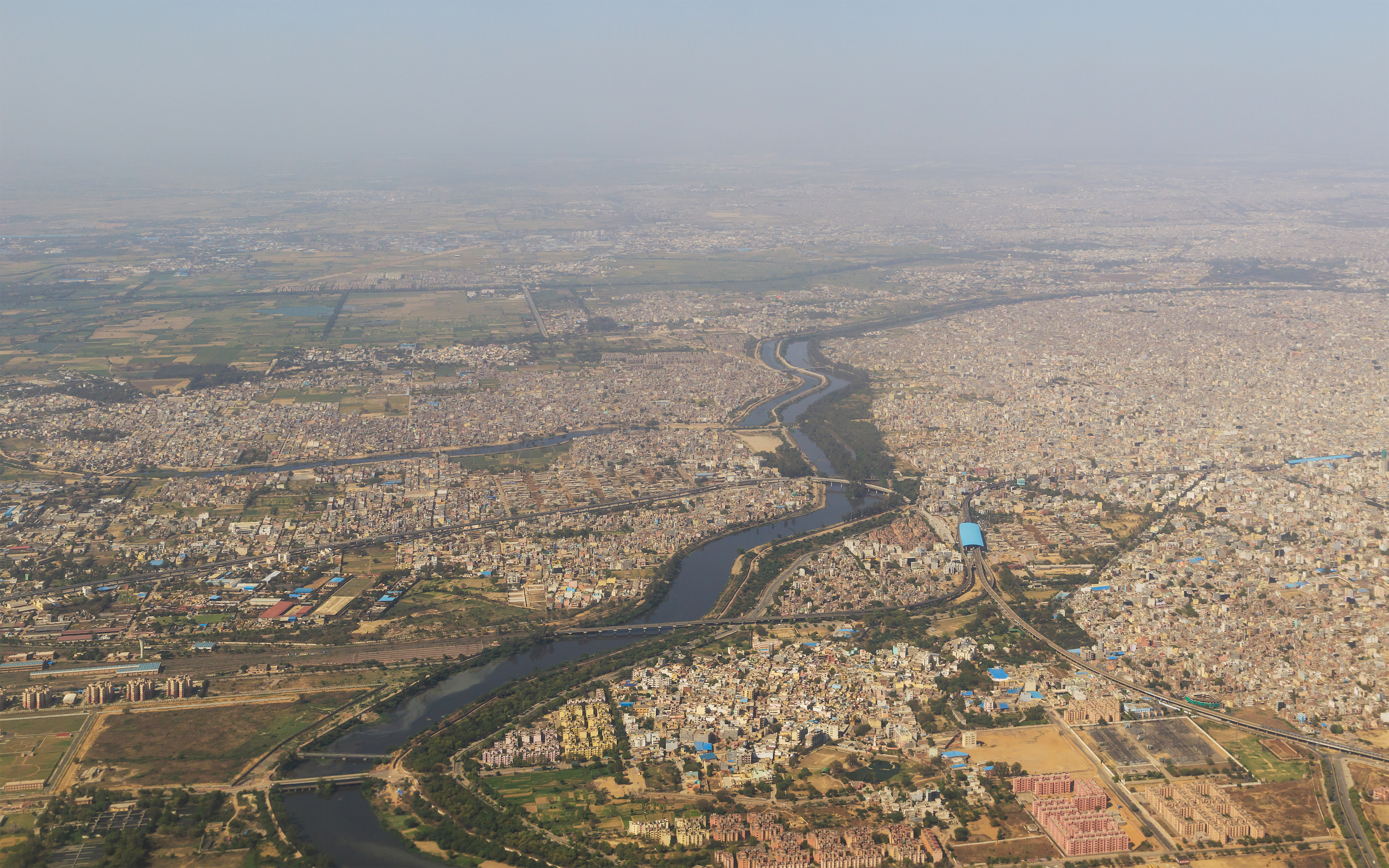
Aerial view of Delhi, India, where the gang rape that sparked protests took place.

The circumstances of Singh's death led to Indian officials being questioned about police response to such events. The protest was one of many that took place around this time to combat the high rate of sexual violence in India. The gang-rape that sparked this demonstration has created greater demand for the security of women. The government ordered an inquiry into the handling of rape cases. The men accused of the gang rape have been charged with murder.

== Reactions ==
Bob Dietz, Asia program coordinator for the Committee to Protect Journalists, said, "Indian officials must fully explain the circumstances of this killing, and hold all of those responsible fully accountable. It is the only way to improve the police response to such public outcries in the future."

William Horsley, Centre for Freedom of the Media at the University of Sheffield, said, "What is needed is the public and the press to make the world's populations understand the link between the killing of journalists and the undermining of the rule of law and stability in whole societies."
