= All India Kisan Mahasabha =

Indian political organisation

- Abbreviation: AIKM
- Legal status: Active
- Region served: India
- President: Ruldu Singh Mansa
- General secretary: Raja Ram Singh Kushwaha
- Vice President: Prem Singh Gehlawat
- Affiliations: • Communist Party of India (Marxist-Leninist) Liberation

The All India Kisan Mahasabha (AIKM) is the peasants' front of the Communist Party of India (Marxist-Leninist) Liberation, and works for farmers' rights and the anti-feudal movement in India. AIKM and AIKM's Punjab-based farmers' union Punjab Kishan Union have played one of the biggest roles on 2020-21 farmers' protest.

== National affiliations ==
AIKM is one of the biggest farmers' unions of India. AIKM and Punjab Kishan Union are nationally affiliated with All India Kisan Sangharsh Coordination Committee (AIKSCC).

== National Conference of AIKM ==
The third National Conference of the All India Kisan Mahasabha was held on June 9 through 10th, 2017 in Jharkhand's Hazaribagh town (named Birsa Nagar after the great Birsa Munda for the occasion) in the Town Hall (named Mahendra Singh Sabhagar after Comrade Mahendra Singh).

464 delegates and 30 guests and observers from all states participated in the Conference. It was at Hazaribagh, on April 15, 2014, as BJP's prime ministerial candidate, that Narendra Modi had promised a profitable minimum support price to farmers. Farmers from all over India, at the AIKM's Hazaribagh conference pointed out that bullets are being unleashed on farmers asking Modi to keep his promise.

On the occasion of the Conference, AIKM and CPI(ML) leaders garlanded the statue of the Great Birsa Munda at Birsa Chowk, from where peasants and adivasis held an impressive March through the main market of the town, raising slogans in support of ongoing farmers' and adivasis' movements and against the firing on peasants and adivasis in Madhya Pradesh and Jharkhand.

At the Conference hall, AIKM's senior-most Vice President Devendra Chauhan hoisted the organisation's flag and tribute was paid to martyrs of peasant movements including those killed at Badkagaon and Mandsaur.

Comrade Dipankar Bhattacharya, General Secretary of the CPI(ML) inaugurated the Conference, and was the main speaker at the open session conducted by AIKM General Secretary Rajaram Singh. Guests at the conference who addressed the open session included Asar Ali, President of the Bangladesh Biplavi Krishak Samiti; poet and Jan Sanskriti Manch Vice President Shambhu Badal, Comrade Rameshwar Prasad, President of AIARLA; AIKM President Ruldu Singh, CPI(ML)'s Jharkhand MLA Rajkumar Yadav and former MLA Vinod Singh. Jan Sanskriti Manch Jharkhand's team as well as poet Krishna Kant Nirmohi presented revolutionary songs on the occasion. The fourth issue of the Kisan Mahasabha's organ Viplavi Kisan Sandesh was also released on the occasion.

Addressing the Conference Comrade Dipankar said that Modi came to power making tall promises to peasants – and in his rule peasants are instead being shot dead for asking him to make good on those promises. Meanwhile, lynch mobs are killing Muslim dairy farmers and cattle traders and bans on cattle slaughter are wreaking havoc with the rural economy. The Modi Government as well as BJP-led state governments are conducting an all-out war on adivasis' and peasants' rights to land. But movements of peasants and adivasis are holding out hope for the whole country.

AIKM General Secretary Comrade Rajaram Singh spoke of the intense agrarian crisis and farmers' distress due to the government's policy of handing over seeds, fertilisers and other vital aspects of agriculture to corporate interests. As a result, farmers were being caught in a vicious debt trap even when they produced bumper harvests, while recurrent droughts and other calamities intensified the crisis. Protesting farmers were being shot dead. The Modi government had been forced to withdraw the land grab bill but similar laws were being enacted by various BJP State Governments. Meanwhile, BJP Ministers and leaders made insulting remarks about the thousands of farmers forced to commit suicide every year. The Government that was handing out unlimited bailouts and waivers to greedy corporations that defaulted on bank loans, was refusing to bail out desperate farmers who feed the country. He hailed the ongoing farmers' movements and called to intensify such movements to force a change in the policies and priorities of the Governments.

A nine-member presidium conducted the Conference. Among delegates who discussed the draft report and suggested ways forward for the peasants' movement were Gurnam Singh Bhikhi and Balkaran Balli of Punjab, Afroz Alam and Shashikant Singh of UP, Ramchandra Kulhari of Rajasthan, Kripa Narayan Singh, Jitendra Yadav, and Chandrama Prasad of Bihar, Shyamdev Yadav of Jharkhand, OP Arya of Haryana, Nilanjan Bhattacharya of Odisha, D Pullarao of Andhra Pradesh, Simpson of Tamil Nadu, Krishnapada Pramanik and Gopal Roy of West Bengal and Rajendra Shah of Uttarakhand.

On the dais were CPI(ML) CCMs Kartik Pal, Balasundaram, Janardan Prasad, Manoj Bhakt, and KD Yadav; and social activist Shiv Kumar Shibu. AIKM leaders Jaiprakash Narayan Rai, Bisheshwar Prasad Yadav, Prem Singh Gehlawat, Purushottam Sharma, Gurnam Singh, Ramchandra Kulhari, and Ashok Pradhan also were prominent among participants in the Conference. The Conference elected a 101-member National Council and a 45-member National Executive, and re-elected Ruldu Singh as president, and Raja Ram Singh as General Secretary along with 8 Vice Presidents and Secretaries each.

The Conference called for an all India protest against the killings of 6 peasants at Mandsaur by Madhya Pradesh's BJP government. It demanded the resignation of the killer Shivraj Singh Government; all India waiver of all government and private moneylenders' loans of farmers; guarantee of profitable minimum support price for all crops; guaranteed purchase of all produce of peasants and tenant farmers; and withdrawal of all cases against agitating peasants.

== Organisation ==
- National President: Ruldu Singh Mansa
- National Vice-president: Prem Singh Gehlawat
- National General Secretary: Rajaram Singh

== Protest against three Agri-bills ==
AIKSCC led nationwide protests against Farmers' Produce Trade and Commerce (Promotion and Facilitation) Act, 2020, Farmers (Empowerment and Protection) Agreement on Price Assurance and Farm Services Act, 2020 and Essential Commodities (Amendment) Act, 2020.

- 26 January 2021: AIKSCC organized tractor rally in national capital. AIKM joined the rally with a large number of tractor.
