= Manoj Manzil =

Indian politician (born c. 1984)

Member of the Bihar Legislative Assembly
- In office 16 November 2020 – 18 February 2024
- Preceded by: Prabhunath Prasad
- Succeeded by: Shiv Prakash Ranjan
- Constituency: Agiaon

National President of RYA
- Incumbent
- Assumed office 2018

Personal details
- Born: Manoj Kumar c. 1984 (age 41–42) Tarari, Bihar, India
- Party: Communist Party of India (Marxist–Leninist) (Liberation)

Manoj Manzil is an Indian politician from Bihar. He represented the CPIML Liberation in Tejashwi Yadav's Mahagathbandhan alliance during the 2020 Bihar Legislative Assembly Election. Manzil has concentrated his political activity in Agiaon and has been organizing the Sadak Par School Movement in Bhojpur. He received 84,777 votes, 61.51% of total vote share, and was elected as the MLA from Agiaon in 2020.

== History ==
Manzil was born in 1984 or 1985 to a family of landless Dalit labourers and brick kiln workers. His father was a cadre of the CPI(ML) and his uncle spent his life as part of the Jay Prakash movement.

He managed to get into college in Arrah and taught students to make ends meet but was forced to drop out several times. He eventually became a Left activist. In 2015, he contested the elections from Agiaon as a CPI(ML)-L candidate but was jailed and came in third place.

In 2018, he organized the Sadak Par School movement in Bhojpur district, where he and other cadres would teach students on the road to protest abysmal primary schooling in rural Bihar. The movement gained significant media attention and in response the government made several school reforms. In 2020, he contested the elections again and won a majority.

== Conviction ==
Manoj Manzil along with 22 others were sentenced to life imprisonment in a case relating to the murder of JP Singh during the 2015 Bihar Legislative Assembly election.
