= Brij Bihari Pandey =

Indian politician

Personal details
- Citizenship: India
- Party: Communist Party of India (Marxist-Leninist) Liberation

Brij Bihari Pandey is an Indian politician known for being most close associate of Vinod Mishra who founded Communist Party of India (Marxist–Leninist) Liberation. He is a Central Committee member of the Communist Party of India (Marxist-Leninist) Liberation. He was a childhood friend of the founder and leader of the party, Vinod Mishra. He edited the publication Lokyuddh along with Narendra Sah. He is currently the Chairperson of the Central Control Commission of the Party.
