= Raja Ram Singh Kushwaha =

Indian politician

Member of Parliament, Lok Sabha
- Incumbent
- Assumed office 2024
- Preceded by: Mahabali Singh Kushwaha
- Constituency: Karakat

Member of the Bihar Legislative Assembly
- In office 1995–2005
- Constituency: Obra

President of All India Kisan Sangharsh Coordination Committee for Bihar and Jharkhand
- Incumbent
- Assumed office 2023

Personal details
- Born: March 27, 1958 (age 68)
- Party: Communist Party of India (Marxist–Leninist) Liberation
- Parent: Deepan Singh
- Education: National Institute of Technology, Patna (B.Sc. Civil Engineering in 1983)

Raja Ram Singh Kushwaha (born 27 March 1958) is an Indian politician and farmers' leader from Bihar, who has served as a Member of Parliament, Lok Sabha, representing Karakat constituency since 2024.

He is a member of the Communist Party of India (Marxist–Leninist) Liberation (CPI(ML) Liberation) and serves as the party's Floor leader in the Lok Sabha.

A member of the party's Politburo, he previously represented the Obra Assembly constituency in the Bihar Legislative Assembly for two consecutive terms, winning elections in 1995 and 2000.

Born into a farming family in Ekauni village of Bihar's Aurangabad district, Singh studied civil engineering at Bihar College of Engineering (now the National Institute of Technology, Patna). He entered politics through the Indian People's Front during the 1980s and subsequently became involved in farmers' movements.

== Life ==
Raja Ram Singh was born to Deepan Singh in Ekauni Village of the Aurangabad district of Bihar in a Koeri family. The son of a marginal farmer, Singh was a social worker before joining politics and his spouse is a principle of Primary School Railways. He has completed his degree of civil engineering from Bihar College of Engineering, which later came to be known as National Institute of Technology, Patna. However, he never pursued a career in engineering and joined Indian People's Front. By the 1980s, he was a significant leader of the IPF.

Later, he remained associated with the CPI-ML party and contested the state legislative assembly elections in 1995 on its symbol. He managed to win that election and repeated his electoral victory in the 2000 Bihar Legislative Assembly elections. He again contested from this constituency in the 2015 Bihar Legislative Assembly elections. In this election, he finished in third position with 22,801 votes. Birendra Kumar Sinha of Rashtriya Janata Dal, who won this election from the Obra constituency and Chandra Bhushan Verma of Rashtriya Lok Samata Party were the winners and first runner-up. He also contested elections to the Lok Sabha in 2009, 2014 and 2019, but in all these elections, his performance remained poor.

In 2012, he was also imprisoned in connection with a demonstration organised by him and his party members against the murder of Mukhiya of Sonhathu Panchayat of Haspura block, Devendra Kumar. They were arrested while organising demonstration to demand Central Bureau of Investigation enquiry into the case.

Singh is also one of the prominent leaders of the farmers' movement in India. He is the state chief of All India Kisan Sangharsh Coordination Committee for the states of Bihar and Jharkhand, besides being a member of politburo of Communist Party of India (Marxist-Leninist) liberation. He is also the national secretary of All India Kisan Mahasabha, a peasant right organisation.

In 2020-21, he led a procession from Bihar to the Delhi-Punjab border in support of peasant agitators, who were opposing the three farm laws that were passed by the Narendra Modi government. These bills, which were later scrapped, were branded as against farmers by the agitators. He has also consistently demanded the restoration of Agricultural Produce Market Committees, which were disbanded by the Bihar government.

Singh was made a candidate for the 2024 Indian general elections from Karakat Lok Sabha constituency against Rashtriya Lok Morcha president Upendra Kushwaha, who contested as an ally of Bhartiya Janata Party. In this election, he faced a triangular contest with the entry of Bhojpuri singer and actor Pawan Singh, who denied BJP's symbol from Asansol to contest from Karakat constituency. It was speculated in political discourse that Pawan Singh will be able to collect a major chunk of Rajput votes in the electoral contest between two Koeri leaders.

After the final counting of votes Raja Ram Singh clinched an easy victory by defeating Pawan Singh with a fair margin of over one lakh votes. For his election campaigns and election expenses, Raja Ram, like his party colleague Sudama Prasad relied on donation from the public. They got twenty lakh coupons of ₹ 20 each printed by their party and travelled door to door to meet the voters requesting them to donate. With these minimal resources and lack of helicopters to expedite their election campaign, their workers travelled on bicycles and two-wheelers to connect with the ordinary people. The result was surprisingly positive for both Raja Ram and Prasad, who were able to defeat National Democratic Alliance heavyweights R. K. Singh and Upendra Kushwaha, besides Bhojpuri actor Pawan Singh.

== Election results ==
2024 Indian general elections: Karakat
Party	Candidate	Votes	%	±%
CPI(ML)L	Raja Ram Singh Kushwaha	3,80,581	36.89	
Independent	Pawan Singh	2,74,723	26.63	
RLM	Upendra Kushwaha	2,53,876	24.61	
NOTA	None of the above	21,595		
Majority		1,05,858		
Turnout		10,31,618		
CPI(ML)L gain from JD(U)		Swing		

== See also ==
- Vijay Lakshmi Kushwaha
- Neeraj Kushwaha Maurya
- Devesh Shakya
- Babu Singh Kushwaha
- Bharat Singh Kushwah
- Sunil Kumar Kushwaha
- Abhay Kushwaha
