= Narayanpur, Bhojpur =

Narayanpur
- Village
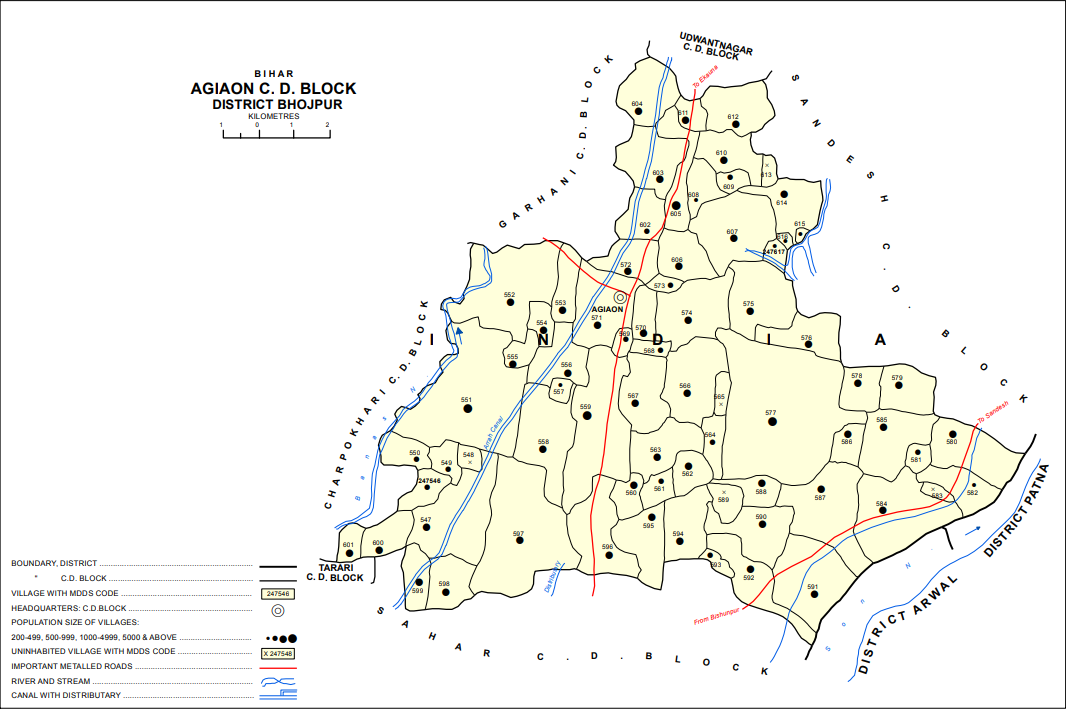
- Map of Narayanpur in Agiaon block

- Location in Bihar, India Narayanpur (India)
- Coordinates: 25.37651°N 84.60789°E
- Country: India
- State: Bihar
- District: Bhojpur
- Block/Tehsil: Agiaon

Area
  - Total: 5.86 km^{2} (2.26 sq mi)
- Elevation: 75 m (246 ft)

Population (2011)
  - Total: 6,476
  - Density: 1,110/km^{2} (2,860/sq mi)

Language
  - Official: Hindi
  - Regional: Bhojpuri
- Time zone: UTC+5:30 (IST)
- PIN Code: 802201
- Vehicle registration: BR-03
- Website: https://bhojpur.nic.in/

Narayanpur is a village in Agiaon block, Bhojpur district of Bihar, India. As of 2011, its population was 6,476 in 961 households.

== See also ==
- Arrah Lok Sabha constituency
- Agiaon Assembly constituency
