= 1990 Bihar Legislative Assembly election =

Election in India

- 27 February 1990

324 seats to the Bihar Legislative Assembly seats 163 seats needed for a majority
- Turnout: 62.04%
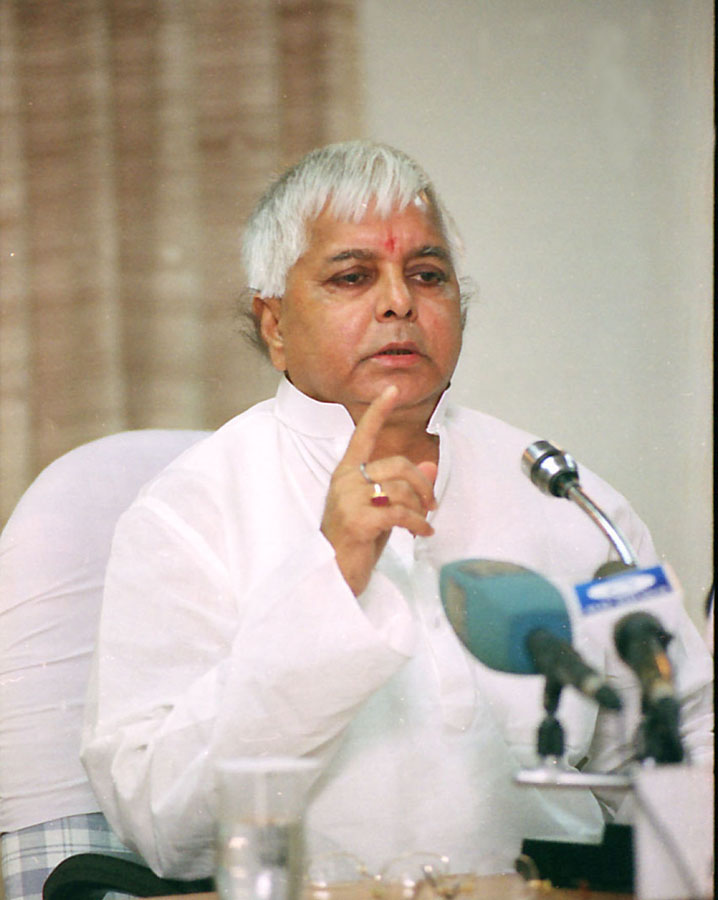

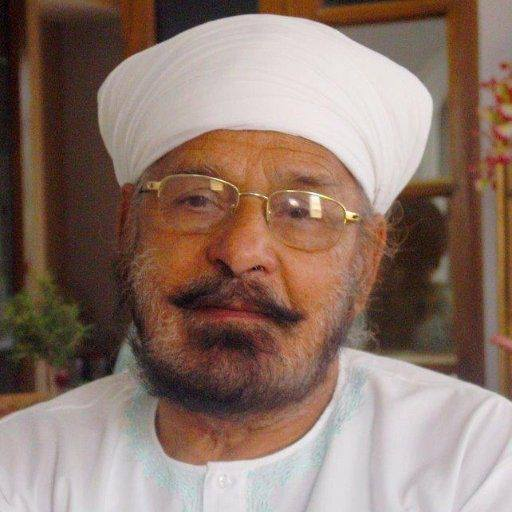
	Majority party	Minority party	Third party
Leader	Lalu Prasad Yadav	Jagannath Mishra	Inder Singh Namdhari
Party	JD	INC	BJP
Leader since	1990	1989	1988
Leader's seat	MLC	Jhanjharpur	Daltonganj
Last election	New	196 seats, 39.30%	16 seats, 7.54%
Seats won	122	71	39
Seat change	New	▼125	▲23
Popular vote	8,212,666	7,946,635	3,721,392
Percentage	25.61%	24.78%	11.61%
Swing	New	▼14.52%	▲4.07%
CM before election
Jagannath Mishra
INC
Elected CM
Lalu Prasad Yadav
JD

The 10th Bihar Legislative Assembly elections were held in February 1990, to elect representatives for the Bihar Legislative Assembly. It resulted in a decisive victory for the Janta Dal, riding on the pan-India victory of 1989, during V. P. Singh's wave. Political manoeuvres ensured parliamentarian Lalu Prasad Yadav's victory in the chief minister-ship battle, against seasoned Bihar leader Ram Sundar Das, who was close to Janta party stalwarts like S.N. Sinha and Chandrashekhar.

== Results ==
=== Party-wise ===
Party	Seats			Vote	
Party	Contested	Won	+/-	%	+/-
Janata Dal (JD)	276	122	new	25.61%	new
Indian National Congress (INC)	323	71	▼125	24.78%	▼14.52%
Bharatiya Janata Party (BJP)	237	39	▲23	11.61%	▲4.07%
Communist Party of India (CPI)	109	23	▲11	6.59%	▼2.27%
Jharkhand Mukti Morcha (JMM)	82	19	▲10	3.14%	▲1.32%
Indian People's Front (IPF)	82	7	new	2.77%	new
Communist Party of India (Marxist) (CPM)	31	6	▲5	1.33%	▼0.28%
Janata Party (JP)	158	3	▼10	1.54%	▼5.67%
Marxist Co-ordination Committee (MCC)	11	2	new	0.22%	new
Jharkhand Party (JHP)	28	1	new	0.42%	new
Socialist Party (SOP)	47	1	new	0.34%	new
Independents	4320	30	▲1	18.42%	▼0.54%
Total		324			

The Janata dal gained majority in the house by the outside support of CPI, CPI(M), JMM and a few independents. This was followed by an internal election within the Janata dal for chief minister post. The fight was between Ram sundar Das (supported by PM VP Singh) and Lalu Yadav (supported by Deputy PM Devi Lal). Sensing a strong opponent, Lalu requested Chandra Shekhar to ask Ragunath Jha to contest, which tilted the election in his favour. Nitish Kumar and Sharad Yadav rallied backward caste MLAs towards Yadav. In the election, Yadav won narrowly over Das by a vote of 59 to 56. Jha won 12, mostly upper caste MLAs.

=== Constituency-wise ===
Constituency		Winner				Runner Up				Margin	%
No.	Name (Note: SC and ST indicate constituencies reserved for Scheduled Castes and Scheduled Tribes respectively.)	Candidate	Party	Votes	%	Candidate	Party	Votes	%	Margin	%
1	Dhanaha	Shyam N. Prasad	INC	18,893	27.00	Satan Yadav	LKD(B)	13,469	19.25	5,424	7.75
2	Bagha (SC)	Puranmasi Ram	JD	56,207	69.11	Kailash Baitha	BJP	11,694	14.38	44,513	54.73
3	Ramnagar	Chander Mohan Rai	BJP	45,281	56.78	Seikh Sarfuddin	JD	14,319	17.96	30,962	38.82
4	Shikarpur (SC)	Bhola Ram Toofani	JD	41,817	58.32	Narsingh Baitha	INC	25,461	35.51	16,356	22.81
5	Sikta	Faiyajul Azam	IND	23,883	28.75	Dillip Kumar	JD	16,936	20.39	6,947	8.36
6	Lauria	Ran Vijay Shahi	JD	40,199	52.89	Vishwa Mohan Sharma	INC	30,945	40.71	9,254	12.18
7	Chanpatia	Krishna Kumar Mishra	JD	20,921	30.04	Virbal Sharma	CPI	17,858	25.65	3,063	4.39
8	Bettiah	Madan Prasad Jaiswal	BJP	42,968	40.85	Nageshwar Na. Shahi	IND	36,229	34.44	6,739	6.41
9	Nautan	Rawakant Diwedi	CPI	25,009	36.78	Birbal Prasad	JD	15,843	23.30	9,166	13.48
10	Raxaul	Rajnandan Rai	JD	43,211	46.14	Sagir Ahmad	INC	29,939	31.97	13,272	14.17
11	Sugauli	Ramashray Singh	CPI(M)	20,900	21.91	Ashok Kumar Mishar	INC	18,489	19.39	2,411	2.52
12	Motihari	Triveni Tiwari	CPI	26,280	28.90	Laxman Parsad	BJP	25,195	27.70	1,085	1.20
13	Adapur	Braj Bihari Prasad	JD	53,282	50.40	Mukti Narayan Ray	CPI(ML)	24,054	22.75	29,228	27.65
14	Dhaka	Avanish Kumar Singh	BJP	92,676	64.30	Motiur Rahman	INC	48,078	33.36	44,598	30.94
15	Ghorasahan	Lal Babu Prasad	JD	59,646	61.00	Anil Kumar Singh	BJP	18,093	18.50	41,553	42.50
16	Madhuban	Sita Ram Singh	JD	66,093	57.34	Ramji Singh	BJP	24,130	20.93	41,963	36.41
17	Pipra (SC)	Sahdev Paswan	JD	34,800	44.23	Nand Lal Chaudhary	INC	19,593	24.90	15,207	19.33
18	Kesariya	Yamuna Yadav	CPI	40,216	42.21	Rai Hari Shanker Sharma	BJP	20,450	21.47	19,766	20.74
19	Harsidhi	Mohd. Hedayatullah Khan	INC	27,831	33.86	Vishambhar Nath	BJP	26,028	31.66	1,803	2.20
20	Gobindganj	Yogendra Pandey	JD	40,473	40.20	Jai Prakash Pandey	INC	31,959	31.75	8,514	8.45
21	Kateya	Bachcha Chube	INC	54,422	44.59	Nagina Rai	JD	47,017	38.52	7,405	6.07
22	Bhore (SC)	Inder Dev Majhi	JD	58,289	50.94	Anil Kumar	IND	47,749	41.73	10,540	9.21
23	Mirganj	Prabhu Dayal Singh	IND	22,332	21.23	Vishavnath Singh	CPI(M)	21,101	20.06	1,231	1.17
24	Gopalganj	Surendra Singh	JD	72,908	73.41	Ambika Prasad Yadawa	IND	17,952	18.08	54,956	55.33
25	Barauli	Dhruv Nath Chaudhary	IND	23,652	23.81	Ram Parvesh Rai	JP	22,841	22.99	811	0.82
26	Baikunthpur	Braj Kishor Narayan Singh	INC	65,930	53.89	Devdat Prasad	JD	35,742	29.22	30,188	24.67
27	Basantpur	Manik Chander Rai	INC	43,481	41.42	Satya Dev Prasad Singh	BJP	34,133	32.51	9,348	8.91
28	Goreakothi	Ajit Kumar Singh	JD	26,423	27.51	Krishan Kant Singh	INC	22,981	23.92	3,442	3.59
29	Siwan	Avadh Bihari Chaudhary	JD	47,518	46.10	Serajul Haq	INC	29,663	28.78	17,855	17.32
30	Mairwa (SC)	Gorakh Ram	INC	23,834	35.36	Girdhari Ram	CPI(M)	11,758	17.45	12,076	17.91
31	Darauli	Shiv Shankar Yadav	JD	33,072	34.75	Rajdev Singh	BJP	25,342	26.63	7,730	8.12
32	Ziradei	S.M. Mashabuddin	IND	23,215	24.93	Tribhuvan Singh	INC	22,837	24.52	378	0.41
33	Maharajganj	Uma Shanker Singh	JD	69,730	62.94	Anusuiya Devi	INC	37,005	33.40	32,725	29.54
34	Raghunathpur	Vijay Shanker Dube	INC	38,242	37.73	Vigram Kuwar	JP	34,961	34.49	3,281	3.24
35	Manjhi	Hazari Singh	JD	50,365	48.04	Budhan Prasad Yadav	INC	34,117	32.54	16,248	15.50
36	Baniapur	Ram Bahadur Rai	JP	24,191	30.96	Uma Pandey	INC	23,593	30.19	598	0.77
37	Masrakh	Prabhu Nath Singh	JD	71,536	73.57	Harendra Singh	INC	12,498	12.85	59,038	60.72
38	Taraiya	Rajeo Pratap Singh	JD	38,694	38.30	Ram Das Roy	BJP	29,941	29.64	8,753	8.66
39	Marhaura	Surendra Sharma	IND	33,711	29.90	Yadubanshi Roy	JD	26,720	23.70	6,991	6.20
40	Jalalpur	Nirmala Singh	INC	23,428	27.96	Abhay Raj Kishor Rai	CPI	22,669	27.06	759	0.90
41	Chapra	Udit Roy	IND	65,355	49.08	Janak Yadau	JD	46,292	34.76	19,063	14.32
42	Garkha (SC)	Muneshwar Chaudhry	IND	36,684	39.75	Amrit Chaudhry	JD	29,394	31.85	7,290	7.90
43	Parsa	Chandrika Roy	IND	51,602	44.95	Ram Nath Vidyarthi	CPI	24,767	21.57	26,835	23.38
44	Sonepur	Raj Kumar Roy	JD	46,208	39.49	Birendra Narain Singh	INC	42,564	36.37	3,644	3.12
45	Hajipur	Jagannath Pd. Rai	INC	30,818	28.31	Jagannath Pd. Yadav	IND	17,578	16.15	13,240	12.16
46	Raghopur	Udai Narayan Rai	JD	50,632	37.91	Harihar Prasad Singh	IND	48,282	36.15	2,350	1.76
47	Mahnar	Muneshwar Pd. Singh	SP(L)	32,370	27.30	Raghupati	JD	30,641	25.84	1,729	1.46
48	Jandaha	Tulsidas Mehta	JD	46,478	35.30	Shivanarayan Pd. Mishra	IND	30,158	22.90	16,320	12.40
49	Patepur (SC)	Ramsundar Das	JD	78,899	75.40	Baleshwar Singh Paswan	INC	21,581	20.63	57,318	54.77
50	Mahua (SC)	Munsilal Paswan	JD	62,459	60.47	Kapileshwarram Keshri	INC	29,800	28.85	32,659	31.62
51	Lalganj	Kedar Nath Prasad	JD	40,353	36.23	Bharat Prasad Singh	INC	36,543	32.81	3,810	3.42
52	Vaishali	Brishan Patel	JD	59,392	49.17	Hemant Kumar Shahi	INC	56,098	46.44	3,294	2.73
53	Paru	Virendra Kumar Singh	IND	48,200	37.18	Nitishwar Pd. Singh	IND	34,181	26.36	14,019	10.82
54	Sahebganj	Ram Bichar Rai	JD	52,599	44.25	Mahachandra Pd. Singh	INC	44,551	37.48	8,048	6.77
55	Baruraj	Shashi Ku. Rai	JD	57,747	45.56	Ballendra Pd. Singh	IND	49,463	39.03	8,284	6.53
56	Kanti	Nalini Ranjan Singh	JD	20,149	25.01	Shambhu Sharan Thakur	INC	14,466	17.96	5,683	7.05
57	Kurhani	Sadhu Sharan Shahi	IND	44,301	37.29	Shiv Nandan Rai	INC	30,109	25.35	14,192	11.94
58	Sakra (SC)	Kamal Paswan	JD	44,863	48.29	Bilar Paswan	INC	29,258	31.49	15,605	16.80
59	Muzaffarpur	Raghunath Pandey	INC	82,918	64.02	Arun Ku. Sinha	JD	29,602	22.86	53,316	41.16
60	Bochaha (SC)	Ramai Ram	JD	66,280	64.97	Ram Pratap Niraj	INC	27,854	27.30	38,426	37.67
61	Gaighatti	Maheshwar Pr. Yadav	IND	55,409	46.47	Virendra Prasad Singh	INC	29,734	24.93	25,675	21.54
62	Aurai	Ganesh Prasad Yadav	JD	65,604	55.15	Ram Babu Thakur	IND	37,756	31.74	27,848	23.41
63	Minapur	Hind Keshri Yadav	JD	46,600	41.30	Janakdhari Pr. Kushwaha	CPI	33,045	29.28	13,555	12.02
64	Runisaidpur	Nawal Kishor Sahi	JD	38,679	32.00	Girja Nandan Prasad	BJP	38,317	31.70	362	0.30
65	Belsand	Digvijay Pratap Singh	INC	35,868	40.22	Raghubans Pd. Singh	JD	33,463	37.52	2,405	2.70
66	Sheohar	Raghunath Jha	JD	74,616	62.14	Thakur Diwakar	INC	43,424	36.16	31,192	25.98
67	Sitamarhi	Shahid Ali Khan	JD	23,059	19.49	Hari Shankar Prasad	IND	16,973	14.34	6,086	5.15
68	Bathnaha	Suryadeo Rai	JD	57,227	47.73	Rajendra Singh	IND	14,795	12.34	42,432	35.39
69	Majorganj (SC)	Gauri Shankar Nagdansh	JD	33,574	39.14	Sanup Raut	BJP	24,758	28.86	8,816	10.28
70	Sonbarsa	Ram Jiwan Prasad	JD	52,780	45.63	Md. Anwarul Haque	INC	43,818	37.88	8,962	7.75
71	Sursand	Ravindra Prasad Sahi	INC	42,035	38.36	Nagendra Yadav	IND	39,833	36.35	2,202	2.01
72	Pupri	Sita Ram Yadav	JD	43,400	38.24	Ram Brikash Chaudhary	INC	33,640	29.64	9,760	8.60
73	Benipatti	Yugeshwar Jha	INC	55,147	51.88	Shaligram Yadav	JD	40,635	38.23	14,512	13.65
74	Bisfi	Shakil Ahmad	INC	70,058	55.77	Ram Chadra Yadav	CPI	42,946	34.18	27,112	21.59
75	Harlakhi	Vin Vadani Devi	INC	40,412	42.89	Ram Naresh Pandey	CPI	34,392	36.50	6,020	6.39
76	Khajauli (SC)	Vilat Paswan 'Vihangam'	INC	27,857	29.47	Ram Lakhan Ram	CPI	26,775	28.33	1,082	1.14
77	Babubarhi	Deo Narayan Yadav	JD	44,834	45.78	Mahendra Narayan Jha	INC	25,821	26.37	19,013	19.41
78	Madhubani	Raj Kumar Mahaseth	IND	31,435	32.38	Prem Chandra Missir	INC	21,546	22.19	9,889	10.19
79	Pandaul	Kumud Ranjan Jha	INC	54,321	49.24	Naiyar Azam	JD	50,902	46.14	3,419	3.10
80	Jhanjharpur	Jagannath Mishra	INC	77,630	68.14	Arun Ku. Lal Das	JD	32,924	28.90	44,706	39.24
81	Phulparas	Ram Kumar Yadav	JD	32,325	29.95	Dev Nath Yadav	INC	27,168	25.17	5,157	4.78
82	Laukaha	Lal Bihari Yadav	CPI	20,784	20.52	Krishan Dev Goit	IND	17,324	17.11	3,460	3.41
83	Madhepur	Roop Narayan Jha	JD	55,924	56.38	Harkhu Jha	INC	33,784	34.06	22,140	22.32
84	Manigachhi	Madan Mohan Chaudhary	INC	65,390	58.49	Ashok Kumar	JD	38,897	34.79	26,493	23.70
85	Bahera	Mahendra Jha Azad	INC	58,077	46.13	Abdul Bari Siddiqui	JD	43,070	34.21	15,007	11.92
86	Ghanshyampur	Mahavir Prasad	JD	78,082	53.26	Chandra Kishore Jha	INC	65,368	44.59	12,714	8.67
87	Baheri	Mohan Choudhary	INC	46,020	34.70	Ram Lakhan Yadav	IND	37,465	28.25	8,555	6.45
88	Darbhanga Rural (SC)	Jagdish Chaudhary	JD	47,941	50.77	Ram Chander Paswan	INC	28,742	30.44	19,199	20.33
89	Darbhanga	Kameshwar Purve	JD	40,774	41.69	Vijay Kant Thakur	CPI(M)	16,331	16.70	24,443	24.99
90	Keoti	Gulam Sarvar	JD	40,110	34.53	Raj Kishor Yadav	IND	20,617	17.75	19,493	16.78
91	Jale	Vijay Kumar Mishra	INC	36,931	36.40	Abdul Salam	CPI	31,452	31.00	5,479	5.40
92	Hayaghat	Kafil Ahmad	JD	27,434	28.87	Umadhar Prasad Singh	CPI(ML)	27,052	28.47	382	0.40
93	Kalyanpur	Dilip Kumar Rai	INC	34,977	32.56	Bashisht Narain Singh	JD	32,964	30.69	2,013	1.87
94	Warisnagar (SC)	Pitamber Paswan	JD	47,834	53.12	Parmeshar Ram	INC	41,074	45.61	6,760	7.51
95	Samastipur	Ashok Singh	JD	46,002	42.99	Visheshwar Rai	INC	23,504	21.97	22,498	21.02
96	Sarairanjan	Ram Bilash Mishra	JD	40,541	34.16	Nandu Jha	INC	36,799	31.01	3,742	3.15
97	Mohiuddin Nagar	Ram Chandra Rai	JD	78,169	55.36	Chandrakant Choudhary	BJP	25,455	18.03	52,714	37.33
98	Dalsinghsarai	Vijay Kumar Chaudhary	INC	47,902	42.77	Harbans Narain Singh	JD	27,869	24.88	20,033	17.89
99	Bibhutpur	Ramdeo Verma	CPI(M)	60,715	46.89	Chandrabali Thakur	IND	55,643	42.97	5,072	3.92
100	Rosera (SC)	Gajendrapd. Singh	JD	56,232	49.59	Rama Kant Jha	INC	48,755	43.00	7,477	6.59
101	Singhia (SC)	Ashok Kumar	INC	54,948	52.14	Jadish Paswan	JD	29,669	28.15	25,279	23.99
102	Hasanpur	Gahendra Prasad Himanshu	JD	57,673	61.01	Rajendra Pd. Yadav	INC	29,663	31.38	28,010	29.63
103	Balia	Sri Narayan Yadav	JD	42,274	42.63	Samsu Joha	INC	15,260	15.39	27,014	27.24
104	Matihani	Rajendra Rajan	CPI	38,861	42.93	Pramod Kumar Sharma	INC	30,341	33.52	8,520	9.41
105	Begusarai	Basudev Singh	CPI(M)	38,754	40.91	Bhola Singh	INC	35,823	37.82	2,931	3.09
106	Barauni	Shivdani Singh	CPI	46,247	47.08	Kamla Devi	INC	34,091	34.70	12,156	12.38
107	Bachhwara	Awadhesh Rai	CPI	41,555	45.36	Ram Deo Rai	INC	28,828	31.47	12,727	13.89
108	Cheria Bariarpur	Ram Jiwan Singh	JD	55,601	58.48	Sukhdevo Mahton	IND	16,115	16.95	39,486	41.53
109	Bakhri (SC)	Ram Vinod Paswan	CPI	39,491	50.59	Deo Narain Chaudhry	INC	23,572	30.19	15,919	20.40
110	Raghopur	Amrendra Mishra	INC	52,779	43.06	Udai Prakash Goit	JD	49,725	40.57	3,054	2.49
111	Kishunpur	Vinayak Pd. Yadav	JD	40,062	33.16	Yaduvans Kumar Yadav	INC	23,048	19.08	17,014	14.08
112	Supaul	Vijendra Pd. Yadav	JD	48,140	35.72	Parmod Kumar Singh	INC	43,884	32.56	4,256	3.16
113	Tribeniganj	Anoop Lal Yadav	JD	67,159	62.46	Ram Chandra Pd. Mandal	INC	37,954	35.30	29,205	27.16
114	Chhatapur (SC)	Yogendra Nr. Sardar	JD	57,721	59.63	Kumbh Nr. Sardar	INC	33,698	34.81	24,023	24.82
115	Kumarkhand (SC)	Nawal Kishor Bharti	JD	58,254	59.24	Domi Ram	INC	23,878	24.28	34,376	34.96
116	Singheshwar	Rajesh Ranjan	IND	57,759	46.36	Siya Ram Pd. Yadav	JD	36,381	29.20	21,378	17.16
117	Saharsa	Shankar Prasad Tekriwal	JD	76,049	58.82	Satish Chander Jha	INC	45,104	34.88	30,945	23.94
118	Mahishi	Anand Mohan	JD	97,032	70.52	Lahtan Chaudhary	INC	35,007	25.44	62,025	45.08
119	Simri-Bakhtiarpur	Dinesh Chander Yadav	JD	94,402	64.49	Mahboob Ali Kaisar	INC	47,334	32.33	47,068	32.16
120	Madhepura	Radha Kant Yadav	JD	68,905	51.40	Manindra Kumar Mandal	INC	25,584	19.08	43,321	32.32
121	Sonbarsa	Ashok Kumar Singh	JD	52,718	40.82	K. K. Mandal	INC	41,330	32.01	11,388	8.81
122	Kishanganj	Ravinder Charan Yadav	JD	30,325	30.70	Maheshwar Mehta	INC	24,197	24.49	6,128	6.21
123	Alamnagar	Birendra "Kumar Singh"	JD	30,948	31.47	Rajendra Singh	CPI	29,735	30.24	1,213	1.23
124	Rupauli	Saryug Mandal	IND	20,789	23.26	Jai Krishna Singh	BJP	20,162	22.56	627	0.70
125	Dhamdaha	Amarnath Tiwari	INC	48,966	44.80	Surya Narayan Singh	JD	36,539	33.43	12,427	11.37
126	Banmankhi (SC)	Chunni Lal Raj Banshi	BJP	32,414	34.53	Jai Kant Paswan	INC	24,048	25.62	8,366	8.91
127	Raniganj (SC)	Shanti Devi	JD	36,950	37.18	Yamuna Pd. Ram	INC	33,174	33.38	3,776	3.80
128	Narpatganj	Dayanand Yadav	JD	27,565	29.89	Indranand Yadav	INC	20,996	22.77	6,569	7.12
129	Forbesganj	Mayanand Thakur	BJP	15,777	16.55	Shital Pd. Gupta	INC	13,836	14.51	1,941	2.04
130	Araria	Vinod Ku. Roy	IND	15,859	17.19	Nand Kishore Mandal	IND	15,636	16.95	223	0.24
131	Sikti	Md. Azimuddin	JD	38,726	34.21	Rameshwar Yadav	INC	21,300	18.82	17,426	15.39
132	Jokihat	Moidur Rahman	INC	23,292	25.41	Bhup Narain Yadav	IND	22,398	24.44	894	0.97
133	Bahadurganj	Islamudin "Bagi"	JD	43,794	59.26	Najmuddin	INC	21,858	29.58	21,936	29.68
134	Thakurganj	Md. Suleman	JD	34,749	39.01	Md. Husen Azad	INC	19,445	21.83	15,304	17.18
135	Kishanganj	Md. Mustaque Munna	JD	42,068	43.94	Khalilur Raman	INC	23,382	24.42	18,686	19.52
136	Amour	A. Jalil	INC	44,683	43.06	Muzaffar Hussain	IC(S)	20,128	19.39	24,555	23.67
137	Baisi	A. Subhan	JD	22,186	26.82	Moinuddin	INC	16,328	19.73	5,858	7.09
138	Kasba	Shiv Charan Mehrta	JD	62,556	56.67	Md. Yasin	INC	15,687	14.21	46,869	42.46
139	Purnea	Ajit Sarkar	CPI(M)	38,144	39.93	Ravindra Narayan Singh	JD	12,121	12.69	26,023	27.24
140	Korha (SC)	Sita Ram Das	JD	46,241	54.74	Vishwanath Rishi	INC	15,984	18.92	30,257	35.82
141	Barari	Prem Nath Jaiswal	IND	32,796	37.38	Mansoor Alam	JD	25,839	29.45	6,957	7.93
142	Katihar	Ram Prakash Mahto	JD	78,275	69.80	Jagdish Prasad Mandal	BJP	15,312	13.65	62,963	56.15
143	Kadwa	Abdul Jalil	IND	23,145	27.14	Bhola Ray	BJP	20,480	24.01	2,665	3.13
144	Barsoi	Sddique	JD	35,463	41.05	Mohboob Alam	IND	15,495	17.94	19,968	23.11
145	Pranpur	Mahendra Nath Yadav	JD	41,043	58.11	Md. Sakoor	IND	18,618	26.36	22,425	31.75
146	Manihari	Bishwanath Singh	JD	30,974	38.78	Mubarak Hussain	INC	21,456	26.86	9,518	11.92
147	Rajmahal	Raghunath Prasad Sodani	INC	38,160	41.20	Dhruv Bhagat	BJP	34,171	36.89	3,989	4.31
148	Borio (ST)	Lobin Hembrom	JMM	20,065	29.63	Mahindra Hansda	BJP	12,102	17.87	7,963	11.76
149	Barhait (ST)	Hem Lal Murmu	JMM	38,946	47.57	Thoman Hansda	INC	37,552	45.87	1,394	1.70
150	Litipara (ST)	Shushila Hasda	JMM	27,736	48.58	Jhanoreati Tudu	BJP	10,636	18.63	17,100	29.95
151	Pakaur	Beni Prasad Gupta	BJP	26,211	30.83	Hazi Md. Aihul Haque	INC	20,235	23.80	5,976	7.03
152	Maheshpur (ST)	Kali Das Murmu	INC	16,606	26.74	Devi Dhan Besra	JMM	15,476	24.92	1,130	1.82
153	Sikaripara (ST)	Nalin Soren	JMM	27,799	44.12	Stephan Hansda	INC	8,494	13.48	19,305	30.64
154	Nala	Raj Kumari Himmatsinghka	INC	31,241	37.16	Bisheshwar Khan	CPI	26,078	31.02	5,163	6.14
155	Jamtara	Furkan Ansari	INC	32,336	37.53	Babu Lal Marandi	JMM	29,281	33.99	3,055	3.54
156	Sarath	Uday Shanker Singh	INC	44,887	46.40	Md. Abutahib	JMM	28,053	29.00	16,834	17.40
157	Madhupur	Krishanand Jha	INC	46,397	46.03	Yamun Pd. Tewari	BJP	29,420	29.18	16,977	16.85
158	Deoghar (SC)	Baidyanath Das	INC	25,633	32.97	Suresh Paswan	CPI	23,004	29.59	2,629	3.38
159	Jarmundi	Jawahar Pd. Singh	IND	24,392	30.39	Abhai Kant Prasad	BJP	13,672	17.03	10,720	13.36
160	Dumka (ST)	Stephen Marandi	JMM	31,608	48.00	Singhraj Hansda	BJP	18,939	28.76	12,669	19.24
161	Jama (ST)	Mohril Murmu	JMM	30,559	49.58	Mistry Hemram	INC	11,319	18.37	19,240	31.21
162	Poraiyahat	Suraj Mandal	JMM	39,944	39.36	Jagdambi Prasad Yadav	BJP	22,838	22.50	17,106	16.86
163	Godda	Sumrat Mandal	JMM	31,793	28.75	Rajnish Anand	JD	28,991	26.22	2,802	2.53
164	Mahagama	Faiaz Bhagalpuri	JD	32,703	29.24	Awadh Bihari Singh	INC	31,883	28.51	820	0.73
165	Pirpainti	Ambika Prasad	CPI	57,656	55.12	Dalip Ku. Sinha	INC	29,178	27.90	28,478	27.22
166	Colgong	Mahesh Prasad Mandal	JD	46,414	37.85	Sadanand Singh	INC	43,450	35.43	2,964	2.42
167	Nathnagar	Sudha Srivastava	JD	26,877	25.34	Kameshwar Yadav	HM	17,780	16.76	9,097	8.58
168	Bhagalpur	Bijay Kumar Mitra	BJP	41,000	42.81	Ishmail Khan	INC	18,863	19.69	22,137	23.12
169	Gopalpur	Gyaneshwar Yadav	BJP	29,137	26.93	Madan Pd. Singh	INC	27,344	25.27	1,793	1.66
170	Bihpur	Brahmadeo Mandal	JP	27,336	28.97	Bal Bhadra Chou.	BJP	24,269	25.72	3,067	3.25
171	Sultanganj (SC)	Fanindra Choudhary	JD	38,593	39.41	Ambika Prasad	INC	29,347	29.97	9,246	9.44
172	Amarpur	Madho Mandal	IND	36,466	36.04	Kamdeo Prasad Yadav	INC	29,339	28.99	7,127	7.05
173	Dhuraiya (SC)	Naresh Das	CPI	32,849	33.71	Shashi Kant Choudhary	BJP	27,942	28.67	4,907	5.04
174	Banka	Ram Narayan Mandal	BJP	19,696	22.31	Bedanand Singh	IND	15,945	18.06	3,751	4.25
175	Belhar	Chandra Mouleshwar	INC	24,784	30.26	Sushil Kumar Yadav	BJP	23,530	28.73	1,254	1.53
176	Katoria	Suresh Prasad Yadav	INC	17,239	19.41	Hari Prasad Yadav	JD	16,859	18.98	380	0.43
177	Chakai	Narendra Singh	JD	48,326	47.64	Falguni Prasad Yadav	BJP	31,195	30.75	17,131	16.89
178	Jhajha	Shiv Nandan Jha	JD	40,907	50.20	Ravindra Kumar Yadav	INC	30,486	37.41	10,421	12.79
179	Tarapur	Shakuni Choudhary	INC	47,303	41.77	Narayan Yadav	CPI	25,670	22.67	21,633	19.10
180	Kharagpur	Jai Prakash N. Yadav	JD	43,086	35.46	Rajendra Pd. Singh	INC	25,974	21.38	17,112	14.08
181	Parbatta	Vidyasagar Nishad	JD	30,725	28.80	Parmanand Chaudhary	IND	26,687	25.01	4,038	3.79
182	Chautham	Satya Narain Singh	CPI	33,123	32.08	Arun Keshari	JD	19,765	19.14	13,358	12.94
183	Khagaria	Ranveer Yadav	IND	35,504	36.63	Satyadeo Singh	INC	16,102	16.61	19,402	20.02
184	Alouli (SC)	Pasupati Kr. Paras	JD	45,542	54.08	Arun Kumar Paswan	INC	17,351	20.60	28,191	33.48
185	Munghyr	Ramdeo Singh Yadav	JD	65,545	47.75	Prabhat Kumar Mishra	INC	45,776	33.35	19,769	14.40
186	Jamalpur	Upendra Prasad Verma	JD	48,469	45.80	Akshay Lal Singh	IND	16,957	16.02	31,512	29.78
187	Surajgarha	Satish Kumar	CPI	37,853	32.42	Prasiddh Naraya Singh	BJP	29,505	25.27	8,348	7.15
188	Jamui	Sushil Kumar Singh	INC	41,412	35.68	Arjun Mandal	IND	17,295	14.90	24,117	20.78
189	Sikandra (SC)	Prayag Paswan	CPI	61,228	56.06	Rameshwar Paswan	INC	44,712	40.94	16,516	15.12
190	Lakhisarai	Krishna Chandra Pd. Singh	JD	67,756	50.67	Ashwani Kr. Sharma	IND	35,052	26.21	32,704	24.46
191	Sheikhpura	Rajo Singh	INC	1,23,750	88.59	Shiv Kumar	JD	14,327	10.26	1,09,423	78.33
192	Barbigha (SC)	Mahabir Choudhary	INC	66,438	68.43	Nagina Choudhary	JD	26,108	26.89	40,330	41.54
193	Asthawan	Raghu Ntah Prasad Sharma	IND	60,031	48.45	Vishnu Das Choudhary	JD	22,587	18.23	37,444	30.22
194	Bihar	Den Nath Prasad	BJP	47,345	28.77	Shakiluzzama	INC	45,901	27.89	1,444	0.88
195	Rajgir (SC)	Chander Dev Himanshu	CPI	50,116	44.47	Satya Dev Narayan Arya	BJP	41,205	36.56	8,911	7.91
196	Nalanda	Ram Naresh Singh	IND	69,721	50.94	Shrawan Kumar	JD	49,000	35.80	20,721	15.14
197	Islampur	Krishna Ballabh Prasad	CPI	68,040	45.87	Pankaj Kumar Sinha	INC	61,523	41.47	6,517	4.40
198	Hilsa	Kishnadeo Singh Yadav	IPF	29,902	24.63	Gopal Prasad	JD	24,125	19.87	5,777	4.76
199	Chandi	Hari Narayan Singh	JD	45,121	46.20	Anil Kumar	INC	23,272	23.83	21,849	22.37
200	Harnaut	Braj Nandan Yadav	IND	19,562	19.47	Bhola Prasad Singh	JD	14,283	14.21	5,279	5.26
201	Mokama	Dilip Kumar Singh	JD	52,455	43.59	Shyam Sunder Singh Dhiraj	INC	30,349	25.22	22,106	18.37
202	Barh	Vijay Krishan Singh	JD	48,165	35.79	Bhuneshwar Singh	IND	42,352	31.47	5,813	4.32
203	Bakhtiarpur	Ram Jaipal Singh Yadav	INC	30,119	23.62	Rajender Singh	JD	29,880	23.43	239	0.19
204	Fatwa (SC)	Punit Rai	JD	58,480	52.83	Sidhnath Mochi	IND	18,318	16.55	40,162	36.28
205	Masaurhi	Yougeshwar Gop	IPF	31,142	22.68	Poonam Devi	INC	30,176	21.97	966	0.71
206	Patna West	Ram Nandan Prasad	IND	35,083	28.71	Ram Karpal Yadav	JD	31,844	26.06	3,239	2.65
207	Patna Central	Sushil Kumar Modi	BJP	31,021	30.05	Akil Haider	INC	27,908	27.04	3,113	3.01
208	Patna East	Mahtab Lal Singh	JD	27,092	28.59	Vimlesh Singh	BJP	20,927	22.08	6,165	6.51
209	Danapur	Vijender Rai	JD	56,479	51.54	Abhay Kumar Singh	BJP	33,524	30.59	22,955	20.95
210	Maner	Srikant Nirala	INC	26,220	26.80	Suryadeo Tyagi	JD	21,089	21.55	5,131	5.25
211	Phulwari (SC)	Sanjeev Prasad Toni	INC	30,766	30.72	Vidyanand Vikal	IPF	16,037	16.01	14,729	14.71
212	Bikram	Ram Nath Yadav	CPI	27,050	24.94	Diwakar Sharma	INC	21,636	19.95	5,414	4.99
213	Paliganj	Ram Lakhan Singh Yadav	INC	55,744	50.71	Kripa Narain Singh	IPF	33,238	30.24	22,506	20.47
214	Sandesh	Sonadhair Singh	JD	32,861	31.46	Krishan Dev Yadav	IPF	26,879	25.73	5,982	5.73
215	Barhara	Radhvender Partap Singh	JD	43,365	38.27	Jaj Singh	IPF	24,430	21.56	18,935	16.71
216	Arrah	Vashisth Narain Singh	JD	38,085	37.29	Sudama Prasad	IPF	29,306	28.69	8,779	8.60
217	Shahpur	Dharam Pal Singh	JP	20,422	23.08	Shivanand Tiwari	IND	19,967	22.57	455	0.51
218	Brahmpur	Swami Nath Tewary	BJP	33,651	31.17	Rishikesh Tewary	INC	21,461	19.88	12,190	11.29
219	Buxar	Manju Prakash	CPI(M)	19,522	23.20	Jag Narain Trivedi	INC	18,464	21.94	1,058	1.26
220	Rajpur (SC)	Ram Narain Harijan	BJP	17,225	23.21	Arjoon Ram	CPI	15,254	20.56	1,971	2.65
221	Dumraon	Basant Singh	JD	32,590	35.15	Suraj Prasad	CPI	31,428	33.89	1,162	1.26
222	Jagdishpur	Sri Bhagwan Singh	IPF	24,873	26.10	Hari Narayan Singh	JD	22,223	23.32	2,650	2.78
223	Piro	Chander Deep Singh	IPF	23,964	23.93	Raghupati Gop	JD	20,150	20.12	3,814	3.81
224	Sahar (SC)	Jyoti	INC	49,642	47.85	Sidh Nath Ram	IPF	45,788	44.14	3,854	3.71
225	Karakat	Tulsi Singh	JD	35,859	37.44	Mani Singh	IPF	30,371	31.71	5,488	5.73
226	Bikramganj	Surya Deo Singh	IPF	22,433	22.34	Kashi Nath Chawdhary	BJP	20,011	19.93	2,422	2.41
227	Dinara	Ramdhani Singh	JD	33,068	33.15	Lakman Rai	INC	28,944	29.02	4,124	4.13
228	Ramgarh	Jagdanand Singh	JD	42,829	49.97	Parbhawati Singh	INC	22,681	26.46	20,148	23.51
229	Mohania (SC)	Shiwadhar Paswan	JD	36,636	48.56	Ishwar Deyal Ram	BSP	12,899	17.10	23,737	31.46
230	Bhabhua	Vijay Shankar Pandey	INC	19,734	20.80	Ram Lal Singh	CPI	19,367	20.41	367	0.39
231	Chainpur	Lal Muni Chaube	BJP	19,648	23.08	Mahabali Singh	BSP	15,994	18.79	3,654	4.29
232	Sasaram	Jawahir Prasad	BJP	42,956	39.91	Bipin Bihar Sinha	SP(L)	24,261	22.54	18,695	17.37
233	Chenari (SC)	Jawahar Paswan	JD	33,097	37.39	Bansropan Chamar	INC	30,601	34.57	2,496	2.82
234	Nokha	Jangi Singh Chaudhari	JD	33,039	36.48	Gopal Narain Singh	BJP	24,987	27.59	8,052	8.89
235	Dehri	Md. Ilyas Hussain	JD	34,030	40.01	Vinod Singh	BJP	15,730	18.49	18,300	21.52
236	Nabinagar	Raghubansh Pd. Singh	INC	25,647	31.62	Ram Lakhan Prasad	JD	16,229	20.01	9,418	11.61
237	Deo (SC)	Sahdeo Chaudhary	BJP	34,324	48.53	Dell Keshwar Ram	INC	21,388	30.24	12,936	18.29
238	Aurangabad	Brijmohan Singh	INC	27,134	30.91	Tribhuwan Singh	CPI	15,587	17.75	11,547	13.16
239	Rafiganj	Vijay Kumar Singh	INC	39,169	44.78	Esteyak Ahamad Khan	CPI	28,906	33.05	10,263	11.73
240	Obra	Ram Bilas Singh	JD	34,760	30.75	Raja Ram Singh	IPF	29,048	25.69	5,712	5.06
241	Goh	Ram Sharan Yadav	CPI	46,027	43.68	D.K. Sharma	INC	31,375	29.77	14,652	13.91
242	Arwal	Krishana Nandan Prasad	IND	38,902	31.24	Ramadhar Singh	IPF	33,630	27.00	5,272	4.24
243	Kurtha	Mundrika Singh Yadav	JD	46,270	38.40	Tileshwar Kaushik	IPF	30,124	25.00	16,146	13.40
244	Makhdumpur	Ram Jatan Sinha	INC	60,974	45.64	Anil Kumar	JD	41,833	31.31	19,141	14.33
245	Jahanabad	Hari Lal Prasad Sinha	IND	39,969	31.86	Wasi Ahamad	IPF	28,067	22.38	11,902	9.48
246	Ghosi	Jagdish Sharma	INC	85,107	59.14	Shardanand Singh	CPI	36,267	25.20	48,840	33.94
247	Belaganj	Surender Prasad Yadav	JD	55,799	41.39	Abhiram Sharma	IND	51,297	38.05	4,502	3.34
248	Konch	Ramashraya Prasad Singh	INC	83,096	61.37	Awadh Singh	JD	47,083	34.77	36,013	26.60
249	Gaya Mufassil	Awadhesh Kumar Singh	INC	81,869	64.99	Vinod Kumar Yadvendu	JD	24,618	19.54	57,251	45.45
250	Gaya Town	Prem Kumar	BJP	27,816	29.91	Shakil Ahmad Khan	CPI	22,856	24.58	4,960	5.33
251	Imamganj (SC)	Uday Narapan Choudhary	JD	33,137	37.58	Ram Swaroop Paswan	IND	22,937	26.01	10,200	11.57
252	Gurua	Ramadhar Singh	IND	36,137	31.63	Kaushlendra Kumar Singh	BJP	30,115	26.36	6,022	5.27
253	Bodh Gaya (SC)	Balik Ram	CPI	45,589	46.31	Rajesh Kumar	JD	40,351	40.99	5,238	5.32
254	Barachatti (SC)	Umesh Singh	IPF	31,823	33.46	G.S. Ramchandra Das	INC	17,165	18.05	14,658	15.41
255	Fatehpur (SC)	Ram Naresh Prasad	JD	55,089	45.59	Jitan Ram Manjhi	INC	54,907	45.43	182	0.16
256	Atri	Ranjit Singh	INC	48,586	31.34	Mahesh Singh Yadav	JD	46,794	30.18	1,792	1.16
257	Nawada	Krishna Prasad	BJP	57,374	35.18	Narendra Kumar	INC	42,680	26.17	14,694	9.01
258	Rajauli (SC)	Baboo Lao	BJP	52,120	38.18	Banwari Ram	INC	47,940	35.12	4,180	3.06
259	Gobindpur	Gayatri Devi	INC	36,602	28.99	K.B. Prasad	IND	34,747	27.52	1,855	1.47
260	Warsaliganj	Deo Nandan Prasad	CPI	39,893	33.80	Bandi Shankar Singh	IND	35,672	30.23	4,221	3.57
261	Hisua	Aditya Singh	INC	71,992	59.68	Lal Narayan Singh	CPI	16,271	13.49	55,721	46.19
262	Kodarma	Ramesh Pra. Yadav	JD	56,313	55.18	Umesh Chandra Acarwal	INC	34,705	34.01	21,608	21.17
263	Barhi	Ram Lakhan Sinha	CPI	22,414	34.26	Manoj Ku. Yadav	INC	16,211	24.78	6,203	9.48
264	Chatra (SC)	Mahendra Prasad Bhogta	BJP	38,374	56.98	Shiv Jagat Ram	INC	11,720	17.40	26,654	39.58
265	Simaria (SC)	Upendar Nath Das	BJP	30,801	49.14	Ram Chandra Ram	CPI	18,832	30.04	11,969	19.10
266	Barkagaon	Ramendra Kumar	CPI	27,675	28.71	Rakesh Prasad	BJP	23,880	24.77	3,795	3.94
267	Ramgarh	Arjun Ram	JMM	26,880	30.19	Sabir Ahmad Kuraishi	CPI	25,598	28.75	1,282	1.44
268	Mandu	Tek Lal Mahto	JMM	41,125	40.48	Man Kuwar Bedia	IPF	11,693	11.51	29,432	28.97
269	Hazaribagh	Deodayal	BJP	50,546	52.61	Braj Kishore Jaiswal	INC	30,489	31.74	20,057	20.87
270	Barkatha	Khagendra Prasad	BJP	35,303	37.05	Bhawneshwar Pd. Mehta	CPI	28,875	30.31	6,428	6.74
271	Dhanwar	Harihar Narayan Pravaker	INC	34,677	36.44	Bal Govind Pd. Yadav	IND	15,360	16.14	19,317	20.30
272	Bagodar	Maherdra Prasad Singh	IPF	29,107	34.02	Gautam Sagar Rana	JD	20,808	24.32	8,299	9.70
273	Jamua (SC)	Baldeo Hazra	CPI	36,927	43.86	Sukar Rbidas	BJP	27,254	32.37	9,673	11.49
274	Gandey	Salkhan Soren	JMM	30,238	36.22	Lakshman Swarnkar	BJP	26,250	31.45	3,988	4.77
275	Giridih	Joytindra Prasad	INC	24,391	35.42	Omi Lall Azad	CPI	20,344	29.54	4,047	5.88
276	Dumri	Lal Chand Mahto	JD	30,718	36.98	Shiva Mahto	JMM	19,195	23.11	11,523	13.87
277	Gomia	Madhaw Lal Singh	IND	21,821	24.70	Chhatru Ram Mahto	BJP	21,299	24.11	522	0.59
278	Bermo	Rajendra Pd. Singh	INC	37,018	34.30	Shanque Khan	CPI	31,721	29.39	5,297	4.91
279	Bokaro	Samresh Singh	BJP	49,739	37.67	Aklu Ram Mahto	IND	45,400	34.39	4,339	3.28
280	Tundi	Vinod Bihar Mahato	JMM	23,042	29.11	Udai Kumar Singh	INC	22,743	28.74	299	0.37
281	Baghmara	Om Prakash Lal	INC	30,310	36.02	Jaleshwar Mahato	JMM	14,055	16.70	16,255	19.32
282	Sindri	Anand Mahto	MCC	31,955	34.14	Phool Chand Mandal	BJP	22,602	24.15	9,353	9.99
283	Nirsa	Gurudas Chatterjee	MCC	28,741	31.04	Kripa Shankar Chatterjee	INC	27,291	29.47	1,450	1.57
284	Dhanbad	Surendra Pd. Roy	INC	29,973	31.02	S.K. Shriva	JD	25,340	26.22	4,633	4.80
285	Jharia	Suryadev Singh	JD	56,593	60.20	Mo. Manan Mallik	INC	28,475	30.29	28,118	29.91
286	Chandanikyari (SC)	Gaur Harijan	BJP	25,782	40.09	Haru Rajwar	JMM	23,417	36.41	2,365	3.68
287	Bahrahgora	Devi Pad Upadhyay	CPI	28,760	31.75	Dinesh Kumar Sandgi	JD	19,454	21.48	9,306	10.27
288	Ghatsila (ST)	Surya Singh Basera	IND	25,054	31.74	Shanker Hembram	JMM	17,592	22.28	7,462	9.46
289	Potka (ST)	Hari Ram Sardar	JMM	24,253	33.88	Megh Lal Tudu	BJP	10,606	14.82	13,647	19.06
290	Jugsalai (SC)	Mangal Ram	JMM	28,626	35.92	R.S. Deohari	BJP	14,408	18.08	14,218	17.84
291	Jamshedpur East	Dina Nath Pandey	BJP	35,528	41.33	Bhogendra Mishra	INC	20,948	24.37	14,580	16.96
292	Jamshedpur West	Md. Hasan Rizvi	JMM	27,018	33.06	Mrigendra Pratap Singh	BJP	23,569	28.84	3,449	4.22
293	Ichagarh	Sudhir Mahato	JMM	41,684	50.65	Prabhat Kumar Aditya	INC	15,054	18.29	26,630	32.36
294	Seraikella (ST)	Krishna Mardi	JMM	37,524	46.23	Anant Ram Tudu	BJP	12,591	15.51	24,933	30.72
295	Chaibasa (ST)	Hibar Guria	JMM	10,660	20.44	Munda Radhe Sumbrui	BJP	9,248	17.73	1,412	2.71
296	Majhgaon (ST)	Devendra Nath Champia	INC	12,955	28.06	Goverdhan Nayak	JD	9,182	19.89	3,773	8.17
297	Jaganathpur (ST)	Mangal Singh Lamay	JD	10,763	23.40	Mangal Singh Bobonga	IND	9,304	20.23	1,459	3.17
298	Manoharpur (ST)	Krishna Chandra Munda	INC	9,428	16.59	Govind Chandra Purty	BJP	9,228	16.24	200	0.35
299	Chakradharpur (ST)	Bahadur Uroun	JMM	16,862	28.33	Mathura Bodra	BJP	14,606	24.54	2,256	3.79
300	Kharasawan (ST)	Bijoy Singh Soy	INC	21,767	34.59	Lakhi Ram Majhi	JD	12,735	20.24	9,032	14.35
301	Tamar (ST)	T. Muchi Rai Munda	INC	16,429	24.83	Budhan Lal Munda	CPI(M)	13,807	20.87	2,622	3.96
302	Torpa (ST)	Niral Enem Horo	JKD	24,571	43.97	Leyandar Tiru	INC	13,536	24.22	11,035	19.75
303	Khunti (ST)	Shushila Kerketta	INC	21,769	31.66	Hathi Ram Munda	BJP	20,882	30.37	887	1.29
304	Silli	Rajendra Singh	CPI(M)	27,959	39.13	Keshav Mohto Kamlesh	INC	26,671	37.33	1,288	1.80
305	Khijri (ST)	Duti Pahan	BJP	28,238	33.23	Kalipad Soren	JD	13,373	15.74	14,865	17.49
306	Ranchi	Gulshan Lal Ajmani	BJP	49,560	47.29	Hussain Kasim Kachhi	JD	28,354	27.06	21,206	20.23
307	Hatia	Ramjee Lal Sarda	BJP	19,555	24.01	Vijendra Singh Ishwar	JD	19,343	23.75	212	0.26
308	Kanke (SC)	Ram Chandra Viatha	BJP	28,751	40.45	Samaree Lal	JD	15,624	21.98	13,127	18.47
309	Mandar (ST)	Karam Chandra Bhagot	JD	35,667	45.57	Vishwanath Bhagat	JMM	22,449	28.68	13,218	16.89
310	Sisai (ST)	Lalit Oraon	BJP	26,553	39.18	Bandi Oraon	INC	15,752	23.24	10,801	15.94
311	Kolebira (ST)	Theodore Kiro	INC	24,065	37.44	Emanuel Khariya	JKD	18,756	29.18	5,309	8.26
312	Simdega (ST)	Nirmal Kumar Beshra	BJP	27,317	41.62	Jayati Praksh Tirkey	INC	15,705	23.93	11,612	17.69
313	Gumla (ST)	Jitwahan Baraik	BJP	24,330	34.78	Chist Prakash Tirkey	JKD	16,428	23.48	7,902	11.30
314	Bishnupur (ST)	Ramesn Oraon	BJP	23,538	38.21	Bhukhla Bhagat	INC	19,780	32.11	3,758	6.10
315	Lohardaga (ST)	Indranath Bhagat	INC	19,878	32.76	Chandra Kishore Oraon	BJP	14,838	24.45	5,040	8.31
316	Latehar (SC)	Ramdeo Ram	BJP	19,854	42.03	Hari Darshan Ram	INC	9,897	20.95	9,957	21.08
317	Manika (ST)	Yamuna Singh	BJP	14,923	35.17	Mahabir Bhagat	INC	8,270	19.49	6,653	15.68
318	Panki	Madhu Singh	IND	14,535	22.27	Awadhesh Kumar Singh	JD	13,530	20.73	1,005	1.54
319	Daltonganj	Inder Singh Namdhari	BJP	44,422	53.48	Ishwar Chandra Pandey	INC	14,312	17.23	30,110	36.25
320	Garhwa	Gopinath Singh	BJP	22,086	29.90	Yugal Kishore Pandey	INC	21,327	28.88	759	1.02
321	Bhawanathpur	Girwar Pandey	JD	21,241	28.46	Raj Rajendra Pratap Deo	INC	13,911	18.64	7,330	9.82
322	Bishrampur	Chandrashekhar Dubey	INC	30,050	36.14	Dharmendra Pratap Deo	IND	21,725	26.13	8,325	10.01
323	Chhatarpur (SC)	Laxamn Ram	JD	20,738	38.32	Radha Krishan Kishore	INC	19,218	35.51	1,520	2.81
324	Hussainabad	Dashrath Kumar Singh	BJP	16,210	23.92	Virender Singh	JD	16,047	23.68	163	0.24
