= Revolutionary Youth Association =

Indian students organization

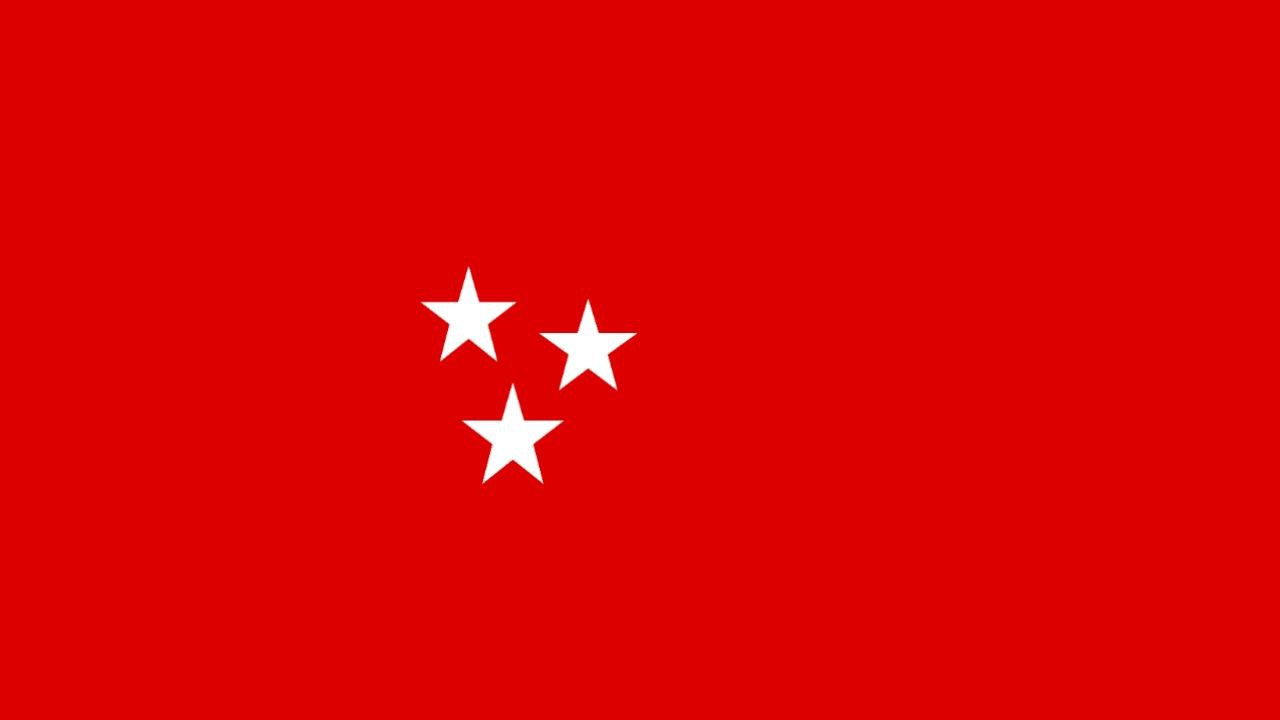
- Abbreviation: RYA
- Formation: 23 March 1990
- Type: Youth organisation
- Legal status: Active
- Headquarters: Charu Bhawan, U-90, Shakarpur, Delhi-110092
- Members: 38,000 (2017)
- National President: Manoj Manzil
- National General Secretary: Niraj Kumar
- Affiliations: CPIML Liberation; IPF (1990-1992)
- Website: https://ryaindia.net

The Revolutionary Youth Association (RYA) is the youth wing of the Communist Party of India (Marxist-Leninist) Liberation). RYA is one of the biggest left-wing youth associations in India. RYA is the biggest left-wing youth association in the Indian states of Bihar, Jharkhand, Gujarat, and Uttarpradesh. The RYA was established on 23 March 1995. Its sixth National Conference was held in Varanasi on 15–16 December 2018. The Conference elected Manoj Manzil as the National President and Niraj Kumar as the General Secretary, along with a national council of 75 members and 9 Central committee members.

The RYA states that it supports universal dignified employment, equitable education, civil liberties, freedom and equality for women, social justice and secularism. It also says that it supports democratic values and the role of science. The RYA also states that it favors establishing ties with other left-wing youth groups, especially in Asia.

The RYA states that it opposes fascism, Dictatorism, anarchism, statism, criminal and NGO trends, as well as attempts to divide Indian youth on caste, class, religious and ethnic divides.
