= Mahesh Paswan =

Indian politician

Member of the Bihar Legislative Assembly
- Incumbent
- Assumed office 14 November 2025
- Preceded by: Shiv Prakash Ranjan
- Constituency: Agiaon

Personal details
- Party: Bharatiya Janata Party
- Profession: Politician

Mahesh Paswan is an Indian politician from Bihar. He has served as a Member of the Legislative Assembly since 2025 representing the Agiaon constituency.

== Political career ==
Paswan won from Agiaon constituency representing Bharatiya Janata Party in the 2025 Bihar Legislative Assembly election. He received 69,412 votes and defeated his nearest rival, Shiv Prakash Ranjan of the Communist Party of India (Marxist–Leninist) Liberation, by a margin of 95 votes.
