= Agiaon Assembly constituency =

Constituency of the Bihar legislative assembly in India

Coordinates: 25.38°N 84.61°E

Agiaon
- Constituency No. 195 for the Bihar Legislative Assembly

Constituency details
- Country: India
- Region: East India
- State: Bihar
- District: Bhojpur
- Lok Sabha constituency: Arrah
- Established: 2008
- Total electors: 263,836

Member of Legislative Assembly
- 18th Bihar Legislative Assembly
- Incumbent Mahesh Paswan
- Party: BJP
- Alliance: NDA
- Elected year: 2025

Agiaon is one of 243 constituencies of legislative assembly of Bihar. It is part of Arrah Lok Sabha constituency along with other assembly constituencies viz. Sandesh, Barhara, Arrah, Tarari, Jagdishpur and Shahpur.

== Area/wards ==
Agiaon Assembly constituency comprises:

- Charpokhari CD block
- Garhani CD block
- Agiaon CD block

== Overview ==
As per the estimates of 2011 census, out of total 352998 population 100% is rural and 0% is urban population. The Scheduled castes (SC) and Scheduled tribes (ST) ratio is 18.3 and 0.03, respectively out of total population. As per the voter list of 2019, there are 262907 electorates and 276 polling stations in this constituency.

== Members of the Legislative Assembly ==
The Agiaon Assembly constituency was created in 2010. The list of the Members of the Legislative Assembly (MLA) representing Agiaon constituency is as follows:

Year	Member	Party
Until 2008: Constituency did not exist
2010	Shivesh Ram	Bharatiya Janata Party
2015	Prabhunath Prasad	Janata Dal (United)
2020	Manoj Manzil	Communist Party of India (Marxist-Leninist) Liberation
2024^	Shiv Prakash Ranjan	Communist Party of India (Marxist-Leninist) Liberation
2025	Mahesh Paswan	Bharatiya Janata Party

== Election results ==
=== 2025 ===
2025 Bihar Legislative Assembly election: Agiaon
Party	Candidate	Votes	%	±%
BJP	Mahesh Paswan	69,412	45.2	
CPI(ML)L	Shiv Prakash Ranjan	69,317	45.14	−16.25
JSP	Ramesh Kumar	3,882	2.53	
Independent	Shyam Bihari Choudhary	2,508	1.63	
BSP	Mukesh Kumar Ram	1,440	0.94	
NOTA	None of the above	3,631	2.36	−0.33
Majority		95	0.06	−34.46
Turnout		153,554	58.2	+5.74
BJP gain from CPI(ML)L		Swing		

=== 2024 bypoll ===
Bihar Legislative Assembly by-election 2024: Agiaon
Party	Candidate	Votes	%	±%
CPI(ML)L	Shiv Prakash Ranjan	73,460	53.03	▼8.36
JD(U)	Prabhunath Prasad	43,625	31.65	▲4.78
NOTA	None of the Above	3,931	2.85	▲0.16
Majority		29,835	21.38	▼13.14
Turnout		1,37,807		
CPI(ML)L hold		Swing		

=== 2020 ===
2020 Bihar Legislative Assembly election: Agiaon
Party	Candidate	Votes	%	±%
CPI(ML)L	Manoj Manzil	86,327	61.39	
JD(U)	Prabhunath Prasad	37,777	26.87	−13.16
LJP	Rajeshwar Paswan	4,972	3.54	
RLSP	Manuram Rathaur	1,765	1.26	
Bhartiya Party (Loktantrik)	Indu Devi	1,601	1.14	
Shoshit Samaj Dal	Suraj Bhan	1,403	1.0	
NOTA	None of the above	3,787	2.69	−0.56
Majority		48,550	34.52	+23.26
Turnout		140,616	52.46	+0.41
CPI(ML)L gain from JD(U)				

=== 2015 ===
2015 Bihar Legislative Assembly election: Agiaon
Party	Candidate	Votes	%	±%
JD(U)	Prabhunath Prasad	52,276	40.03	
BJP	Shivesh Kumar	37,572	28.77	
CPI(ML)L	Manoj Manzil	31,789	24.34	
Independent	Upendra Kumar	1,493	1.15	
NOTA	None of the above	4,244	3.25	
Majority		14,704	11.26	
Turnout		130,615	52.05	
