= Kavita Krishnan =

Indian Politician

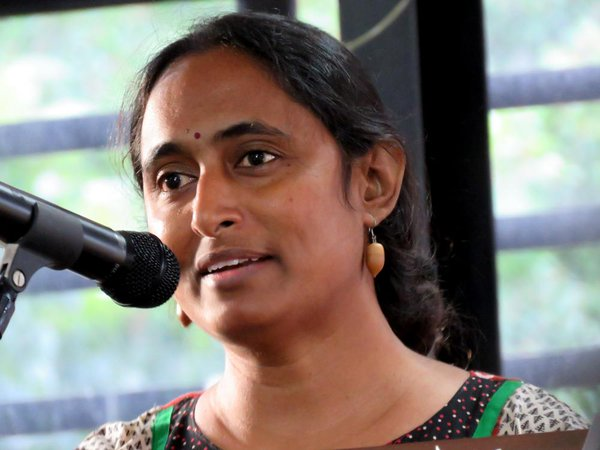

Secretary of the All India Progressive Women's Association
- In office 2017–2022

Politburo Member of CPIML Liberation
- In office 2016–2022

Personal details
- Born: Kavita Krishnan; 1973 (age 52–53) Coonoor, Tamil Nadu
- Party: Communist Party of India (Marxist-Leninist) Liberation
- Education: University of Mumbai; Jawaharlal Nehru University
- Occupation: Politician; Human Rights Activist

Kavita Krishnan is an Indian communist feminist activist who has publicised the problem of violence against women following the 2012 Delhi gang rape of Nirbhaya.

Krishnan was also a politburo member of the Communist Party of India (Marxist–Leninist) Liberation and had been a member of its Central Committee for over two decades. She was also the editor of CPI (M-L) Liberation's monthly publication, Liberation and the Secretary of the AIPWA. She quit CPI (ML) Liberation in 2022.

== Early background and personal life ==
Kavita Krishnan was born to Tamil parents in Coonoor, Tamil Nadu. She grew up in Bhilai, Chhattisgarh. Her father worked as an engineer at a steel plant while her mother taught English. She completed her BA from St. Xavier's College, Mumbai. Krishnan received an MPhil in English Literature at Jawaharlal Nehru University.

=== Early Activism ===
Kavita Krishnan became part of a theater group led by Arun Ferreira in St. Xavier's College, Mumbai (affiliated college of University of Mumbai) and she would participate in street plays and protests. Her serious stint with political activism took place when she joined the Jawaharlal Nehru University where she earned her master's degree and was elected Joint Secretary of the Students' Union in 1995. She was a member of the All India Students Association while she studied in JNU. She became seriously involved with activism when she met the student leader Chandrashekhar Prasad who was also a student at JNU and a member of AISA. Remembered as Chandu by the students of JNU even today, Chandrashekhar was murdered along with fellow CPI(ML) leader Shyam Narayan Yadav on 31 March 1997 in Siwan, Bihar while addressing a street meeting. Kavita Krishnan's life as an activist took a serious turn after this incident. Chandrashekhar, who had been the President of the JNU Students' Union the year before Krishnan was elected the Joint Secretary, was the first to recognise her passion and to suggest her to work full-time for women's rights. Following Chandu's murder, thousands of JNU students participated in mass demonstrations, demanding action against former Rashtriya Janata Dal parliamentarian Mohammad Shahabuddin, whose men, they alleged, had carried out the attack. Krishnan was part of the protests in Delhi, where the student protesters were attacked by Laloo Yadav's men at Bihar Bhawan. She spent eight days in jail for her participation in the protests.

=== Role in Nirbhaya Protests ===
While emerging as one of the most influential activists during the massive anti-rape protests that followed the rape and murder of a 23-year-old girl in India's capital city, New Delhi, Kavita Krishnan has contributed substantially to shaping the discourse of the movement. One of the speeches that she made at the protest outside Delhi Chief Minister Sheila Dikshit's house quickly went viral on YouTube and has received over 60,000 views so far. In this speech, she laid out a kind of manifesto of the movement, one that represented a major break from the securitised, protectionist standpoint which was rife at that time and articulated women's freedom as the main demand. In this speech, she argued against the prevalent commonsense that death penalty was the solution to rape. She pointed out that the conviction rates for rape in India are extremely low and, therefore, methods such as chemical castration and death penalty can't act as deterrents. She made a strong case for arguing on the basis of women's "unqualified freedom", "freedom without fear". Her views on death penalty have been influential in shaping the discourse around rape in the aftermath of the post 16 December anti-rape protests. The demand for "Freedom Without Fear" became a rallying point for anti-rape protesters, and Kavita Krishnan's views on "Freedom" were extensively published.

=== Premature claims on Sri Lankan Easter bombings ===
On 2019 Sri Lanka Easter bombings, Krishnan made a premature claim on Twitter, suggesting that the attack was an act of "majoritarian terror against religious minorities." Khemta H Jose of The Quint wrote, "Kavita Krishnan, an Indian icon of the left, jumped to blame Sri Lanka's 'majority' (Sinhalese) for the Colombo bombings, before any investigation was completed – it's just one small example of the difference in the way the left deals with terror or extremism based on the identity of the perpetrator."

=== Fallout with CPI (M-L) Liberation ===
Through a Facebook post on 1 September 2022, Krishnan announced that the CPI (M-L) Liberation has relieved her of all party posts and responsibilities at her request; however, she will continue to remain a member of the party. This is being seen as a fallout of her differences with the leadership on various issues including those related to China and the Russo-Ukrainian War. In the preceding months, she had often criticised socialist and communist regimes.

She wrote in a social media post,

“My friends on the Indian Left… could never reconcile to the fact that the peoples of USSR and especially its colonized Republics, chose not to retain the Soviet Union and that Gorbachev at the end of the day respected that choice instead of ‘imposing socialism by bayonets’ on people who had rejected it,… It is not enough to discuss the Stalin regime, USSR, or China as failed socialisms but as some of the world’s worst authoritarianisms that serve as a model for authoritarian regimes everywhere.”

=== Trolling ===
She had told reporters,

“These trolls … they are going after me regularly, routinely, for my skin color, for my looks, telling me I’m not worth raping, what kind of torture and rape I should be subjected to, telling me what kind of men I should be sleeping with … and on and on and on, more and more.”

== Book reception: Fearless Freedom ==
Fearless Freedom by Kavita Krishnan was published in May 2020.

=== Popular reception by Women's Web ===
A more popular reception of Fearless Freedom was done by Women's Web, a popular Indian blogpost which celebrates women's voices. Author Piyusha Vir talks about how Fearless Freedom acknowledges that, ‘Confinement to the home itself is a form of violence that is not even acknowledged.’ and how that acknowledgement came as a "rude reality check" for her. This reality check made Vir think of how women's lives in India are surveilled in the name of safety, and it makes her question, What can we do to dismantle this deeply patriarchal society and the system?

=== Academic reception by Aishwarya Bhuta ===
Aishwarya Bhuta gave a book review of Fearless Freedom in the Society and Culture in South Asia journal. Bhuta talks about how this book is written with a backdrop of the 2012 Delhi Gang rape case which makes Krishnan reiterate her statement: "Death penalty is not a deterrent to rape," and how women's fearless freedom should be protected at all costs. This review by Aishwarya Bhuta talks a little bit about how the style of how this book was written; says the writing style is simple, and it consists of personal experiences, excerpts from autobiographies, instances from Cinema and poetry

== Recognition ==
She was recognized as one of the BBC's 100 women of 2014.
