= Shiv Prakash Ranjan =

Indian politician

Member of the Bihar Legislative Assembly
- In office 4 June 2024 – 14 November 2025
- Preceded by: Manoj Manzil
- Succeeded by: Mahesh Paswan
- Constituency: Agiaon

Personal details
- Born: 10 February 1991 (age 35)
- Party: Communist Party of India (Marxist–Leninist) (Liberation)

Shiv Prakash Ranjan is an Indian politician from Bihar, and a member of the Communist Party of India (Marxist–Leninist) Liberation. He was elected as a member of the Bihar Legislative Assembly from Agiaon Vidhan Sabha constituency on 4 June 2024.
