= Vinod Mishra =

Indian communist politician (1947–1998)

General Secretary of the CPI(ML) Liberation
- In office 1975–1998
- Preceded by: Subrata Dutta
- Succeeded by: Dipankar Bhattacharya

West Bengal State Secretary of the CPI(ML) Liberation
- In office 1974–1975
- Preceded by: Saroj Dutta
- Succeeded by: Kartik Paul

Personal details
- Born: 24 March 1947 Jabalpur, Central Provinces and Berar, British India
- Died: 18 December 1998 (aged 51) Lucknow, Uttar Pradesh, India
- Party: CPI(ML) Liberation
- Occupation: Politician

Vinod Mishra (24 March 1947 – 18 December 1998) was an Indian communist politician. He served as the general secretary of the Communist Party of India (Marxist-Leninist) Liberation from 1975 to 1998.

== Early life and student activism ==
Mishra was born to Suryakesh Mishra in Jabalpur. The family moved to Kanpur in 1955. Mishra studied at Adarsh Banga Vidyalaya Inter College. Later he graduated from Kanyakubja Degree College and was admitted at the Christ Church Degree College for post-graduate studies in Mathematics. He went on to study at the Faculty of mechanical engineering at the Regional Engineering College in Durgapur in 1966. Mishra became associated with a group of leftwing students, who soon developed linkages to the AICCCR. Mishra led student rallies and a campus strike. By mid-1969 he had become a professional revolutionary.

Mishra became the secretary of the Durgapur Local Organising Committee of the Communist Party of India (Marxist-Leninist) (formed out of the AICCCR) in the early 1970s. However, he was arrested (along with Mahadev Mukherjee). After having pass a period at Asansol hospital following brutal beatings by the police, he was sent to the Baharampur Central Jail. Mishra continued to conduct political activities inside the prison.

== 1972–1975 ==
He was unconditionally released from prison on 20 June 1972 as one year without trial had passed. However, his release arose suspicion in the CPI(ML). He was deployed to a remote village in the Agradwip area of Burdwan district. Along with Kartik Paul, he organized a peasants movement in the district. At the same time, chaos reigned in the CPI(ML). Mishra and Pal were included in the Burdwan Regional Committee of the party. In 1973 the CPI(ML) was split, with one group led by Sharma and another by Mahadev Mukherjee. Mishra initially belonged to Mukherjee's party, but he and the Burdwan Regional Committee broke with Mukherjee in September 1973. Mishra sought contact with the Sharma group, but the Burdwan Regional Committee was later divided and Mishra denounced the political line of Sharma (a critique, which amongst other things, called for the formation of open mass organizations, a move that almost constituted a heresy in the CPI(ML) movement at the time).

In 1974 Mishra came into contact with Subrata Dutta (Jauhar), a leader of armed struggle in the plain areas of Bihar. On 28 July 1974 (the second death anniversary of Charu Majumdar) a new party Central Committee was formed with Jauhar as General Secretary and Mishra and Swadesh Bhattacharya (Raghu) as members. The reorganized party became known as the 'anti-Lin Biao' group (whilst the faction of Mahadev Mukherjee constituted the 'pro-Lin Biao' group). The party would also become known as the CPI(ML) Liberation.

== Party leader ==
Mishra served as West Bengal secretary of the new party organization. Under Mishra's leadership new dalams (guerilla squads) were formed. In November 1975 Jauhar was killed. Mishra became the new party General Secretary in a reorganized five-member Central Committee. Mishra organized a second party congress, held clandestinely in the rural areas of Gaya district in February 1976. The congress unanimously re-elected Mishra as General Secretary.

On 1–2 January 1979 Mishra was encircled by police forces at Badpathujote in the Phansidewa area of Darjeeling district. In the midst of a prolonged gun-battle, Mishra sustained multiple injuries and his comrade Bakul Sen (alias Amal) was killed. Mishra was able to escape, assisted by the dalam commander Nemu Singh. Mishra secretly visited China in 1979.

After the 11 July 1996 massacre in Bathani Tola, in which 21 Dalits were killed by Ranvir Sena, Mishra declared an 'eye for an eye' policy of vengeance against the perpetrators of the massacre.

Mishra was re-elected General Secretary of the party at the sixth congress of CPI(ML) Liberation in Varanasi in October 1997.

== Political legacy ==
Mishra was the political architect of the process of re-orientation of CPI(ML) Liberation. By 1976 the party had adopted a position that armed struggle would be combined with building a broad anti-Congress democratic front movement. The process further elaborated through an internal rectification process initiated in late 1977. In the early 1980s CPI(ML)Liberation began building an open non-party mass movement (in direct contradiction to the original policy of CPI(ML)), the Indian People's Front (founded in April 1982). The construction of IPF, through which the underground party could develop links to other democratic forces on the basis of a popular, democratic and patriotic programme, was based on interventions by Mishra. After the fifth party congress of CPI(ML)Liberation, Mishra left his underground life. He made his first public appearance in 25 years at a rally on the Parade Grounds of Calcutta in December 1992. The CPI(ML), came out in the open and was registered with the Election Commission of India on August 16, 1994. Concerned that the acronym of the party was too similar to that of the Communist Party of India (Marxist), CPI(M), the Election Commission registered the name of the party as CPI(ML)-Liberation, after the Party's organ. Following its registration and the disbanding of its open front (the Indian People's Front), the party began openly contesting elections under its own banner by 1996. However although Mishra broke with the dogmas of the early CPI(ML), he never renounced Charu Majumdar's legacy.

== Death ==
On 18 December 1998, in connection with a Central Committee meeting in Lucknow, Mishra suffered a heart attack and died later the same day. He was cremated in Patna on 22 December 1998, with thousands of followers taking part in the ceremony. "The Internationale" was played at the funeral. His body was wrapped in the red flag as it was cremated at the electric crematorium at Bansghat. Guests at the funeral included former Union Minister Chaturanan Mishra (of the Communist Party of India) and the Nepalese communist leader Madhav Kumar Nepal.

== Personal life ==
Mishra married thrice; in 1974 to Jyotsna (an underground cadre), in 1983 to Shikha (a party cadre) from Calcutta and in 1991 to fellow Central Committee member Kumudini Pati.

== See also ==
- Jagdish Mahto
