= All India Kisan Sangharsh Coordination Committee =

- Abbreviation: AIKSCC
- Formation: 6 July 2017 (9 years ago)
- Legal status: Active
- Headquarters: Delhi
- Region served: India
- Website: aikscc.in

All India Kisan Sangarsh Coordination Committee (Abbreviated AIKSCC) is a pan-Indian umbrella organisation comprising 250 various farmers' organisations. The committee was formed with the integration of 130 farmers' organisation after the death of six farmers in alleged police firing in Mandsaur, Madhya Pradesh in June 2017.

== Major constituents ==
1. All India Kisan Sabha (Ajoy Bhavan)
2. All India Kisan Sabha (Ashoka Road)
3. All India Kisan Mahasabha (AIKM)
4. Punjab Kisan Union
5. Andhra Pradesh Vyavsaya Vruthidarula Union
6. Bharatiya Kisan Union (Dakaunda)
7. Karnataka Rajya Raitha Sangha
8. National Alliance of People's Movements (NAPM)
9. Narmada Bachao Andolan
10. Swabhimani Shetkari Saghtana
11. Swaraj Abhiyan
12. All India Krishak Khet Majdoor Sangathan (AIKKMS)
