= Dipankar Bhattacharya =

Indian politician (born 1960)

General Secretary of the CPI(ML) Liberation
- Incumbent
- Assumed office 1998
- Preceded by: Vinod Mishra

Personal details
- Born: December 1960 (age 65) Guwahati, Assam, India
- Party: CPI(ML) Liberation
- Education: Ramakrishna Mission Vidyalaya, Narendrapur; Indian Statistical Institute
- Occupation: Politician

Dipankar Bhattacharya (born December 1960) is an Indian politician and the national general secretary of the Communist Party of India (Marxist–Leninist) Liberation. He was the top ranker in the 1979 Higher Secondary board examination and has an M.Stat. degree from the Indian Statistical Institute. Bhattacharya succeeded Vinod Mishra as national general secretary of the party in 1998. He was formerly the secretary of the Indian People's Front and the All India Central Council of Trade Unions.

== Early life and education ==
Dipankar Bhattacharya was born in Guwahati, Assam in December 1960. His father, Baidyanath Bhattacharya, was an employee of the Indian Railways. He studied at the Ramakrishna Mission Vidyalaya in Narendrapur, near Kolkata and was the top ranker in the 1979 board examination of the West Bengal Higher Secondary board. After completing his higher secondary education, he joined the Indian Statistical Institute, Kolkata. He graduated with a Bachelor of Statistics (B.Stat.) degree in 1982 and completed his post-graduation with a Master of Statistics (M.Stat.) degree in 1984.

== Political views ==
Bhattacharya states that a large section of the population is rendered invisible in the country and that only a tiny minority holds the reins of political power and benefits from economic progress. He holds the view that economic growth in India has not coincided with the empowerment of people and defines empowerment in terms of material issues such as employment, education, housing, and hygiene. He argues that the policies of privatisation and commercialisation of healthcare and education are contradictory to the vision of an empowered India and promote further disempowerment.

== Political career ==
Dipankar Bhattacharya became involved in political work during his studies at the Indian Statistical Institute. He served as the general secretary of the Indian People's Front between 1982 and 1994, and later became the general secretary of the All India Central Council of Trade Unions. In December 1987, he was elected to the Central Committee of the Communist Party of India (Marxist–Leninist) Liberation. After the demise of Vinod Mishra, who was the general secretary of the party, Bhattacharya was unanimously elected to the post.
