= Lal Sena =

Communist militia group in India

- लाल सेना
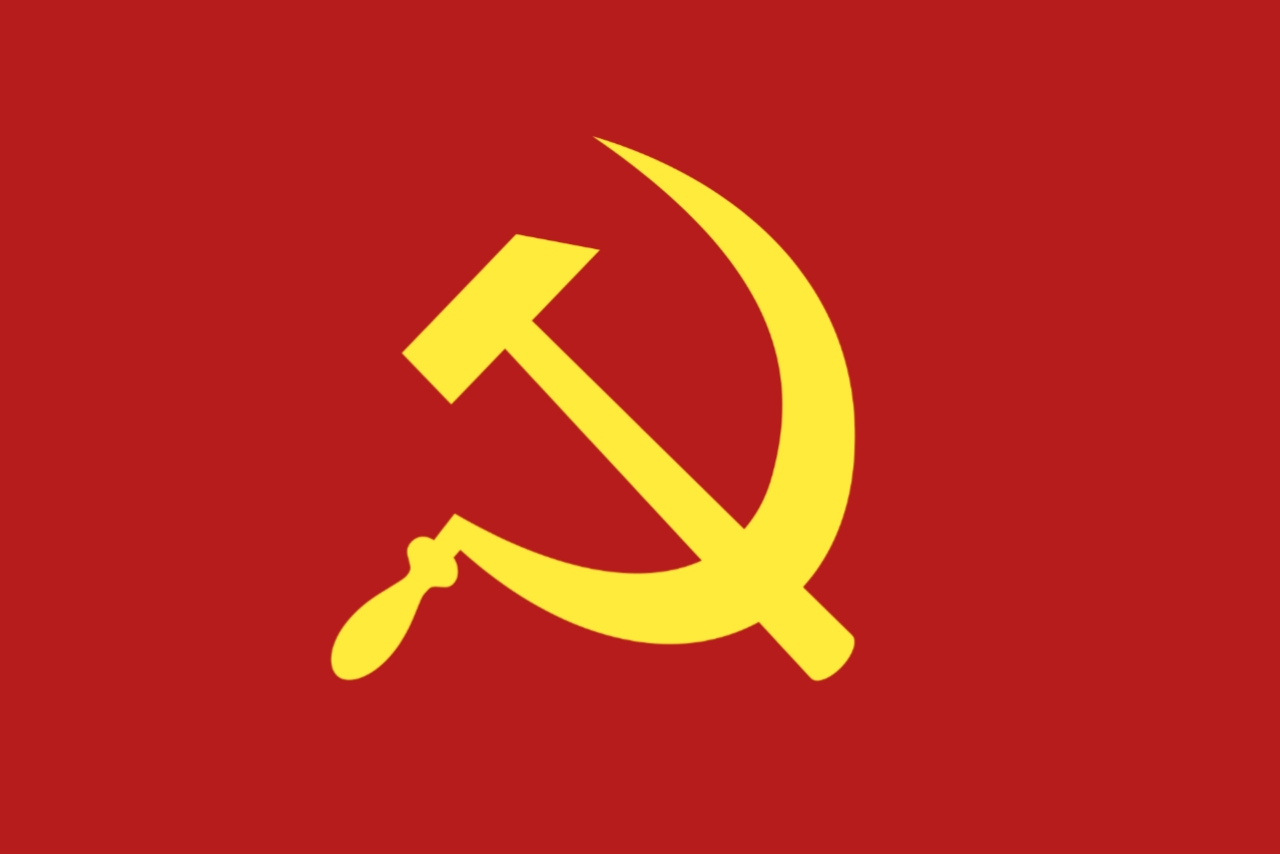
- Active: 1974–1976 Traces of activity until 1990s
- Allegiance: CPI(ML) Liberation
- Type: Armed Guerrilla Squad
- Role: Land Seizure from the landlords, Guerrilla warfare

Lal Sena (लाल सेना; lit. Red Army) was an organised armed militia of CPIML Liberation in northeastern India, across the terrains of central Bihar, north-west of today's Jharkhand, and a few districts of eastern Uttar Pradesh. It was formed mainly by lower caste (middle and lower class) peasantry and landless labourers. It was active from 1974 - 1990

== Background ==
In 1960s, when the Naxalite movement started under the leadership of Communist Party of India (Marxist–Leninist), the poor peasantry and agricultural labourers who belonged mainly to the lower castes started taking side with the communists in central Bihar across the districts of Bhojpur, Gaya, Nalanda, Patna and Aurangabad. Several violent armed clashes occurred between the landlords and poor/landless peasantry. During the 1970s, CPI (ML) faced hard offence from central and state governments throughout India and splintered into several ML factions. In 1974, one of the ML factions was able to hold on to the grounds and reorganised itself into the CPI(ML) Liberation political party.

Meanwhile, the landlords/landowners most of whom economically were from upper class peasantry (mainly upper caste ) organised themselves based on caste lines into several landlord gentries. In retaliation Lal Sena guerrilla armed squads, were organised by then underground CPI (ML) Liberation.

== After 2005 ==
Since the late 2000s, Lal Sena's squad activity has been curtailed. The CPI (ML) Liberation party's movements took a militant but democratic approach through legalised workers, peasants, students, youth and women organisations, as noted by Dr. Sanjay K. Jha:

"The CPI-ML (Liberation), which had a formidable presence in the central parts of undivided Bihar, decided to function as an over ground political party in 1992. It was stated that "the party does not rule out the possibility under a set of exceptional national and international circumstances, the balance of social and economic forces may even permit peaceful transfer of central power to revolutionary forces". It was, however, added that the party must prepare itself for winning the ultimate decisive victory through an armed struggle", though it admitted that the situation was not ripe for such a movement. Reports suggest that it still maintains underground squad in some regions. The party also has a string of organizations to mobilize students, women and workers. They are: All India Students Association, Bihar Pradesh Kisan Sabha, All India Coordination Committee of Trade Unions, All India Progressive Women's Association and Jan Sanskritik Manch."

== See also ==
- Ranvir Sena
- Kuer Sena
- List of communist parties in India
