= All India Progressive Women's Association =

Indian women's organisation

- Formation: 1991
- Type: Women's organisation
- Legal status: Active
- Headquarters: New Delhi, India
- General secretary: Meena Tiwari
- President: Dr Rati Rao
- Acting Secretary: Kavita Krishnan
- Affiliations: CPIML Liberation

All India Progressive Women's Association (AIPWA) is a women's organisation committed to achieving equality and women's emancipation. It has an organizational presence in 21 states in India. It was founded in 1991 as a national level mass organisation of women. AIPWA is the women's wing of the CPIML Liberation.
