= Indian People's Front =

- President: Nagbhushan Patnaik
- Secretary: Dipankar Bhattacharya
- Founder: Vinod Mishra
- Founded: April 1982
- Dissolved: March 1994

The Indian People's Front (IPF) was a mass front organisation founded in Delhi between 24–26 April 1982. It was conceptualised by Vinod Mishra and it was operated as the open mass front of the CPIML Liberation between 1982–1994. The front primarily worked for the social and economic upliftment of Adivasis, Dalits and impoverished sections of society and mobilised them through the means of unions, rallies and conventions.

It had a significant presence in the state of Bihar (including present day Jharkhand) and also operated in the states of Uttar Pradesh, Uttarakhand, Punjab and West Bengal attempting to project itself as a national party. It was disbanded when the Communist Party of India (Marxist–Leninist) Liberation began contesting elections on its own, inheriting its organisation.

The leadership of the front included Nagbhushan Patnaik and Dipankar Bhattacharya. The chairperson of the Autonomous State Demand Committee, Jayanta Rongpi was also a member of the central committee. The central committee also included Rameshwar Prasad and Ganauri Azad Harijan, among others.

== History ==
=== Foundation ===
In 1979, the Communist Party of India (Marxist–Leninist) Liberation held a conference which sanctioned the formation of an open mass organisation. The idea was conceptualized by the general secretary Vinod Mishra to enable the party to organise with other democratic forces on the lines of a "popular, democratic and patriotic programme" and participate in electoral politics. The party had been underground since the imposition of the Emergency in India. The Indian People's Front was launched in a conference organised by the Communist Party of India (Marxist–Leninist) Liberation which was held in Delhi between 24–26 April 1982. The conference was attended by the splinter factions of the Communist Party of India (Marxist–Leninist) led by Nagbhushan Patnaik and Chandra Pulla Reddy. It was intended to project itself as a "national alternative" to the Indira Gandhi led Indian National Congress. In the beginning, the front was projected as a united front of different revolutionary groups but most other factions dropped out during its formation and it effectively became a mass organisation of the Communist Party of India (Marxist–Leninist) Liberation. Satyanarayan Singh publicly denounced and ridiculed the notion of the front becoming a "national alternative". On 15 October 1982, the front organised a mass rally against the Bihar Press Bill which witnessed a participation of 100,000 people according to mainstream media sources.

=== Second conference ===
The Indian People's Front (IPF) held its second conference in Kolkata between 4–6 November 1984, in midst of the turmoil following the assassination of Indira Gandhi. It contested 49 seats in the 1985 Bihar Legislative Assembly election but failed to win a single seat. On 19 April 1986, the police opened fire on a protest gathering of landless farmers (primarily dalits) which resulted in the deaths of 23 people in Arwal, Bihar. Civil rights activists described the massacre as part of a systematic eradication of the moblisation of impoverished people by branding them as "Naxalite" and killing them in police encounters in collaboration with private armies and militias of rich zamindars (landlords) such as the Ranvir Sena. In August, the IPF organised an armed gherao (picketing) of the Bihar Legislative Assembly in protest of the massacre. The protest is claimed by the Communist Party of India (Marxist–Leninist) Liberation, to mark a new phase in the assertiveness of revolutionary democratic forces. In the same year, the front organised a "national convention of women" in Kolkata which saw a participation of around 1000 women. The convention took the initiative of giving attention to women's issues while attempting to foster cooperation and synthesis between communist women's organisations and autonomous women's groups. In an address to the convention, the president of the women's cell of the front stated that feminism and Marxism were complementary ideologies. The front also organised an "all India worker's convention" in Ambernath, near Mumbai in November 1987, with trade union leader Datta Samant as the convener.

=== Mandal commission & Economic liberalisation ===
In the 1989 Indian general election, the Indian People's Front (IPF) was able to win the Arrah constituency in Bihar with Rameshwar Prasad as the candidate. It was also able to win 7 seats and secure the second highest vote share in 14 constituencies in the 1990 Bihar Legislative Assembly election. Over the years, the front had acquired a large share of the Scheduled Caste voters from the Indian National Congress in Bihar. It took the position of supporting reservations solely on the basis of social and educational backwardness and supported the implementation of the recommendations of the Mandal Commission. In the 1990 election, the IPF had contested 82 seats and received a vote share of 10.56% on the contested seats. During the economic liberalisation in India, it launched campaigns against price hikes and for the right to work, adopting a traditional leftist discourse. On 8 October 1990, a national rally with the slogan of dam bandho kaam do (check prices and give jobs) was organised in Delhi by the front. In the same month, it organised a mass rally in Patna which was noted to be the largest rally in the recorded history of the city.

In the 1991 Indian general election, the IPF lost the seat of Arrah constituency but was able to send a member to the parliament (Jayanta Rongpi) through the Autonomous State Demand Committee in the Karbi Anglong constituency. In the same year, four of its members in the Bihar Legislative Assembly defected to the Janata Dal under the leadership of Lalu Prasad Yadav at the height of polarisation on the Mandal issue. In Uttar Pradesh, the party publication Liberation accused the Samajwadi Party of targeting the cadre and lower caste support base of the Indian People's Front with state violence and then providing them with protection if they defected preventing it from successfully organising the way it had in Bihar. On 14 February 1992, in the wake of rising Hindu nationalism in India, the Bharatiya Kisan Sangh (farmer's union affiliated to the Bharatiya Janata Party) killed 14 Scheduled caste landless labourers for supporting the Indian People's Front in Tikshora village near Patna. At the same time, the front was able to expand its footprint in Punjab when its candidate Surjan Singh Joga won the Joga constituency in the 1992 Punjab Legislative Assembly election.

=== Disbandment ===
In December 1992, the Communist Party of India (Marxist–Leninist) Liberation held its fifth congress in Kolkata. Following which the party came out of the underground and eventually disbanded the Indian People's Front in 1994. The Samajik Parivartan Rally (Social Change Rally) on 18 March 1994 was the last rally called by the front. The rally was reported to have been a gathering of tens of thousands of bare-footed and starving workers who had marched to Patna from all over Bihar; some having traveled over 100 kilometres (62 mi) on foot to reach the venue. At the time, political observers described the front to be the fastest growing leftist movement in India. From 1995 onward the party began contesting elections on its own, substituting the role of the former front.

== Affiliated organisations ==
The Indian People's Front (IPF) had a number of unorganised sector unions in Bihar.

- Rickshaw-Thela Chalak Mazdoor Sangha (RTCMS): a union of rickshaw and handcart drivers. Ganauri Azad Harijan was the president of the union and a member of the national executive of the Indian People's Front.
- Bihar Jhuggi-Jhopri Bashi Sangha (BJJBS): an organisation of slum dwellers in Patna. Dinesh Singh was a fish seller and the president of the BJJBS.
- Uttarakhand Popular Anti-Liquor Movement: The movement for the restriction and regulation of liquor sales in Uttarakhand was also affiliated to the IPF from the founding conference.

== See also ==
- BAMCEF
- Bahujan Samaj Party
- Lal Sena
- All India Students Association
