= Agiaon =

Agiaon अगिआंव
- Village
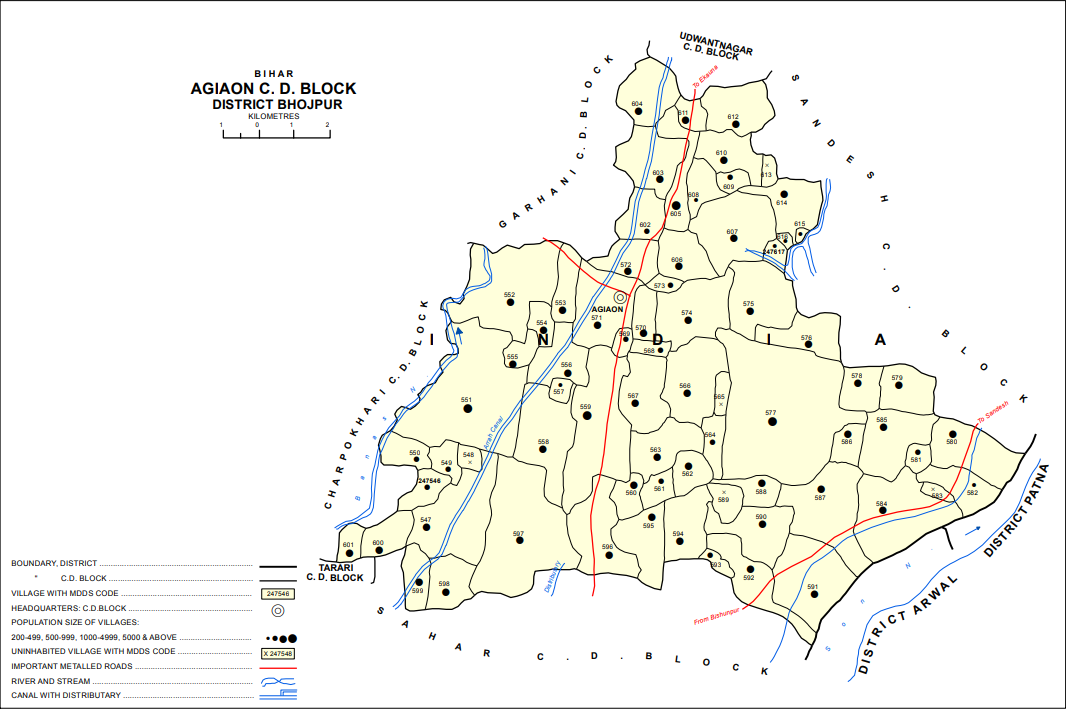
- Map of Agiaon block

- Location in Bihar, India Agiaon (India)
- Coordinates: 25°22′39″N 84°36′33″E
- Country: India
- State: Bihar
- Division: Patna
- District: Bhojpur

Area
  - Total: 3.47 km^{2} (1.34 sq mi)
- Elevation: 75 m (246 ft)

Population (2011)
  - Total: 4,801
  - Density: 1,380/km^{2} (3,580/sq mi)

Languages
  - Official: Hindi
  - Regional: Bhojpuri
- Time zone: UTC+5:30 (IST)

Agiaon, historically documented as Ugeown (Hindi: अगिआंव) is a Gram Panchayat and corresponding community development block in Bhojpur district of Bihar, India. As of 2011, its population was 4,801, in 835 households. The total block population was 148,373, in 23,117 households.

== History ==
The earliest mention of this village is found in 1873 in a report on Cholera cases in Shahabad district where 10 cases were report in the village during the Cholera pandemic.

== Demographics ==
Agiaon is a rural block with no large urban centres. In 2011, its sex ratio was 920 females to every 1000 males, which was higher than the Bhojpur district average of 907. The sex ratio was higher in the 0-6 age group, with a ratio of 950, which was above the district ratio of 918. Members of scheduled castes made up 16.68% of block residents (compared with the district-wide 15.59%) and members of scheduled tribes made up 0.03% (district-wide 0.51%). The block's literacy rate was 67.90%, which was lower than the district-wide 70.47%. There was a 27.75% gender literacy gap in the block, with 81.15% of men but only 53.40% of women able to read and write (the district-wide gap was 23.71%).

Most of Agiaon block's workforce was employed in agriculture in 2011, with 30.54% of workers being cultivators who owned or leased their own land and another 47.60% being agricultural labourers who worked someone else's land for wages. 5.36% were household industry workers, and the remaining 16.50% were other workers. Most workers in the block were men: 37,986 were male and 17,121 were female.

== List of villages ==
Agiaon block contains the following 72 villages: (GP = Gram Panchayat)

Village name	Total land area (hectares)	Population (in 2011)
Agiaon (GP & block headquarters)	347	4,801
Narayanpur (GP)	586	6,476
Chiraili	90	838
Dilia (GP)	463	4,108
Kashipur Chamari	40	0
Anantpur	72	730
Akurha	98	971
Berath	900	5,137
Ratnarh (GP)	565	4,847
Laharpa	128	1,453
Dumaria	66	1,004
Dhakni	73	1,583
Lasarhi	216	2,627
Bisamhra	43	304
Situhari	367	2,133
Bhaluni	92	1,872
Seothara	72	978
Muradpur	108	1,195
Chhaprapur	225	2,158
Dihra	93	981
Mahpur	49	0
Chansi (GP)	346	3,810
Banauli	270	2,441
Keshwarpur	53	833
Chauria	45	582
Ekauna	91	1,077
Kharainacha	132	1,544
Isarpura	49	714
Poswan (GP)	341	3,490
Ahila	345	2,477
Kheri	202	1,706
Bargaon (GP)	1,248	10,748
Megharia	144	1,278
Kamaria	193	2,004
Kirkiri (GP)	313	4,247
Chipura	47	641
Narainaganj	184	279
Dundhua	27	0
Barhampur Mehdanra	493	3,044
Chilhar	300	4,188
Tara Chak	86	1,748
Karbasin (GP)	433	2,846
Gordiha	90	1,218
Amarpur	86	0
Nadhi	273	3,469
Nonaur (GP)	425	4,691
Muzaffarpur	224	1,450
Madhopur	45	591
Baghi	223	1,724
Sewantha (GP)	213	1,992
Baruna (GP)	342	3,528
Maranpur	743	4,807
Gorpa	176	1,792
Bhikhampur	121	1,724
Kharaich	125	1,212
Bisambharpur	68	1,011
Ranni	150	503
Araila	240	2,762
Bankat	234	1,346
Pauna (GP)	192	5,014
Dhobha	184	1,713
Khaneth	401	1,732
Sauna	128	238
Misraulia	50	757
Narauni	192	1,168
Bhagwanpur	65	1,930
Khopira (GP)	224	3,742
Lahauripur	33	0
Panwar (GP)	234	3,236
Paharpur Khurd	25	427
Rudarpur	21	434
Ekauni	38	269

== See also ==
- Narayanpur
