= Communist Party of India (Marxist–Leninist) Liberation =

Communist political party in India

- Abbreviation: CPI(ML), CPI–ML, CPIML(L), CPI–ML(L), CPIML Liberation
- General Secretary: Dipankar Bhattacharya
- Founder: Subrata Dutta; Vinod Mishra; Swadesh Bhttacharya
- Founded: 1974; 52 years ago
- Split from: Communist Party of India (Marxist–Leninist)
- Headquarters: Charu Bhawan, U-90, Shakarpur, Delhi-110092
- Newspaper: Liberation (English); Deshabrati (Bengali)
- Student wing: All India Students' Association
- Youth wing: Revolutionary Youth Association
- Women's wing: All India Progressive Women's Association
- Labour wing: • All India Central Council of Trade Unions; • All India Agricultural and Rural Labour Association
- Peasant's wing: All India Kisan Mahasabha
- Ideology: Communism; Marxism–Leninism; Mao Zedong Thought
- Political position: Far-left
- Colours: Red
- ECI status: State Party
- Alliance: INDIA (National); Mahagathbandhan (Bihar); Mahagathbandhan (Jharkhand); Left Front (Tamil Nadu); Left Front+ (West Bengal)
- Seats in Rajya Sabha: 0 / 245
- Seats in Lok Sabha: 2 / 543
- Seats in State Legislative Assembly: List 2 / 243 (Bihar) 2 / 81 (Jharkhand)
- Number of states and union territories in government: 1 / 31

Election symbol
- Flag with Stars

Party flag
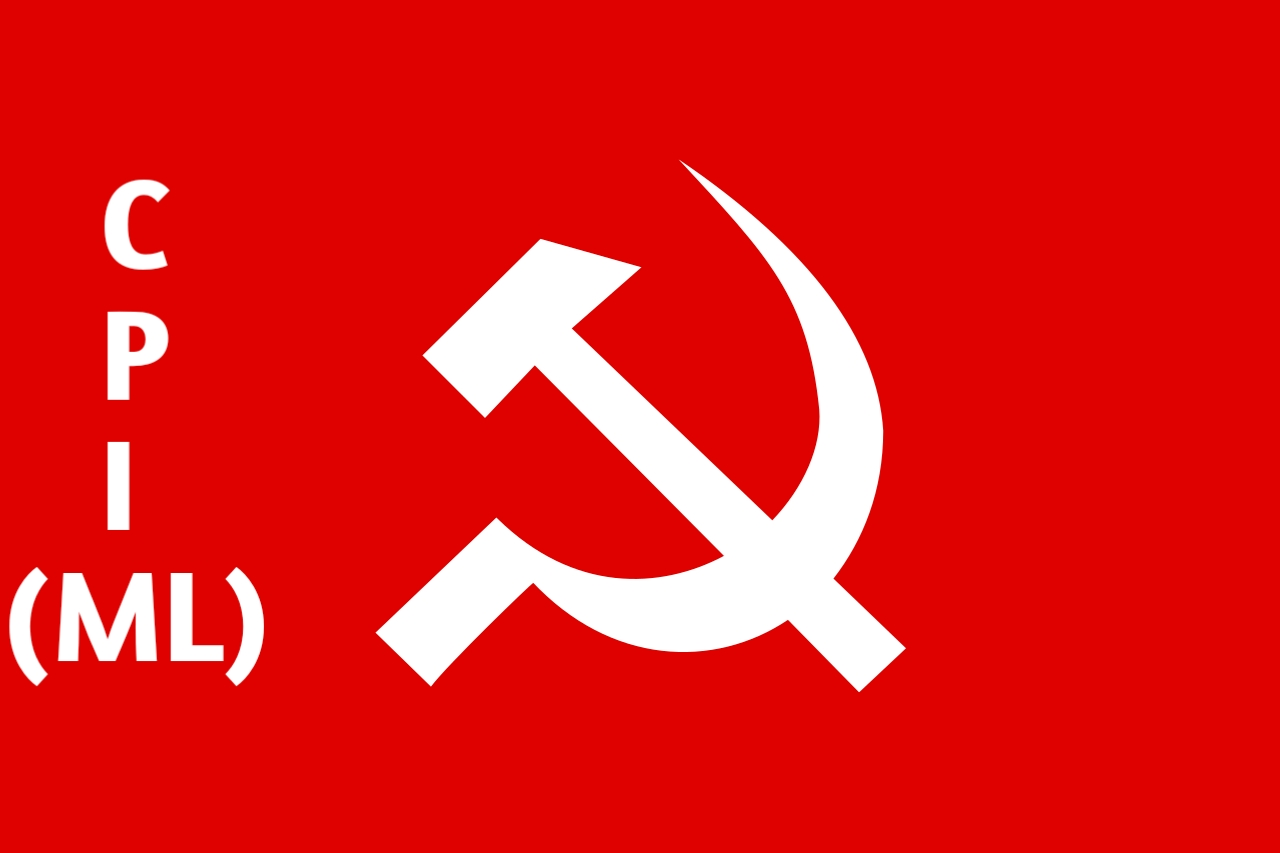

Website
- cpiml.net

The Communist Party of India (Marxist–Leninist) Liberation (in brief CPI(ML)L) is a Marxist-Leninist and Maoist party political party in India. The party is represented in Bihar and Jharkhand Legislative Assemblies. Since 2023, CPIML Liberation is also a member of the INDIA bloc. In Bihar, the party has significant base amongst the Extremely Backward Castes and the Scheduled Castes. It was successful in mobilising Upper Backward Caste groups such as Koeris in some districts of central Bihar, prior to the rise of Lalu Prasad Yadav. The party faced existential crisis when a large section of its Koeri and Yadav support base defected to Rashtriya Janata Dal in 1990s. However, the ideological commitment of its cadre protected it from disintegration.

== History ==
In 1973, the original Communist Party of India (Marxist–Leninist) split, with one group led by Sharma and another by Mahadev Mukherjee. Vinod Mishra initially belonged to Mukherjee's party, but he and the Burdwan Regional Committee broke with Mukherjee in September 1973. Mishra sought contact with the Sharma group, but the Burdwan Regional Committee was later divided and Mishra denounced the political line of Sharma (a critique, which amongst other things, called for the formation of open mass organizations, a move that almost constituted a heresy in the CPI (ML) movement at the time).

In 1974, Mishra came into contact with Subrata Dutta (Jauhar), a leader of armed struggle in the plain areas of Bihar. On 28 July 1974 (the second death anniversary of Charu Majumdar), a new party Central Committee was formed with Jauhar as General Secretary and Mishra and Swadesh Bhattacharya (Raghu) as members. The reorganized party became known as the 'anti-Lin Biao' group (whilst the faction of Mahadev Mukherjee constituted the 'pro-Lin Biao' group). The anti-Lin Biao group became known as the CPIML Liberation.

In November 1975, Jauhar was killed during Lal Sena activities. Mishra became the new party General Secretary in a reorganized five-member Central Committee. Mishra organized a second party congress, held clandestinely in the rural areas of Gaya district in February 1976. The congress unanimously re-elected Mishra as General Secretary.

=== Reorientation and rectification ===
Mishra was the political architect of the process of re-orientation of CPIML Liberation. By 1976 the party had adopted a position that armed struggle would be combined with building a broad anti-Congress democratic front movement. The process was further elaborated through an internal rectification process initiated in late 1977. Party study circles and party schools were started from central to the block level of the party structure. The theory of two line tactics started to develop.

In 1981, the party tried to unify the other splintered ML factions. The party organised a unity meeting with 13 ML factions to form a unified leading core. However, the initiative was a failure.

==== The IPF ====
In the early 1980s, the CPI(ML) Liberation began building an open non-party mass movement (directly following the original policy of CPI (ML)), the Indian People's Front (founded in April 1982). Nagbhushan Patnaik became the president of the IPF. The creating of the IPF, through which the underground party could develop links to other democratic forces on the basis of a popular, democratic and patriotic programme, was based on interventions by Mishra. However, although Mishra broke with the dogmas of the early CPI (ML), he never renounced Charu Majumdar's legacy.

In the third party congress, it was decided that IPF will participate in parliamentary elections. In 1989, IPF's Rameshwar Prasad won the loksabha seat from Ara (Bhojpur). In 1990, IPF won seven seats from Bihar Legislative Assembly. Special initiatives taken for restructuring the party and open up. IPF hold its first rally on 8 October 1990 in Delhi.

CPIML's mass base in the state of Bihar was among the members of Extremely Backward and Schedule Castes and it was initially unable to draw support for its activities from the upper backward castes. It was, however successful in mobilising the Koeris in the regions like Arrah, Rohtas, Patna and Aurangabad. This success remained temporary as with the formation of Rashtriya Janata Dal, the Koeri and Yadav support base of CPIML increasingly shifted its loyalty to the RJD. This was because plum posts in the party was offered by RJD to those defecting from the CPIML. During this period four legislators associated with Indian People's Front, the open mass organisation of CPIML defected to the RJD. These were Shri Bhagwan Singh Kushwaha, K.D Yadav, Umesh Singh and Suryadev Singh. However, the party was saved from complete ruin by the presence of top leadership which was ideologically committed and belonged to social groups such as non-Yadav Other Backward Castes.

==== The ASDC ====
In 1985, the party launched People's democratic Front (PDF) in Karbi Anglong district of Assam which won a seat in state assembly. In 1987 PDF was transformed to Autonomous State Demand Committee (ASDC). A sustained mass movement by ASDC help it to sweep district council elections in 1989. In 1981, ASDC's Jayanta Rongpi became an MP in Parliament. In 1996, ASDC was able to send its five-member group in Assam assembly as MLA.

In 1992, after the Fifth party congress (Held in Kolkata), the party comes out in the open from its underground status. Mishra was re-elected General Secretary of the party at the sixth congress of CPIML Liberation in Varanasi in October 1997.

== Present ==
The CPIML(Liberation), led by Dipankar Bhattacharya is a surviving faction of the CPIML. Liberation has established legal overground structures (trade unions, student groups, peasant organisations etc.) and participates in elections. In the Lok Sabha elections in 1999 the party won 0.3% of the votes and one seat (the former ASDC-seat from Assam). In the 2004 elections the seat was lost, mainly due to a split within ASDC. As of 2016, the party has been able to send its representatives to the state legislative assemblies of Bihar and Jharkhand as well as the panchayats of Bihar, Jharkhand, Uttar Pradesh, West Bengal, and Punjab.

In November 2020, it won 12 seats in Bihar's election. In 2025, it was reduced to 2 seats.

In 2024, it was able to win two seats in from Bihar in Indian general election. The CPIMLL candidates, Raja Ram Singh Kushwaha and Sudama Prasad were able to defeat union minister R. K. Singh in Arrah Lok Sabha constituency and Upendra Kushwaha and Bhojpuri singer and actor Pawan Singh in Karakat Lok Sabha constituency. In a report, Dainik Bhaskar stated that the party is more strong than Indian National Congress in the state of Bihar, given its stellar performance in 2020 Bihar Legislative Assembly elections and 2024 Indian general elections. Many a times, it was seen protesting against its own government outside and inside the house of legislative assembly. The party was also praised for its ground level work amongst the downtrodden section of society and for winning the elections with bare minimum resources, when other political parties relied on heavy funding from the corporate for their election expenses.

However the party suffered a setback in 2025, when it won just 2 seats in the 2025 Bihar Legislative Assembly election, suffering a loss of 10 seats.

CPIMLL has also showed significant presence in the regions such as Siwan and has been at the forefront in the fight against local landed magnates on the question of poor. It came into conflict with the gangster politician Mohammad Shahabuddin in the region, who was supported by local feudal elements. The Party has been served in the region by the influential local leaders such Ramesh Singh Kushwaha.

== Publications ==
The English-language publication of the party is Liberation, and thus the party is called CPIML Liberation. Apart from Liberation, the party publishes a central Hindi weekly organ, Samkaleen Lokyuddh. Some state party committees publish their own organs, like the weekly Ajker Deshabrati in West Bengal, Nabasphulinga in Tripura, Teeppori in Tamil Nadu, Telugu Liberation in Andhra Pradesh, Kannada Liberation in Karnataka, Samkali Lok Morcha in Punjab, etc.

== States ==
=== Bihar ===
The party has a longstanding conflict with the feudal landlords since the beginning of CPI (ML). Siwan, Bhojpur, Arrah are the strongholds of CPI (ML) movement. The communist movement in Bihar was founded by the comrade Jagdish Mahto, Rameshwar Ahir and Ramnaresh Ram in the Ekwaari village of Bhojpur. Traditionally, CPIML had a strong base between Kushwahas and Dalits of Bihar.

==== Bihar Legislative Assembly Election ====
2015

CPIML Liberation emerged as the fifth largest party in Bihar Legislative Assembly Election 2015. The party contested jointly along with CPI, CPI(M), RSP, Forward Bloc, and SUCI(C) as a third alternative to the National Democratic Alliance and the Mahagathbandhan of Lalu Prasad Yadav and Nitish Kumar. The party won the seats of Darauli, Balrampur and Tarari each. The party has a vote percentage of 1.5% in the state. All the left parties together have a vote percentage of 3.59%.

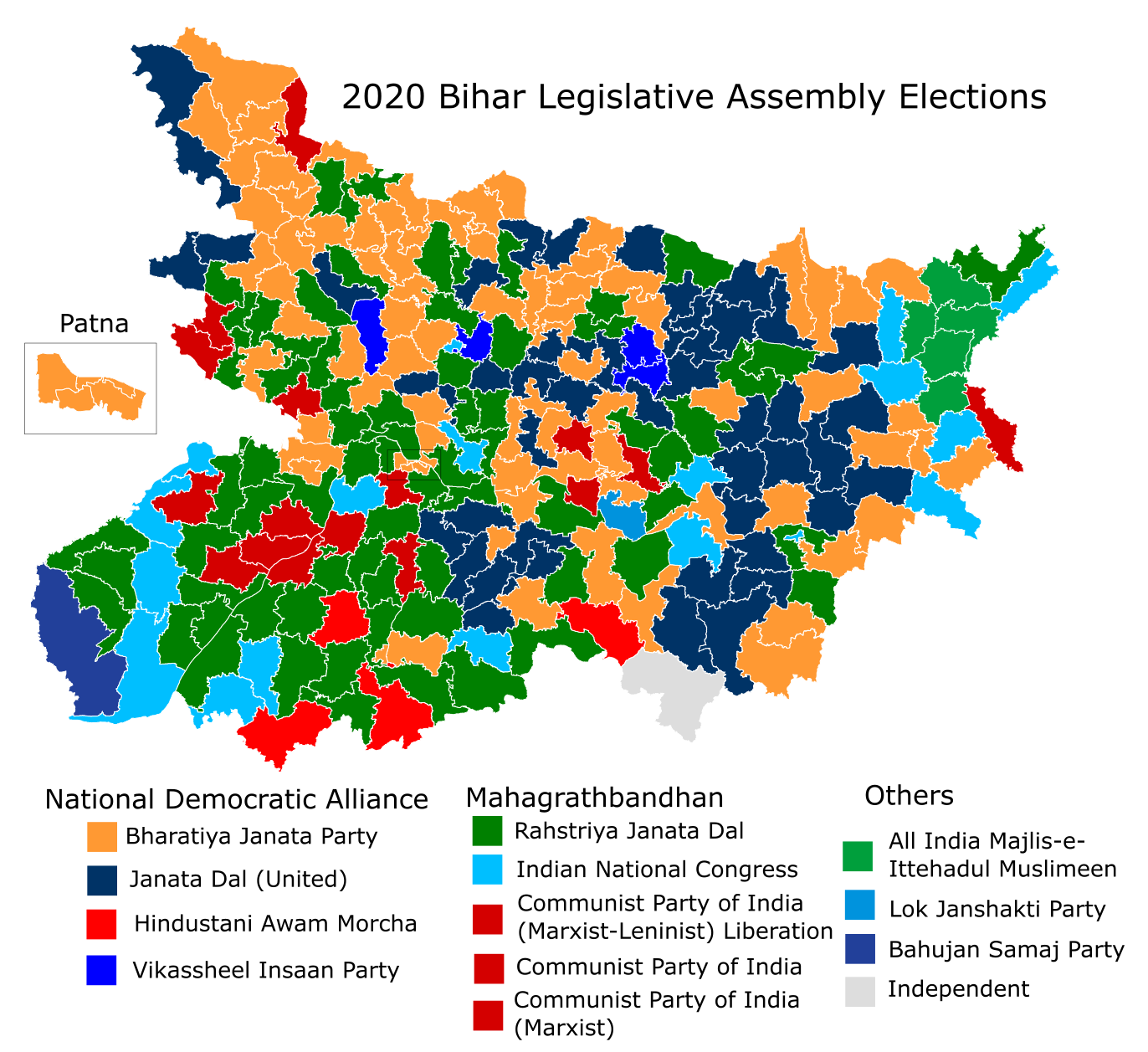
Map of results of 2020 Bihar assembly elections, grouped by party and alliance

2020

CPI(ML) Liberation contested the 2020 Bihar Legislative Assembly election as part of the Mahagathbandhan, an alliance of the UPA and the leftist parties led by the Rashtriya Janata Dal. The party secured 12 seats with a vote percentage of 3.16%, making it the fifth largest party in the Bihar Legislative Assembly. However, the Mahagathbandhan lost the election to the rival National Democratic Alliance.

As a result of the election, the CPI(ML)L was recognised as a state party by the Election Commission of India.

2025

In this election, contesting under the Mahagathbandhan, the party won just 2 seats and was the ninth largest party in Bihar Legislative Assembly. Its vote percentage reduced to 2.84%.

=== Jharkhand ===
Since the separation of Jharkhand from Bihar important places like Ranchi, Dhanbad, Giridih, Koderma, Jamtara and others have been field of work of the party. In Jharkhand the party is the representative of regional adivasis who have conflicts with corporates and government against improper land seizure without proper rehabilitation. The party also has conflicts with the local coal mafias.

Members of Legislative Assembly Jharkhand

Members of Jharkhand Legislative Assembly
5th Jharkhand Assembly
Year	Nos.	Name	Constituency	Votes
2024 Jharkhand Legislative Assembly election	1.	Bablu Mahato	Sindri	105,136
2024 Jharkhand Legislative Assembly election	2.	Arup Chatterjee	Nirsa	104,855

Giridih district, Jharkhand

=== 2014 state election ===
The party contested in cooperation with state left parties like Marxist Co-ordination Committee (MCC), CPI, and CPI(M) as an alternative to the BJP and INC led alliances. The party won the Dhanwar seat. The party got 1.5% of vote in the state. All the left parties together got 2.5% vote in the state.

=== 2019 state election ===
The party gained the legislative assembly seat of Bagodar but lost the previous seat from Dhanwar.

=== 2024 state election ===
In the 2024 Jharkhand Legislative Assembly election, the Marxist Co-ordination Committee (MCC), which since its inception was closely associated with the CPI(ML) Liberation, formally merged with the CPI(ML)L in September 2024.

Following the merger, CPI(ML)L held its first meeting on 10–11 September 2024, where five MCC leaders were inducted into its Central Committee.

As a result of the election, the CPI(ML)L gained the legislative assembly seats of Sindri and Nirsa.

== Leadership ==
The current general secretary of the party is Dipankar Bhattacharya, first elected in 1998 after the passing of Vinod Mishra. The 11th party congress of CPIML Liberation, held in Patna, Bihar from 15 to 20 February 2023 elected a Central Committee with 77 members. The Central Committee later elected a 17 numbers of Politburo members Committee.

=== Politburo members ===
No.	Name
1	Dipankar Bhattacharya
2	Swadesh Bhattacharya
3	Kartik Paul
4	Ramji Rai
5	Amar
6	Kunal
7	Dhirendra Jha
8	Janardan Prasad
9	Manoj Bhakt
10	Shankar V
11	Rajaram Singh
12	Vinod Singh
13	Meena Tiwari
14	Abhijit Mazumdar
15	Shashi Yadav
16	Sanjay Sharma
17	Ravi Rai

=== General Secretary ===
No.	Name	Tenure
1st	Subrata Dutta	1974–1975
2nd	Vinod Mishra	1975–1998
3rd	Dipankar Bhattacharya	1998–incumbent

== Electoral performance ==
Election Year	Overall votes	% of overall votes	seats contested	seats won	± in seats	± in vote share
Bihar Legislative Assembly
2015	587,701	1.54%	98	3 / 243	▲3	▼0.29
2020	1,333,682	3.16%	19	12 / 243	▲9	▲1.66
2025	1,425,592	2.84%	20	2 / 243	▼10	▼0.32
Jharkhand Legislative Assembly
2005		2.46%	28	1 / 81	Steady	Steady
2009	241,436	2.35%	33	1 / 81	Steady	▼0.11
2014	210,446	1.52%	39	1 / 81	Steady	▼0.83
2019	172,475	1.15%	14	1 / 81	Steady	▼0.35
2024	337,062	1.89%	4	2 / 81	▲1	▲0.74
Lok Sabha
2009	1,044,510	0.25%		0 / 543	Steady	Steady
2014	1,007,275	0.18%		0 / 543	Steady	▼0.7
2019	711,715	0.12%		0 / 543	Steady	▼0.6
2024	1,726,309	2.99%	4	2 / 543	▲2	▲2.87

== Members of Lok Sabha ==
Members of Lok Sabha
Year	Lok Sabha	Name	Constituency	Margin
1999 Indian general election	13th Lok Sabha	Jayanta Rongpi	Autonomous District Lok Sabha constituency	1,04,864
2024 Indian general election	18th Lok Sabha	Sudama Prasad	Arrah Lok Sabha constituency	59,808
2024 Indian general election	18th Lok Sabha	Raja Ram Singh Kushwaha	Karakat Lok Sabha constituency	1,05,858

== Members of Legislative Assembly Bihar ==
Members of Bihar Legislative Assembly
17th Bihar Assembly
Year	Nos.	Name	Constituency	Margin
2020 Bihar Legislative Assembly election	1.	Birendra Prasad Gupta	Sikta	2,302
2020 Bihar Legislative Assembly election	2.	Mahbub Alam	Balrampur	53,597
2020 Bihar Legislative Assembly election	3.	Amarjeet Kushwaha	Ziradei	
2020 Bihar Legislative Assembly election	4.	Satyadeo Ram	Darauli	12,119
2020 Bihar Legislative Assembly election	5.	Gopal Ravidas	Phulwari	13,857
2020 Bihar Legislative Assembly election	6.	Sandeep Saurav	Paliganj	30,915
2020 Bihar Legislative Assembly election	7.		Agiaon	48,550
2020 Bihar Legislative Assembly election	8.	Shiv Prakash Ranjan	Agiaon	29,835
2020 Bihar Legislative Assembly election	8.	2024 By-election	Agiaon	29,835
2020 Bihar Legislative Assembly election	9.		Tarari	11,015
2020 Bihar Legislative Assembly election	10.		Tarari	
2020 Bihar Legislative Assembly election	10.	2024 By-election	Tarari	
2020 Bihar Legislative Assembly election	11.	Ajit Kushwaha	Dumraon	
2020 Bihar Legislative Assembly election	12.		Karakat	
2020 Bihar Legislative Assembly election	13.	Maha Nand Singh	Arwal	
2020 Bihar Legislative Assembly election	14.		Ghosi	

Member of Bihar Legislative Assembly
16th Bihar Assembly
Year	Nos.	Name	Constituency	Margin
2015 Bihar Legislative Assembly election	1.	Satyadeo Ram	Darauli	
2015 Bihar Legislative Assembly election	2.	Mahbub Alam	Balrampur	20,419
2015 Bihar Legislative Assembly election	6.			

Member of Bihar Legislative Assembly
14th bihar Assembly
Year	Nos.	Name	Constituency	Margin
October 2005 Bihar Legislative Assembly election	1.	Amar Nath Yadav	Darauli	
October 2005 Bihar Legislative Assembly election	2.	Mahbub Alam		
October 2005 Bihar Legislative Assembly election	3.		Karakat	
October 2005 Bihar Legislative Assembly election	4.			
October 2005 Bihar Legislative Assembly election	5.			

== Mass organizations ==
The main mass organizations of the party are:

- Revolutionary Youth Association (RYA)
- All India Students Association (AISA)
- All India Agricultural and Rural Labour Association (AIARLA)
- All India Peasants' Coordination Committee
- All India Central Council of Trade Unions (AICCTU)
- All India Progressive Women's Association (AIPWA)
- Autonomous State Demand Committee (ASDC)
- All India Kisan Mahasabha (AIKM)

== See also ==
- List of political parties in India
