= Tarimul =

- Village
- Location in Odisha, India Tarimul (India)
- Coordinates: 21.1644°N 86.0673°E
- Country: India
- State: Odisha
- District: Kendujhar
- Elevation: 50 m (160 ft)

Population (2011)
  - Total: 1,998

Languages
  - Official: Odia
- Time zone: UTC+5:30 (IST)
- PIN: 758025
- Vehicle registration: OR-09
- Website: www.tarimul.co.in

Tarimul is a small village on the banks of Sendhei River in the Kendujhar District of Orissa, India. It lies at a distance of 12 km. from Anandapur, 90 km. from the district headquarters Kendujhar and 160 km. from Bhubaneswar, the state capital.

It is a village within the Ghasipura Block of Anandapur Subdivision. The people of the village are Hindus. Most of the people are farmers, a few work in Government and Private sectors. The majority of youths in the village are engaged in various types of businesses.

The neighbourhood villages are Deogaon, Bhandaridiha, Rekutia, Kantarohi, Tulaasipura, Kochianandi, Kesadurapal, Narangpur, Basantpura, Khaliamenta, Bangarakota, Khalana.
