= Bholanuagaon =

- Village
- Location in Orissa, India
- Coordinates: 21.2172°N 86.0733°E
- Country: India
- State: Odisha
- District: Kendujhar
- Elevation: 80 m (260 ft)

Languages
  - Official: Oriya
- Time zone: UTC+5:30 (IST)
- PIN: 758015
- Telephone code: 06731
- Vehicle registration: OR-09

Bholanuagaon is a small village in the Kendujhar District of Orissa, India. It lies at a distance of 8 km. from Anandapur, 85 km. from the district headquarters 'Kendujhar' and 165 km. from Bhubaneswar, the state capital.

It is a village within the Ghasipura Block of Anandapur Subdivision. The people of the village are Hindus. The primary occupation of people is cultivation. However, many villagers are highly qualified and are placed in higher government and private organizations. Some people also depend upon various types of businesses.

Thi neighbourhood villages are Sailong to the east, Khaliamenta to the west.
