= Kainipura =

- Village
- Location in Odisha, India
- Coordinates: 21.2066°N 86.0926°E
- Country: India
- State: Odisha
- District: Kendujhar
- Elevation: 60 m (200 ft)

Languages
  - Official: Odia
- Time zone: UTC+5:30 (IST)
- PIN: 758015
- Telephone code: 06731
- Vehicle registration: OD-09

Kainipura is a small village in the Kendujhar District of Odisha, India, within the Ghasipura block of Anandapur subdivision. It lies at a distance of 5 km (3.1 mi) from Anandapur, 80 km (50 mi) from the district headquarters Kendujhar and 160 km (99 mi) from Bhubaneswar, the state capital.

The people of the village are Hindus. Most of the population depend on various types of business, while the rest work in farming, government and private sectors.

The neighbourhood villages are Sailong to the north, Chaumuhin to the south-west and Ghasipura to the north-east.

== Places of interest ==
=== Kalpeshwar Temple ===
It is a temple of Lord Shiva, located at the beginning of the village. The specialty of this temple is that it has been stood on a pond. Shiva Ratri is grandly celebrated in this village. All the villagers come to the temple for "Darshan" everyday especially on Monday and offer their obeisances to Lord Mahadev regardless any caste. Every evening of Monday the villagers, congregate at the Temple and do Hari Nama Sankirtan with a prayer to make the World peaceful.

=== Shri Aurobindo Ashram ===
A memorial of Sri Aurobindo containing his relics. Various devotional activities are conducted throughout the year.
