= Belabahali =

Village in Odisha

Coordinates: 21.164033°N 86.128124°E

Belabahali is a village located in Anandapur Block of Kendujhar district in Odisha. The PIN Code of Belabahali is 758020.
