= Sailong =

- Village
- Location in Odisha, India Sailong (India)
- Coordinates: 21.217°N 86.089°E
- Country: India
- State: Odisha
- District: Kendujhar
- Elevation: 70 m (230 ft)

Languages
  - Official: Oriya
- Time zone: UTC+5:30 (IST)
- PIN: 758015
- Telephone code: 06731
- Vehicle registration: OR-09
- Website: odisha.gov.in

Sailong is a small village in the Kendujhar District of Odisha, India. It lies at a distance of 5 km. from Anandapur, 80 km. from the district headquarters 'Kendujhar' and 160 km. from Bhubaneswar, the state capital.

It is a village within the Ghasipura Block of Anandapur Subdivision. It comes under the Anandapur Municipality which is one of the three Municipalities of the district. The people of the village are Hindus. Most of the people are farmers, a few work in government and private sectors. The major part of the youth in the village are engaged in various types of businesses.

Thi neighbourhood villages are Kainipura to the south, Bholanuagaon and Khaliamenta to the west, Ghasipura to the east. National Highway 215 (NH-215) passes through this village.

== Places of interest ==
The village is located at the base of Mankadakenda Hill with a maximum height of 540 ft, which represents a Dyke of Igneous Intrusion (Geologically). The rocks of this hill are mostly Granites and Dolerites. The presence of this hill gives the village an excellent scenic appearance.

=== Baya Baba Matha ===
This is a Hindu Matha located on the top of Mankadakenda Hill. It consists of three temples, i.e. Lord Jagannath and Goddess Maa Vanadurga and Lord Shiva (Omkareshwara). The founder of this Matha was Baya Baba, a saint at his time. He was practising meditation within a cave in the same hill which is another interesting part of the Matha. The cave was supposed to be a man made structure. A couple of natural open caves are also present in the vicinity. The most celebrating festival of this matha is Basanti Durga puja. Many devotees are came to here in the occasion of Basanti Durga Puja.

Surrounded by giant blocks of Granite and natural forest, this place bears a unique importance in the whole Anandapur Subdivision. Hundreds of devotees visit this place everyday and have discussion with the current sage of the Math. This place is also a beautiful picnic spot. In the months of December to February many people come here for picnic.

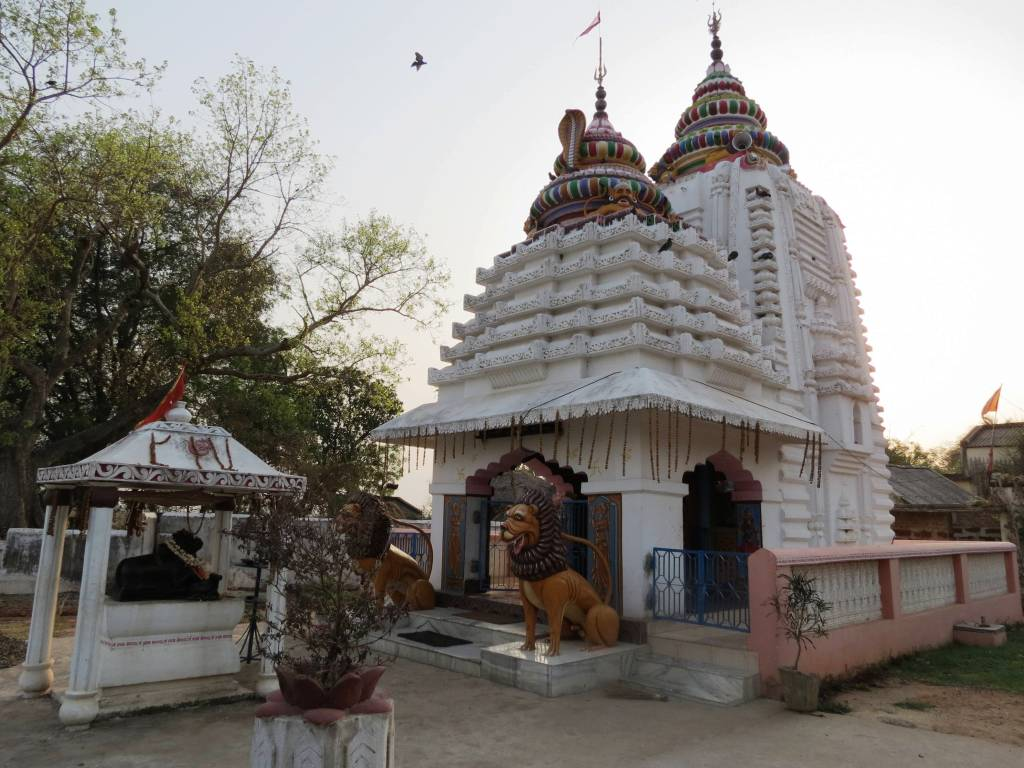
Shaileshwar Siva Temple

=== Hanuman Temple ===
This is the temple of Lord Hanuman, the greatest devotee of Lord Rama of all times. This is located within the village near the Pala mandap, which is a pandal on which religious discussions and debates in the form of songs of a special type (Called Pala) among experts from different parts of Odisha being held every year. Different festivals related to Lord Rama and Lord Hanuman are celebrated in this temple.

=== Shiva Temple ===
This temple lies in the middle of the village. This is the temple of Lord Shiva, the embodiment of simplicity and renunciation. And celebrated different festivals like Jagar and Sheetal sasti. This temple opens up every morning and all the rituals are taking place till 12 in the afternoon and then it is closed till the evening.

=== Festivals ===
The village celebrates Raja festival, kumara purnima, khudurukuni osa, etc. During the Raja Festival an opera is arranged by the villagers.
