= Kathiasara =

- Coordinates: 21°12′30″N 86°12′33″E

Kathiasara is a village arranged in Anandapur square of Kendujhar in the Indian state of Odisha.

== Demographics ==
According to the 2011 census 2011 up to 54 families dwell there. The population is 205 out of which 108 are male and 97 are female. The average sex ratio is .898.

The number of children age 0–6 years is 17, 8% of the aggregate populace. 9 are male and 8 are female.

According to the 2011 census, the literacy rate of Kathiasara is 89.9%, higher proficiency than the 58.4% of Kendujhar region. The male proficiency rate is 94.95% and the female proficiency rate is 84.27%.

== Geography ==
A canal runs on the north side of and a small waterway additionally runs on the south side. A major pond sits among the mango cultivate.

== Religion ==
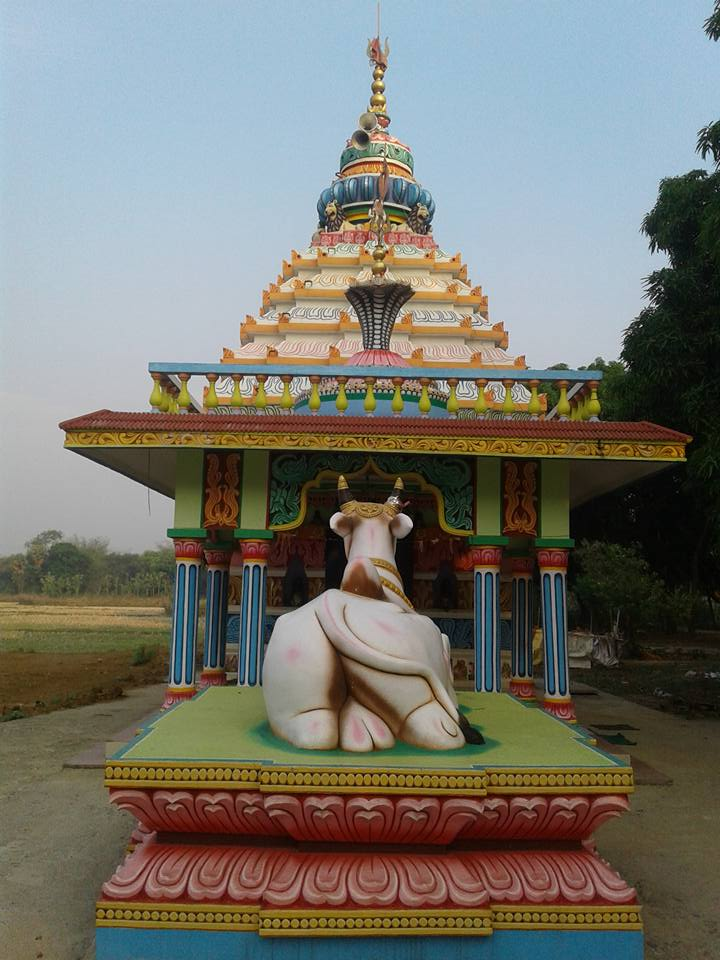
Kathiasara Lord Siva Temple

To the east are temples such as Lord Siva Temple and Lord Hanuman Temple. Another Temple Maa Mangala is in the town.

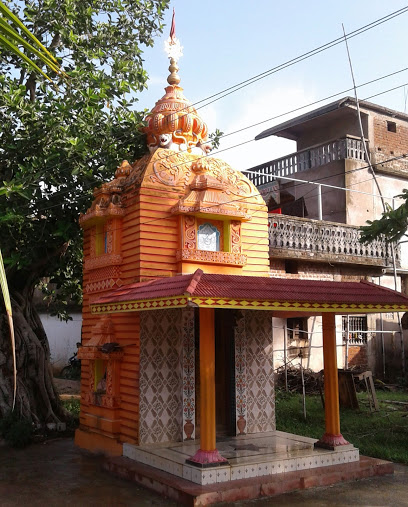
Kathiasara Maa Mangala Temple

The school is named Kathiasara Primary School in the east side of the town which is close to the Mango Garden. Kathiasara has an Anganwadi Kendra on the east side between the Mango fields.
