= Khalana =

- Village
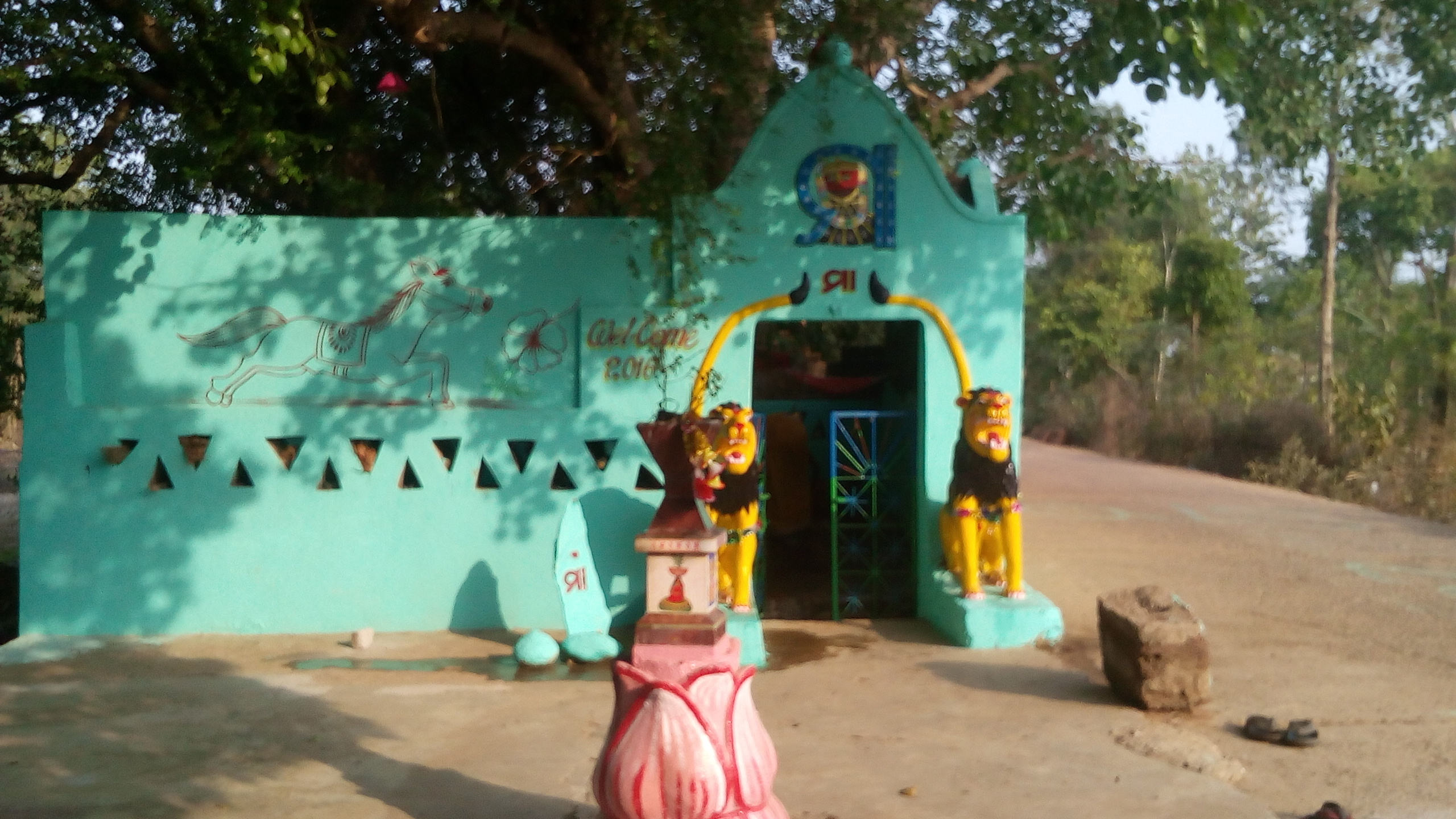
- Khalana Tarini Sala

- Location in Odisha, India Khalana (India)
- Coordinates: 21.10629°N 86.08118°E
- Country: India
- States: Odisha
- District: Kendujhar
- Subdivision: Anandapur
- Block: Ghasipura
- Police station: Ramachandrapur
- Gram panchayat: Khalana

Government
  - Type: Panchayati raj
  - Body: Gram panchayat
  - Sarpanch: (BJD)
  - Samit Sabhya: Nalini Jena (BJD)
- Elevation: 68 m (223 ft)

Population (2018)
  - Total: 8,500
- Demonym: Khalania

Languages
  - official: Odia
- Time zone: UTC+5:30 (IST)
- PIN: 758043
- Vehicle registration: OD-09

Khalana is a village in Kendujhar district in the Indian state of Odisha.

== Geography ==
It is situated 3 kilometres from NH 20 and 12 kilometres from Anandapur and 95 kilometres from Kendujhar. Khalana is a panchayat village within Ghasipura Block of Anandapur Subdivision.

Nearby villages are Sainkul, Agarda Lunahara, Nuagaon and Suanpada.

== Economy ==
The primary occupation is agriculture. Business is the fastest growing area. Younger people are migrating to find better jobs. A few provide government services as teachers, chartered accountants and scientists.

== Administration ==
Khalana Village is administrated by Khalana Gram panchayat. Khalana gram panchayat includes two villages; Agarda and Khalana Khalana Village has been divided into some Sahi's They are

- Chhotipada Sahi (୧.ଛୋଟିପଡା ସାହି)
- Bandha Sahi (୨.ବନ୍ଧ ସାହି)
- Matihudi Sahi (୩.ମାଟିହୁଡ଼ି ସାହି)
- Balidanda Sahi (୪.ବାଲିଦାଣ୍ଡ ସାହି)
- Patana Sahi (୫.ପାଟଣା ସାହି)
- Majhi Sahi (୬.ମାଝି ସାହି)
- Gouda Sahi (୭.ଗଉଡ଼ ସାହି)
- Behera Sahi (୮.ବେହେରା ସାହି)
- Majhi Sahi (୯.ମଝି ସାହି)
- Gadia Sahi (୧୦.ଗଡ଼ିଆ ସାହି)
- Tala Sahi (୧୧.ତଳ ସାହି)

== Education ==
Khalana Village has two primary schools and one high school to improve its education. The schools are

- Khalana UGUP School (ଖଲଣା ମଧ୍ୟ ଇଂରାଜୀ ବିଦ୍ୟାଳୟ)
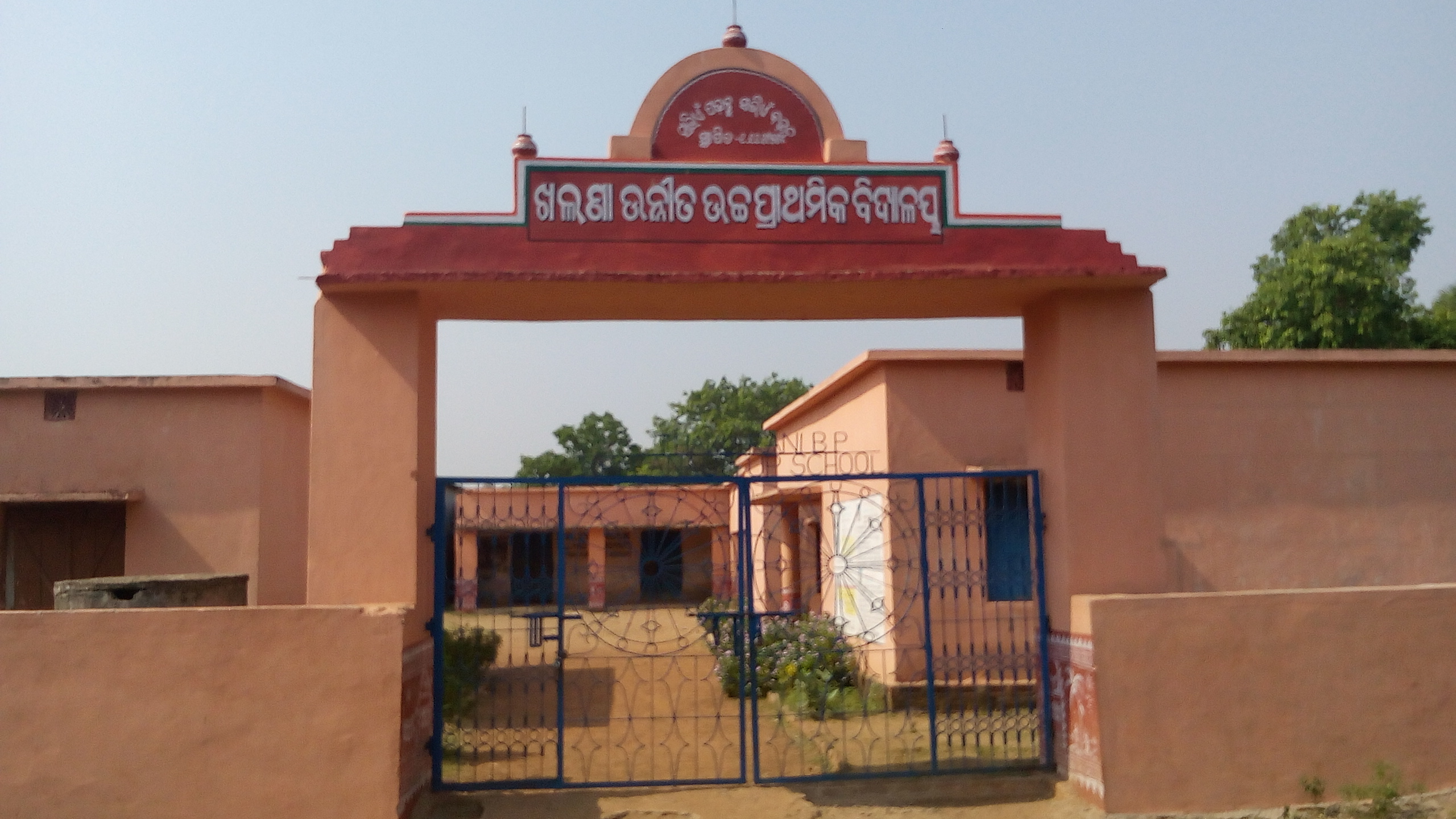
  Khalana U.G.U.P School
- Tala Sahi Primary School (ତଳସାହି ପ୍ରାଥମିକ ବିଦ୍ୟାଳୟ,ଖଲଣା.)
- Thakurani Bidyapitha, Khalana (ଠାକୁରାଣୀ ବିଦ୍ୟାପୀଠ,ଖଲଣା)
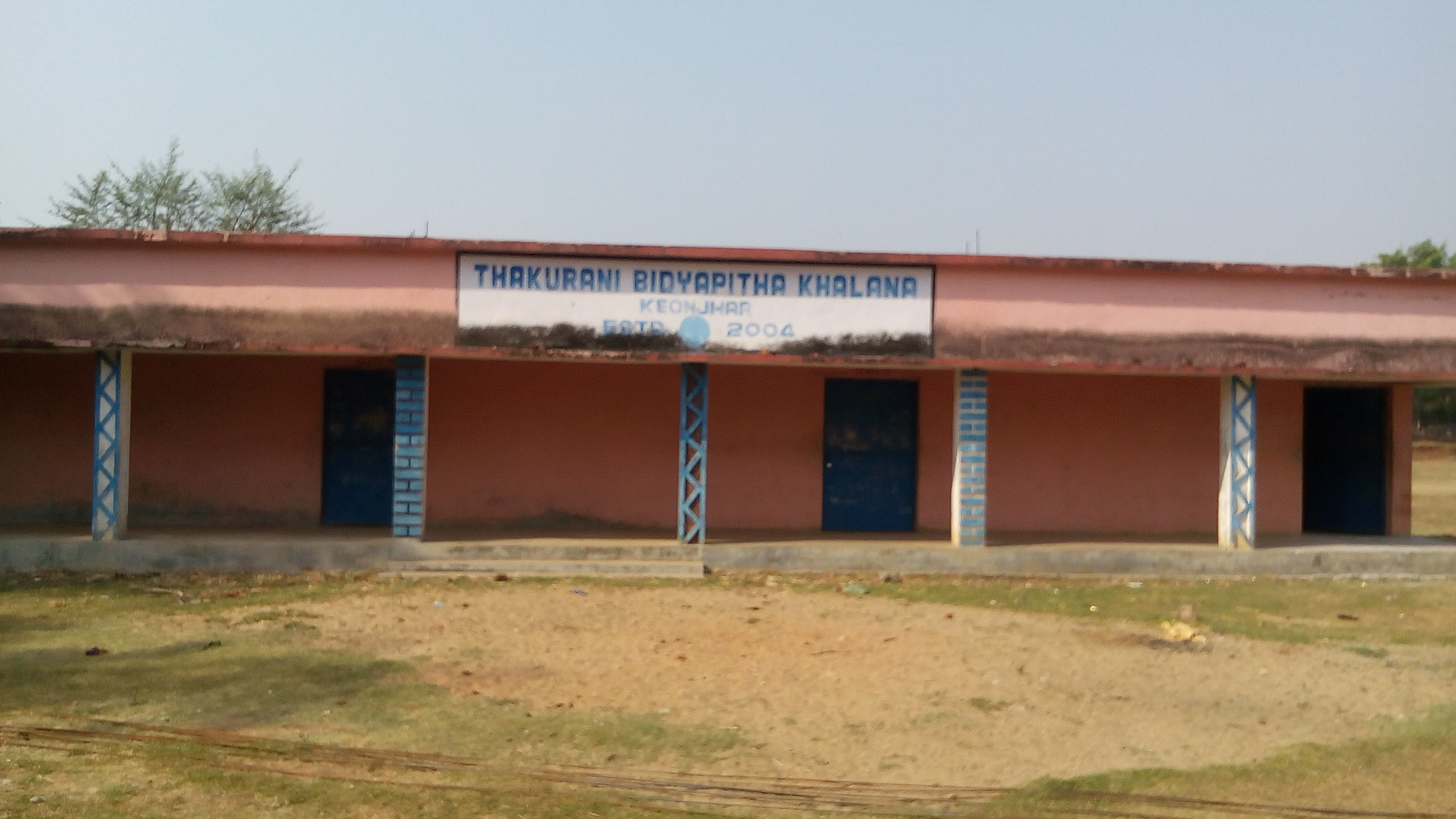
  Thakurani Bidyapitha, Khalana
  .
- Saraswati Shisu Mandira (ସରସ୍ୱତୀ ଶିଶୁ ବିଦ୍ୟା ମନ୍ଦିର,ଖଲଣା)
- St Xavier's High school

=== Religion and Culture ===
Pana Sankranti (ପଣା ସଂକ୍ରାନ୍ତି) is the major local festival of the village and among other things, this festival is famous for chaiti parba (ଚଇତି ପର୍ବ).

Other local festivals include: Raja, Holi, Ratha-Yatra, Rama Nabami Janmastami, Lakshmi Puja, Nila Madhab and Narayan Medha.

=== Holy places ===
- Bada Gadia pond

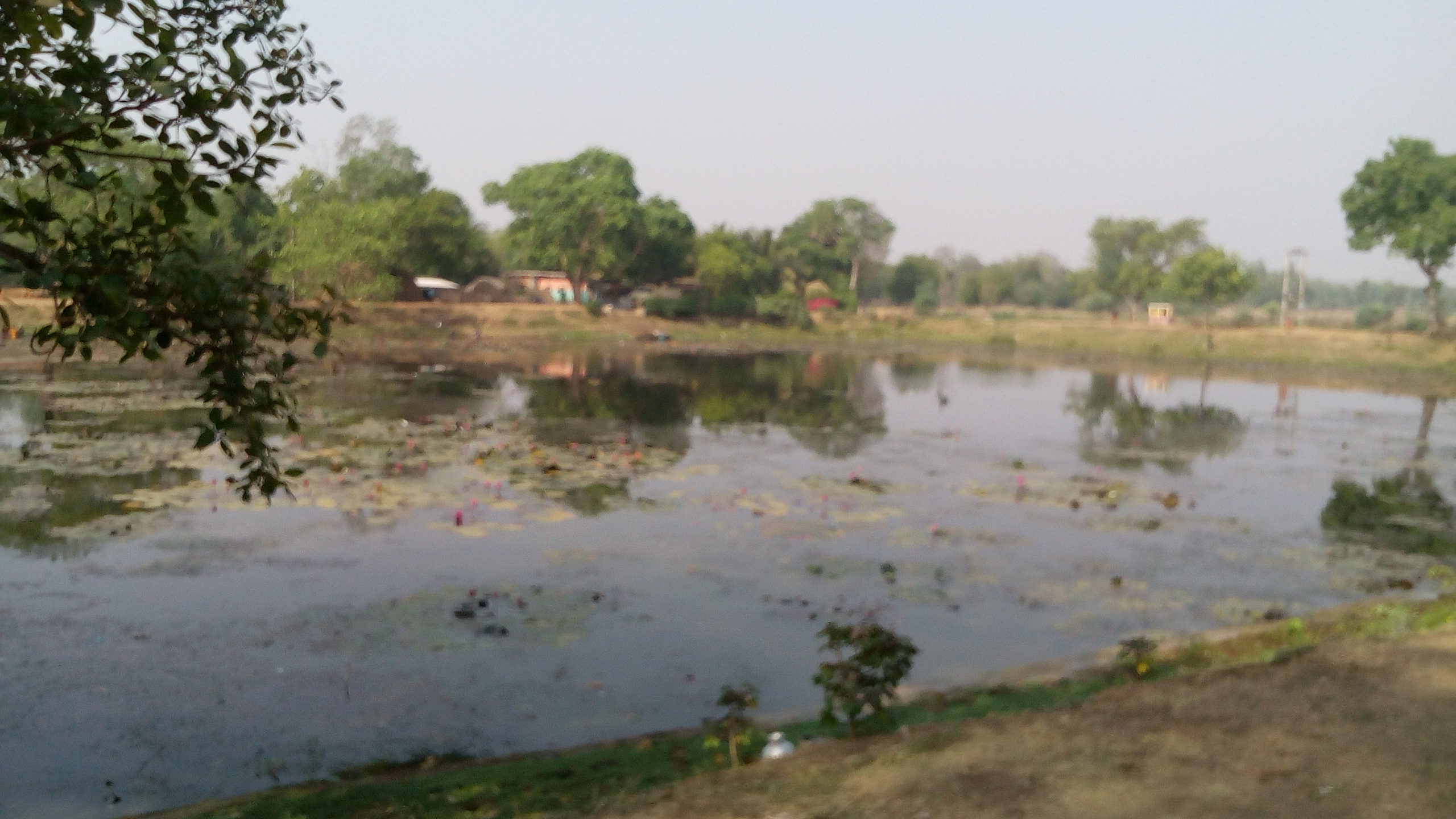
Bada Gadia, Khalana

- Kuni Baba Matha (Hindu monastery) 10 temples are built there.

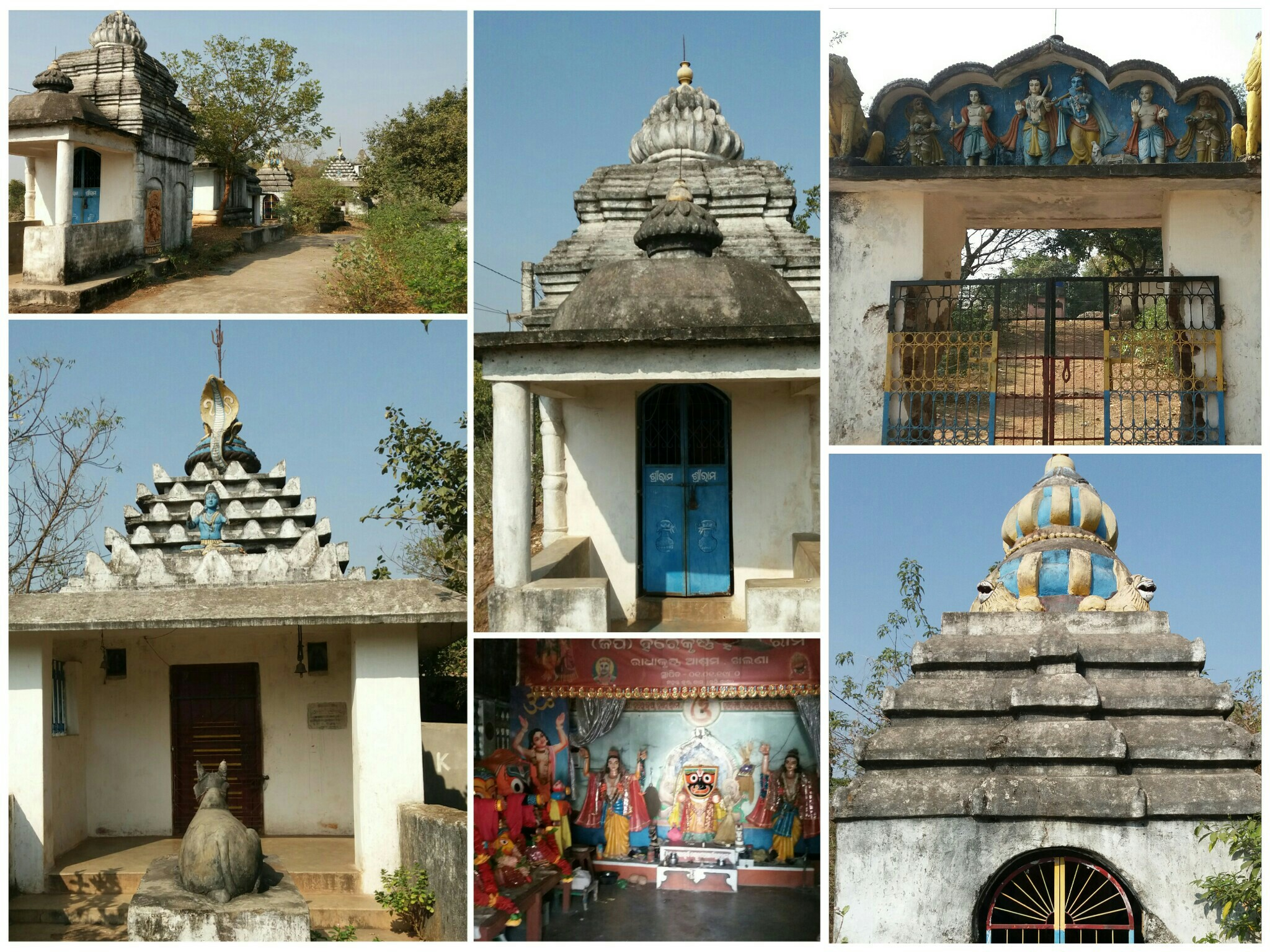

- Hanuman Statue–statue of Lord Hanuman near Patana Gadia

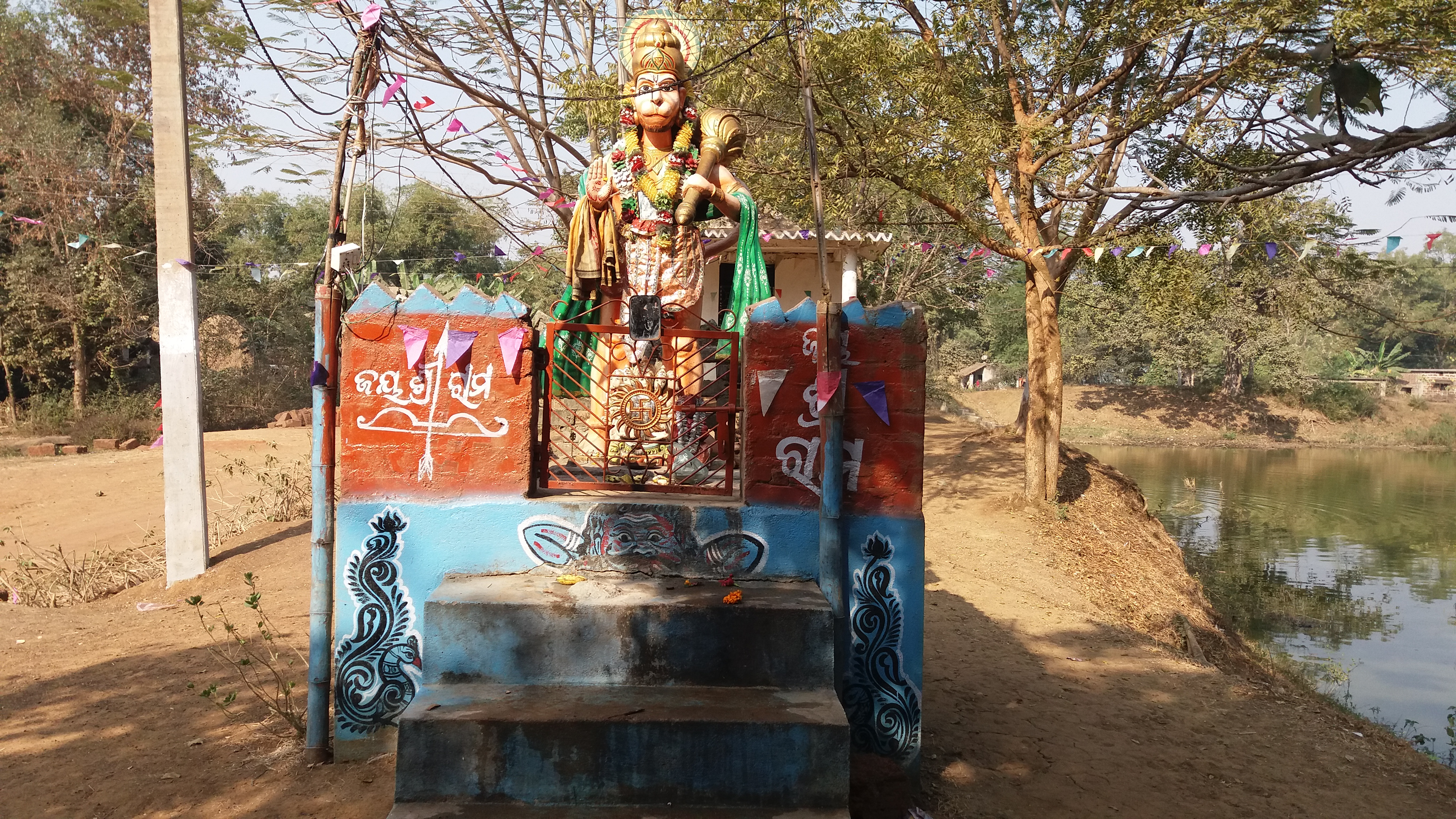
