= Deogaon =

- Village
- Location in Orissa, India
- Coordinates: 21.1641°N 86.0674°E
- Country: India
- State: Odisha
- District: Kendujhar
- Elevation: 50 m (160 ft)

Languages
  - Official: Odia
- Time zone: UTC+5:30 (IST)
- PIN: 758025
- Vehicle registration: OR-09/OD-09

Deogaon is a small village on the banks of Kusei River in the Kendujhar District of Orissa, India. It lies at a distance of 10 km from Anandapur, 90 km from the district headquarters Kendujhar and 170 km from Bhubaneswar, the state capital.

It is a village within the Ghasipura Block of Anandapur Subdivision. The people of the village are Hindus. Most of the people are farmers, a few work in Government and Private sectors. The majority of youths in the village are engaged in various types of businesses.

The neighbourhood villages are Bangarakota, Tarimul, Kesadurapal among others.

== Places of interest ==
The village is located on the banks of the Kusei River. It has a unique place in the culture of the Kendujhar district. In the past it was a flourishing seat of Buddhism. A 5 feet (1.5 m) high image of Abalokiteswar stands there as a reminiscence of the Buddhism in the past.

=== Kushaleshwar Temple ===
The temple of Kushaleswar built in 900 CE is a famous centre of pilgrimage. It is one of the holiest shrine of Lord Shiva in the district. On the occasion of Maha Shivaratri a large fair is organized at this place that lasts for more than half a month. Devotees from all over the state come to worship in the temple.

=== Pathara Bandha ===
It is one of the most important monuments of the place. It is a stone embankment on the river Kusei which is the second of its kind in the state; the first being the embankment on the river Kathajodi at Cuttack.
