= Bhopal Tablighi Ijtema =

Annual Islamic congregation in Bhopal, India

- Native name: بھوپال تبلیغی اجتماع
- Date: 1949
- Venue: Aalmi Tabligi Ijtima Ground, Molvi Ganj, Islam Nagar, Bhopal, Berasiya Rd, Madhya Pradesh 462038
- Location: Bhopal, Ghasipura since 1946
- Also known as: Bhopal Ijtema; بھوپال اجتماع
- Cause: For the Enlightenment of Muslims and to spread the message of peace
- Organised by: Tablighi Jamaat and other associated muslim organisations and madarsas
- Current Chairman: Iqbal Hafeez Khan

Bhopal Tablighi Ijtema is an annual Islamic Ijtema (congregation) or Aalmi Ijtema held in Bhopal, India.

The first ijtema was organised in 1949 at Masjid Shakoor Khan in Bhopal's old walled city. After the event grew, the venue was changed to Taj-ul-Masajid. Since 2005 because of the heavy crowd the venue has been shifted to Ghasipura, 11 km from Bhopal.

== Activities ==
Ijtema is held on a Saturday, Sunday and Monday every year in November Jamaats gather from around the world. From 2018 Ijtema is held on Friday, Saturday, Sunday and Monday, Increased a day. The congregation begins with Fajr salah on Friday morning followed by a series of lectures from different Muslim scholars and clerics. A break is given after dhuhr namaz. The programme continues all weekend and concludes with final prayers on Monday afternoon. Mass marriages also takes place on Saturday and Sunday.

Scholars speak on a variety of subjects including the Islamic way of life and the Six Principles. After the final prayer, Jamaats are formed which then travel around the world to preach about Islam. About a million people gather for Final prayers and half a million stay on Ijtema ground during the three days. People from different societies come here to listen to peace talks and to learn about Islam.

The government of Madhya Pradesh provides electricity, water supply and security along with parking places for the convenience of Jamaats. Jamaats from different parts of the world as far as from west also attend this congregation. Translators for people from foreign countries, and translators for deaf and dumb are also provided by Ijtema committee.

== Chairman ==
TIC Bhopal chairman Iqbal Hafeez Khan has requested the planned maintenance work at platform no 1 be postponed to 5 December. In the alternative, it should be completed by next month, so as to avoid inconvenience to lakhs of devotees arriving here to attend the 69th Aalmi Tablighi Ijtema (International Islamic Congregation).

The annual Ijtema will be held at Bhopal from 18 to 21 November. Chief minister Shivraj Singh Chouhan has directed to ensure all the necessary arrangements before commencement of Ijtema.

== See also ==
- Bishwa Ijtema, itjema held in Tongi, Bangladesh
- Tablighi Jamaat
