= Taj-ul-Masajid =

Mosque in Bhopal, Madhya Pradesh, India

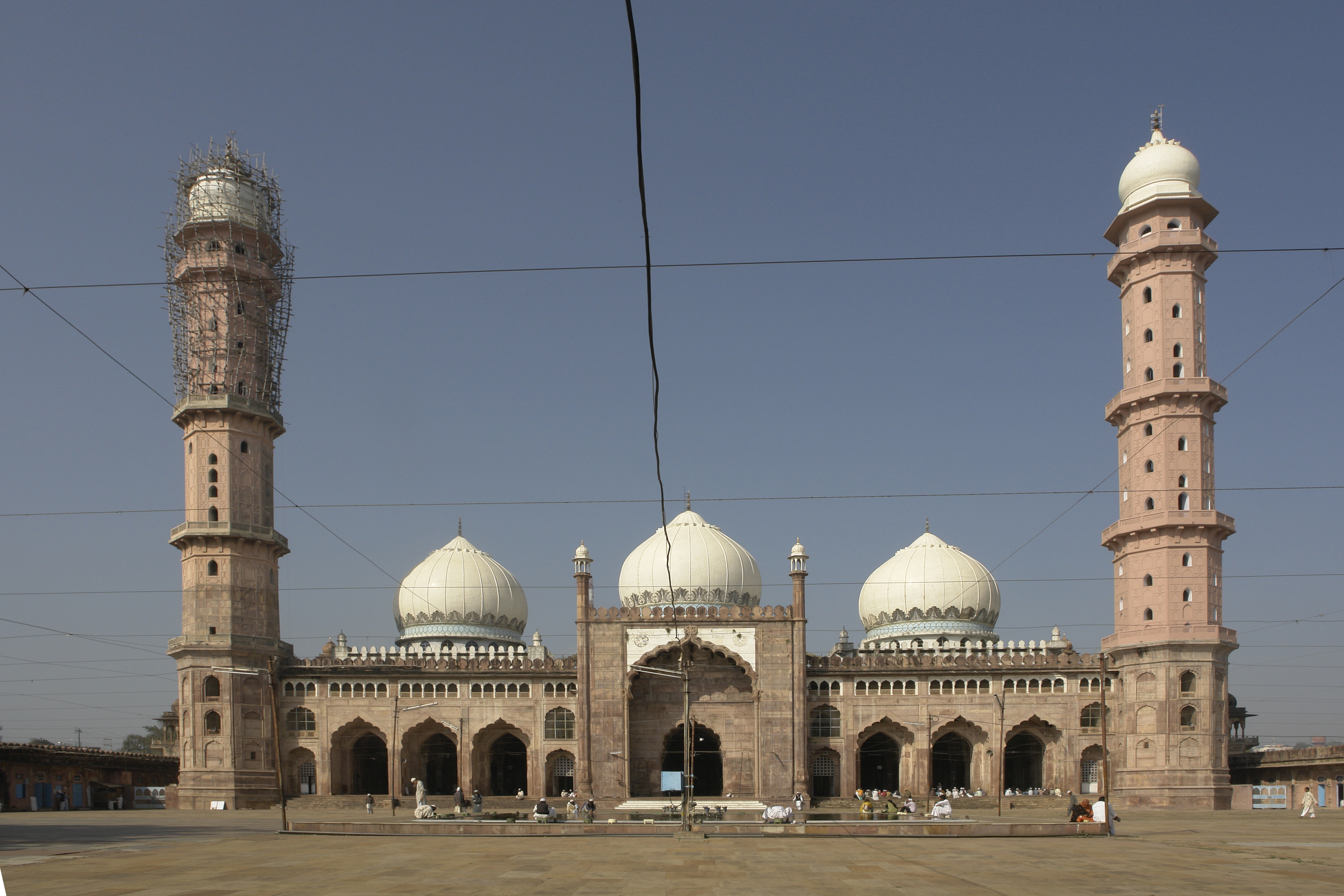
- The mosque in 2010

- Location of the mosque and dargah in Madhya Pradesh

Religion
- Affiliation: Sunni Islam
- Rite: Deobandi movement (Tablighi Jamaat)
- Ecclesiastical or organizational status: Mosque
- Status: Active

Location
- Location: Bhopal, Madhya Pradesh
- Country: India
- Interactive map of Taj-ul-Masajid
- Coordinates: 23°15′47″N 77°23′35″E

Architecture
- Type: Mosque architecture
- Style: Indo-Islamic Architecture
- Funded by: Shah Jahan Begum; Sultan Jahan Begum
- Established: c. 1870s (as a congregation)
- Groundbreaking: 1887
- Completed: 1958

Specifications
- Capacity: c. 26,000 worshippers
- Interior area: 13,000 m^{2} (140,000 sq ft)
- Dome: Three
- Minaret: Two
- Minaret height: 67 m (220 ft)

Website
- darululoomtajulmasajid.in

The Taj-ul-Masajid (Arabic: تَاجُ ٱلْمَسَاجِد, romanized: Tāj-ul-Masājid, lit. 'Crown of Mosques'), also known as the Tāj-ul-Masjid (Arabic: تَاجُ ٱلْمَسْجِد), is a Sunni mosque, affiliated with Tablighi Jamaat, part of the Deobandi movement, located in Bhopal, in the state of Madhya Pradesh, India. With capacity for c. 26,000 worshippers, it is the largest mosque in India and, as of 2014, was the ninth largest mosque in the world.

== History ==
The construction of the Taj-ul-Masajid was started by Nawab Shah Jahan Begum of Bhopal, in the newly built walled suburb of Shahjahanabad. The exact year when construction was started is unclear; estimated it to be 1871. The Bhopal-based journalist and the author of Masajid-e-Bhopal (transl. The Mosques in Bhopal), Aarif Aziz stated the date as 1887.

After Shah Jahan Begum died in 1901, the mosque continued to be built by her daughter, Sultan Jahan Begum, till the end of her lifetime. The structure was planned in the midst of three water bodies, namely: Munshi Hussain Talab; Noor Mahal Talab; and Motia Talab. Hamidullah Khan helped construct one gate of the mosque on the suggestions of Shah Jahan Begum.

The construction work was later led by Islamic scholar Imran Khan Nadwi, whose brother Salman Khan Nadwi, supervised the constructions. The construction was complete by 1958 at an expenditure of 20 million Indian rupees. The entrance of the mosque was renovated with motifs from 13th century Syrian mosques donated by the Emir of Kuwait in memory of his late wife.

During the COVID-19 pandemic, the mosque was used as a vaccination center.

== Architecture ==
The Taj-ul-Masajid largely takes inspiration from Mughal architecture. The mosque has a pink facade topped by two 18-storey high octagonal minarets with marble domes, an impressive main hallway with attractive pillars, and marble flooring resembling the likes of Jama Masjid in Delhi and the Badshahi Mosque of Lahore. It has a courtyard with a large ablution tank in the centre. It has a double-storeyed gateway with four recessed archways and nine cusped multifold openings in the main prayer hall. The massive pillars in the hall hold 27 ceilings through squinted arches of which 16 ceilings are decorated with ornate petalled designs.

The mosque also features a zenana, rare given that prayer from home was the norm for women at the time of the mosque's construction.

== Annual congregation ==
Bhopal Tablighi Ijtema, an annual three-day congregation of the Tablighi Jamaat was hosted in the Taj-ul-Masajid between 1948 and 2001. It was shifted to Intkhedi. outside the city due to shortage of space.

== Gallery ==
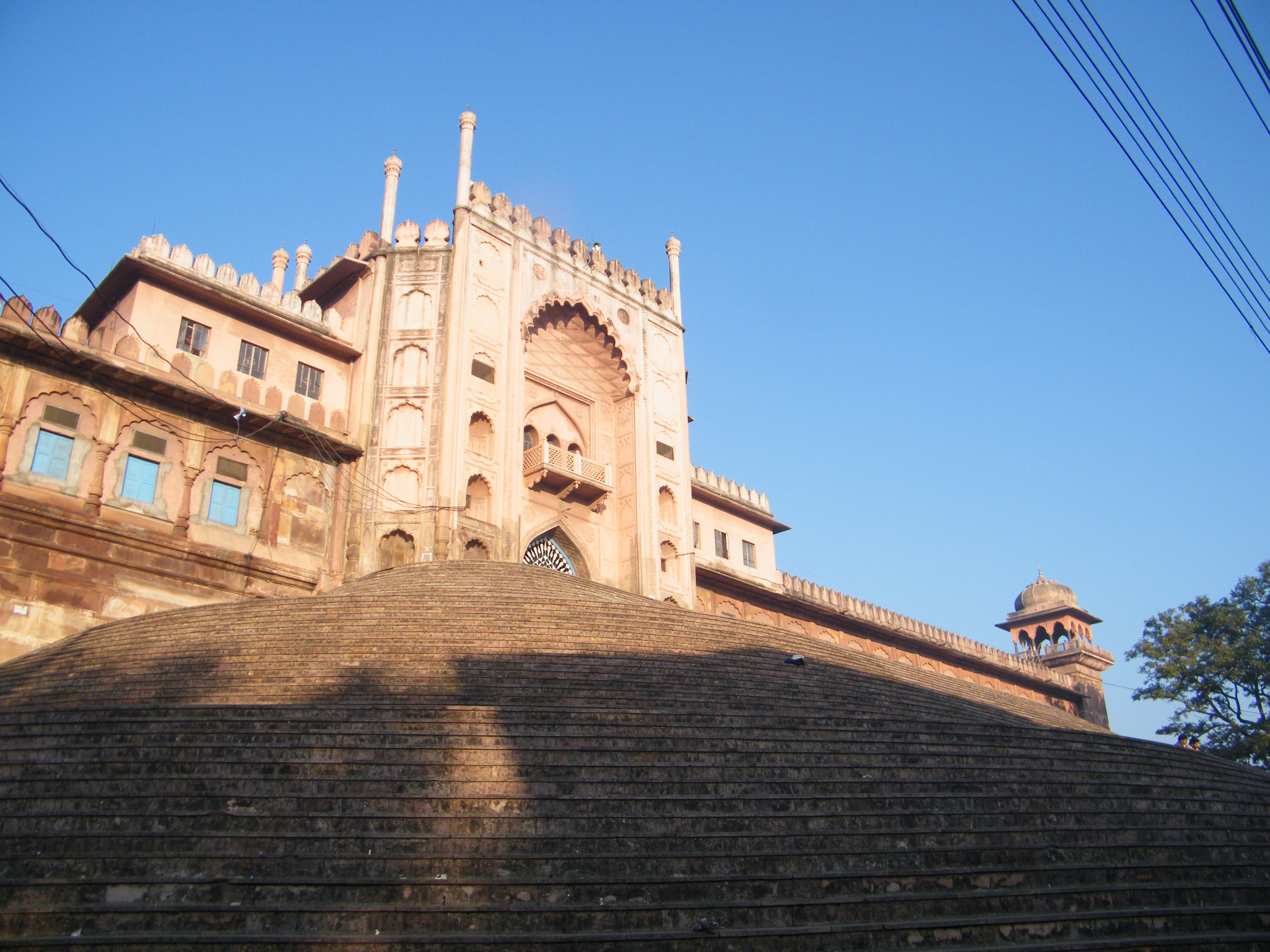
The mosque gate

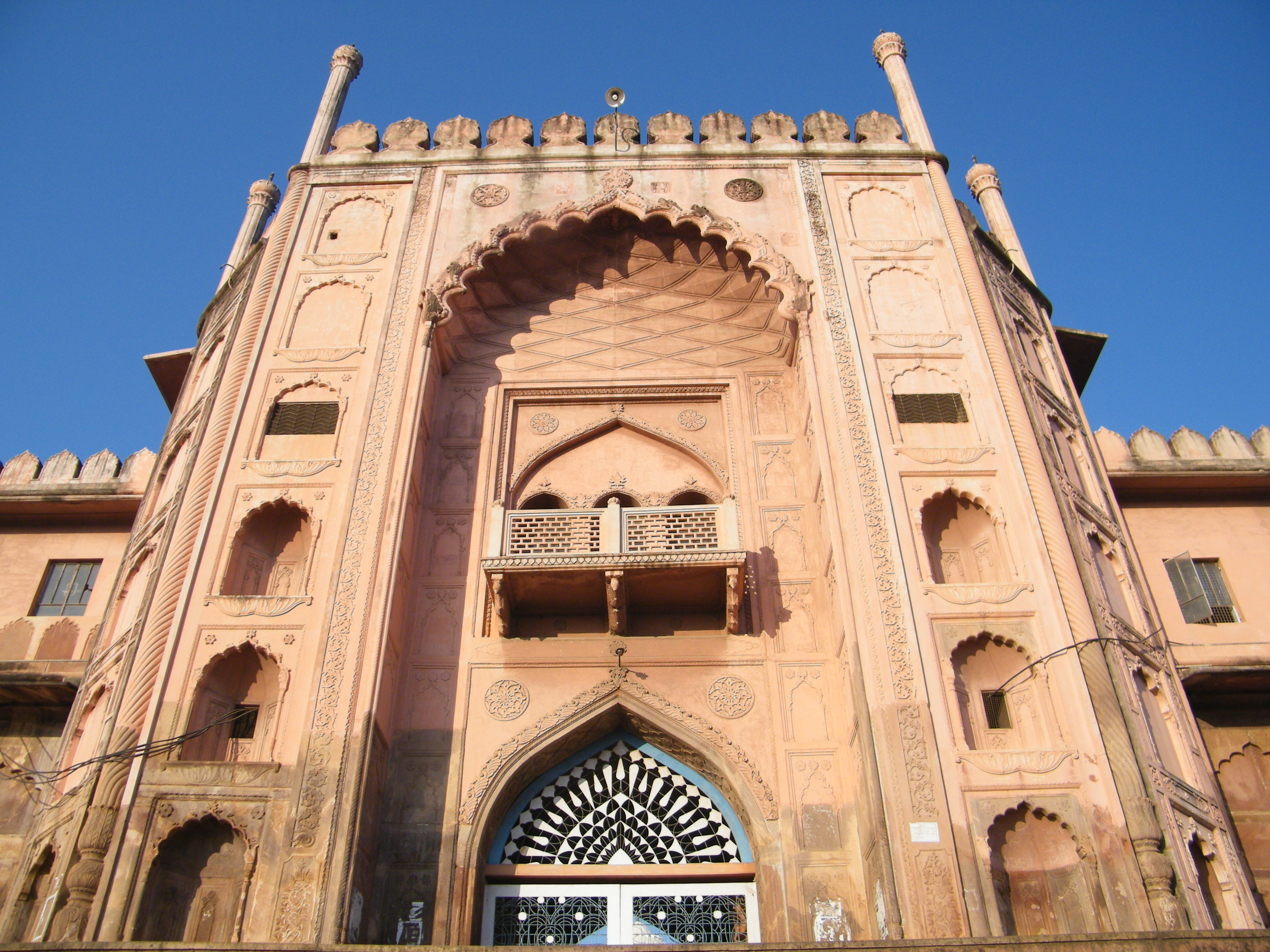
Entrance gate of the mosque

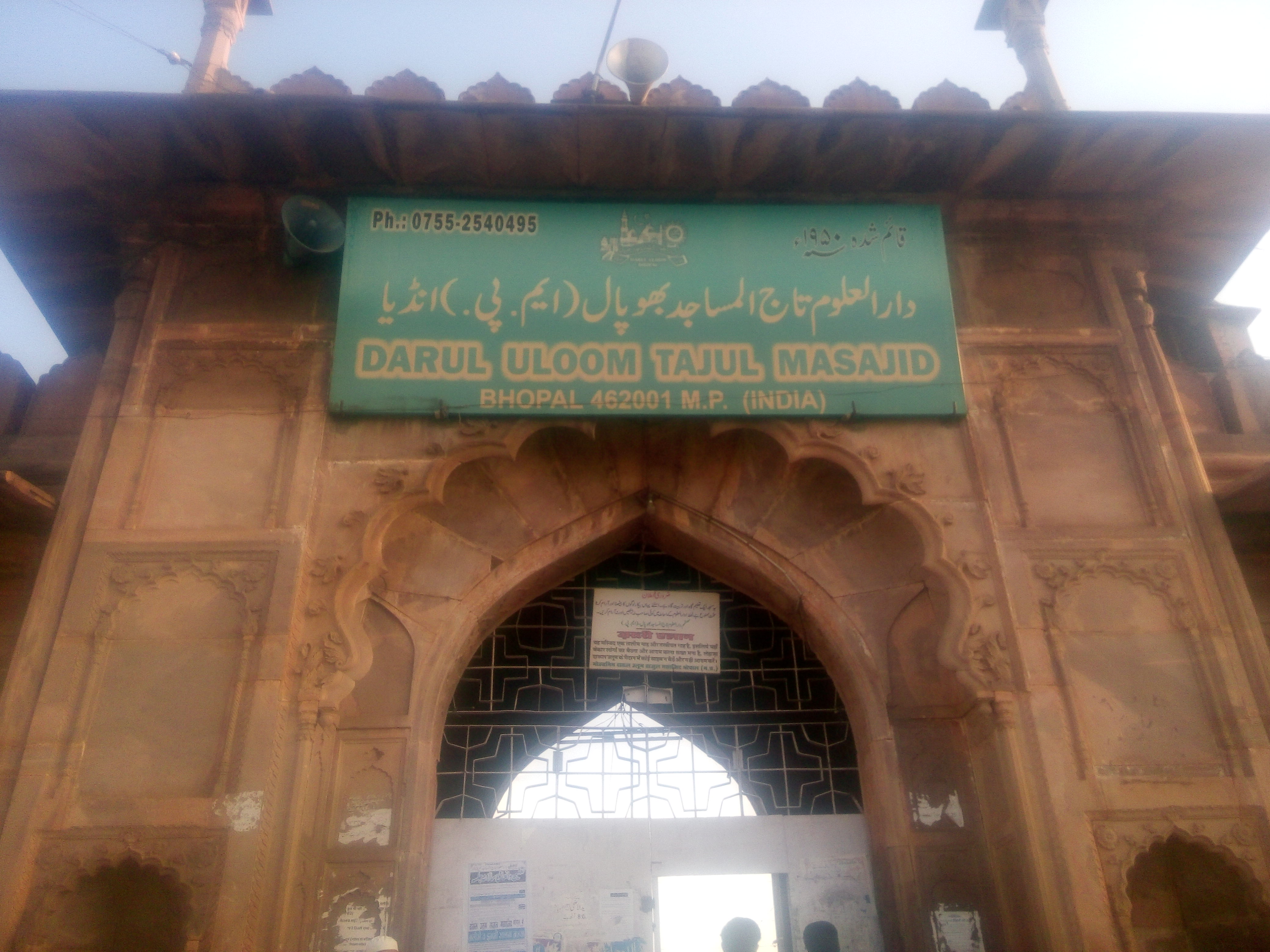
Exterior of the mosque

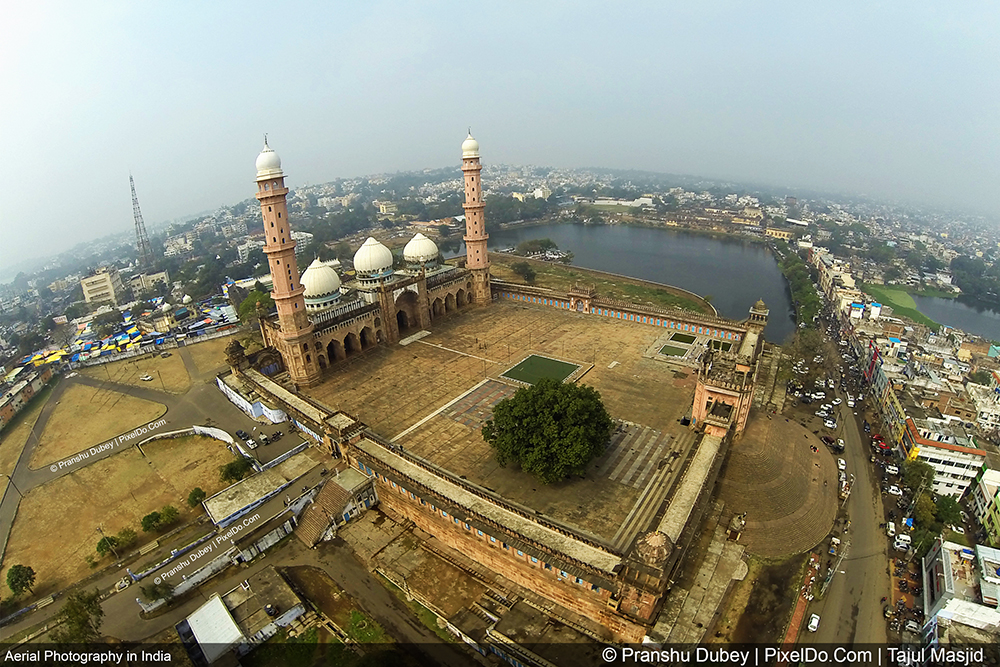
An aerial photo of the mosque

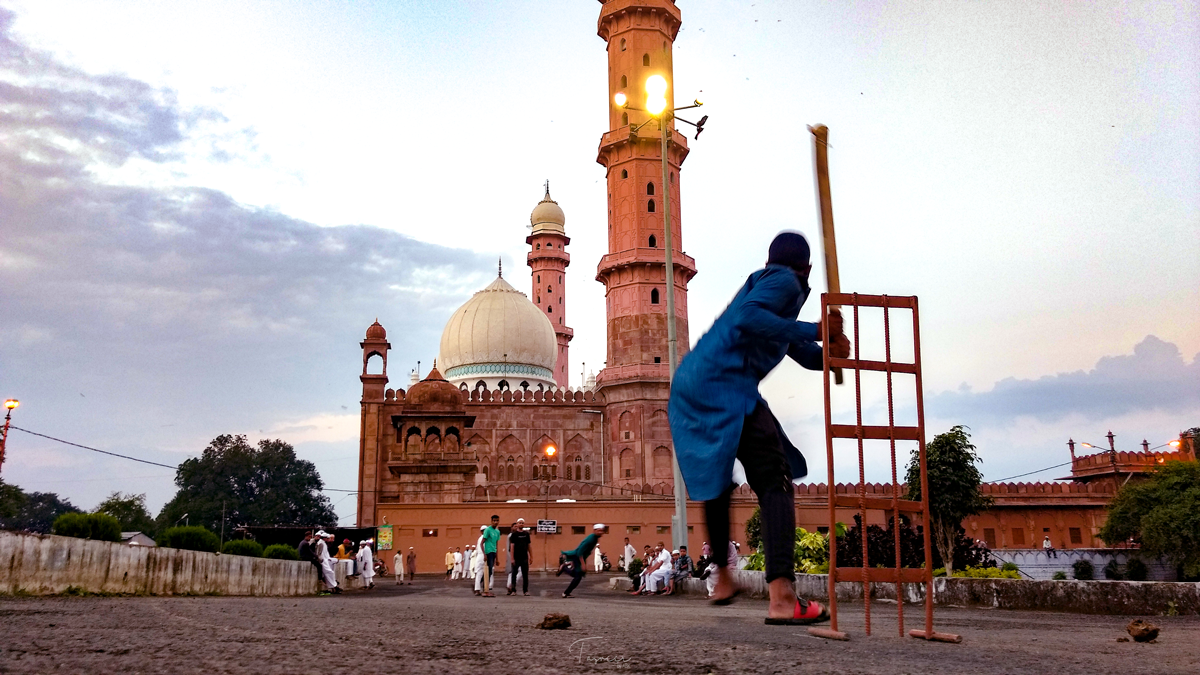
The mosque grounds

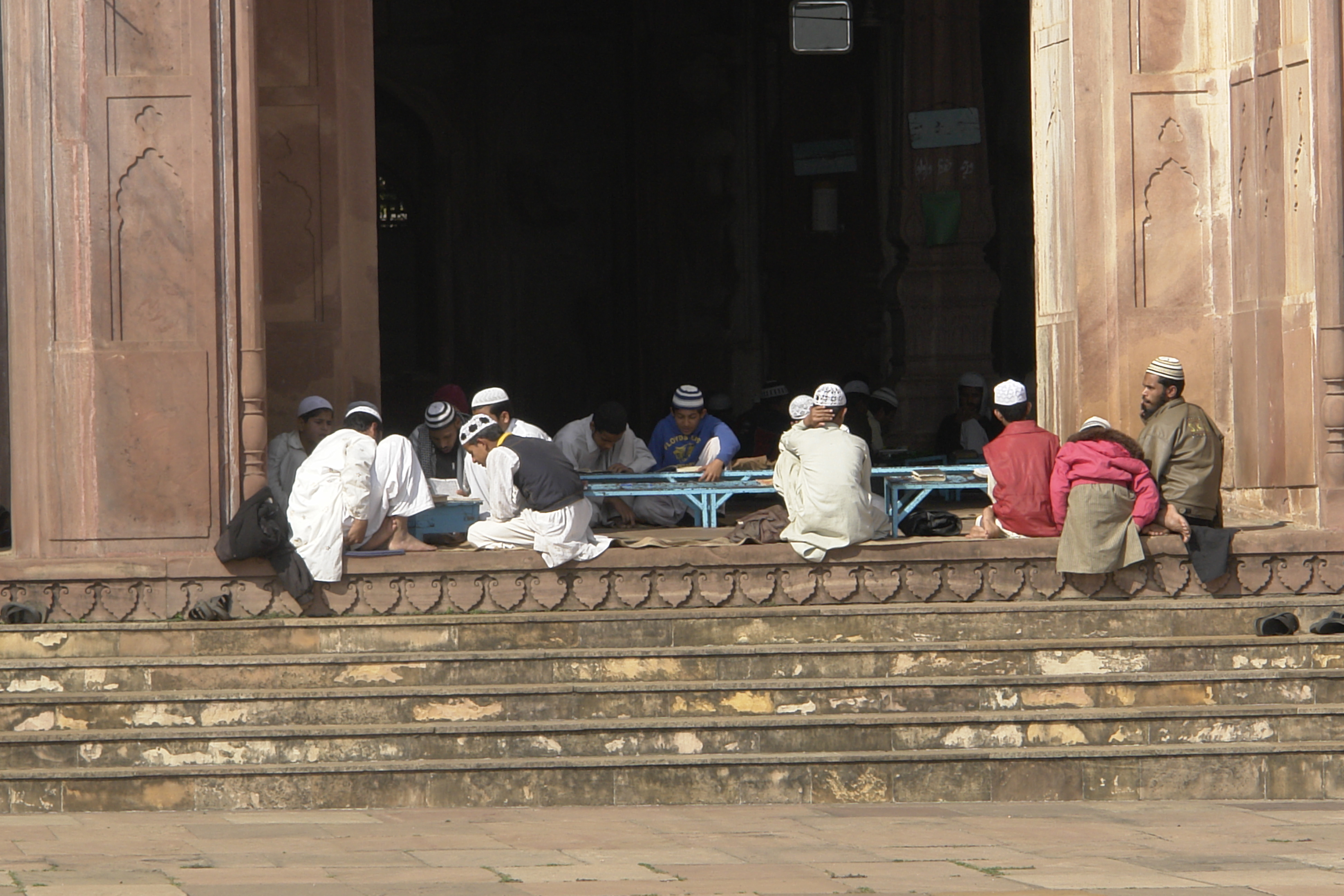
Madrasa in the mosque

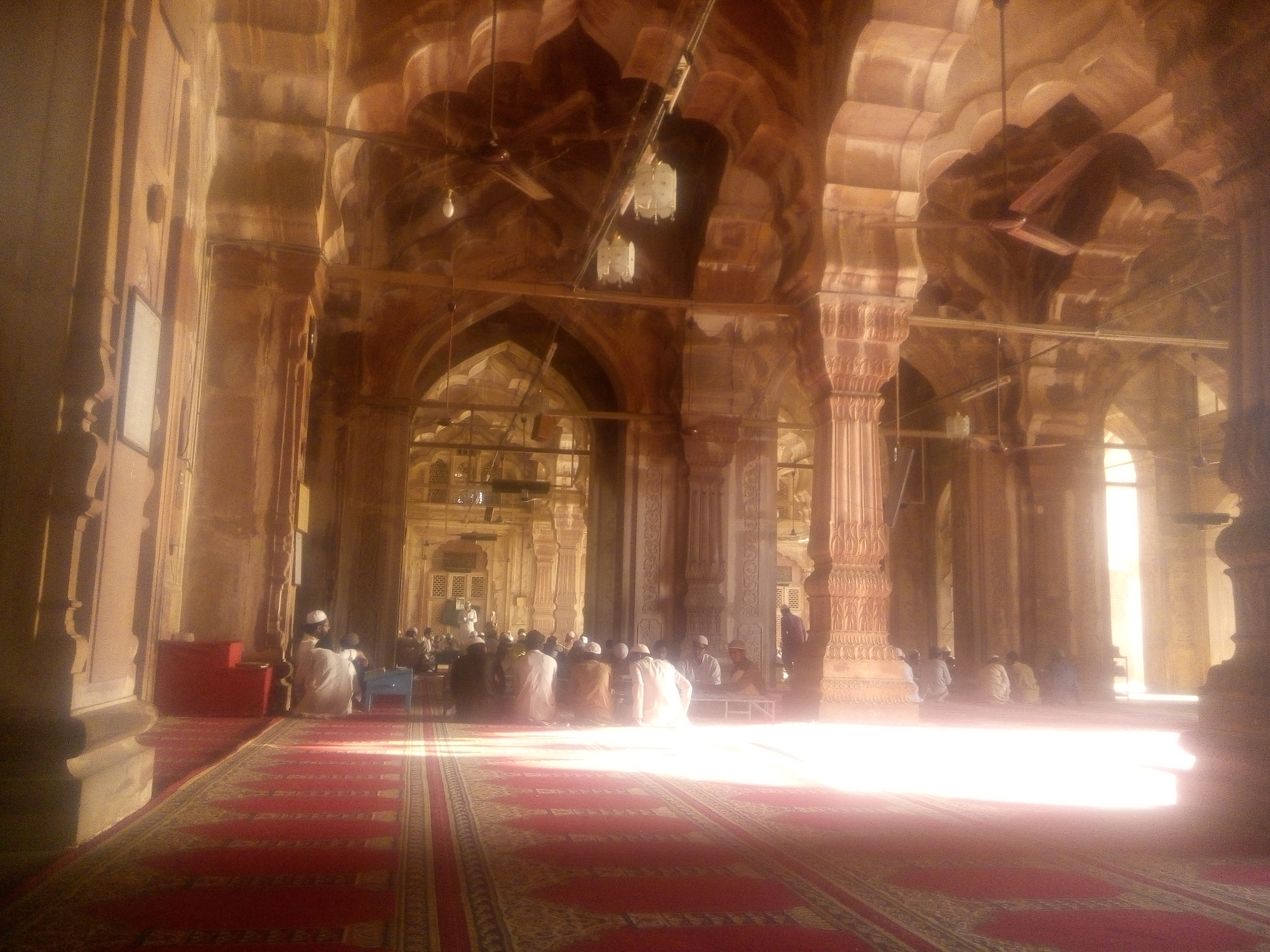
Madrasa in the mosque

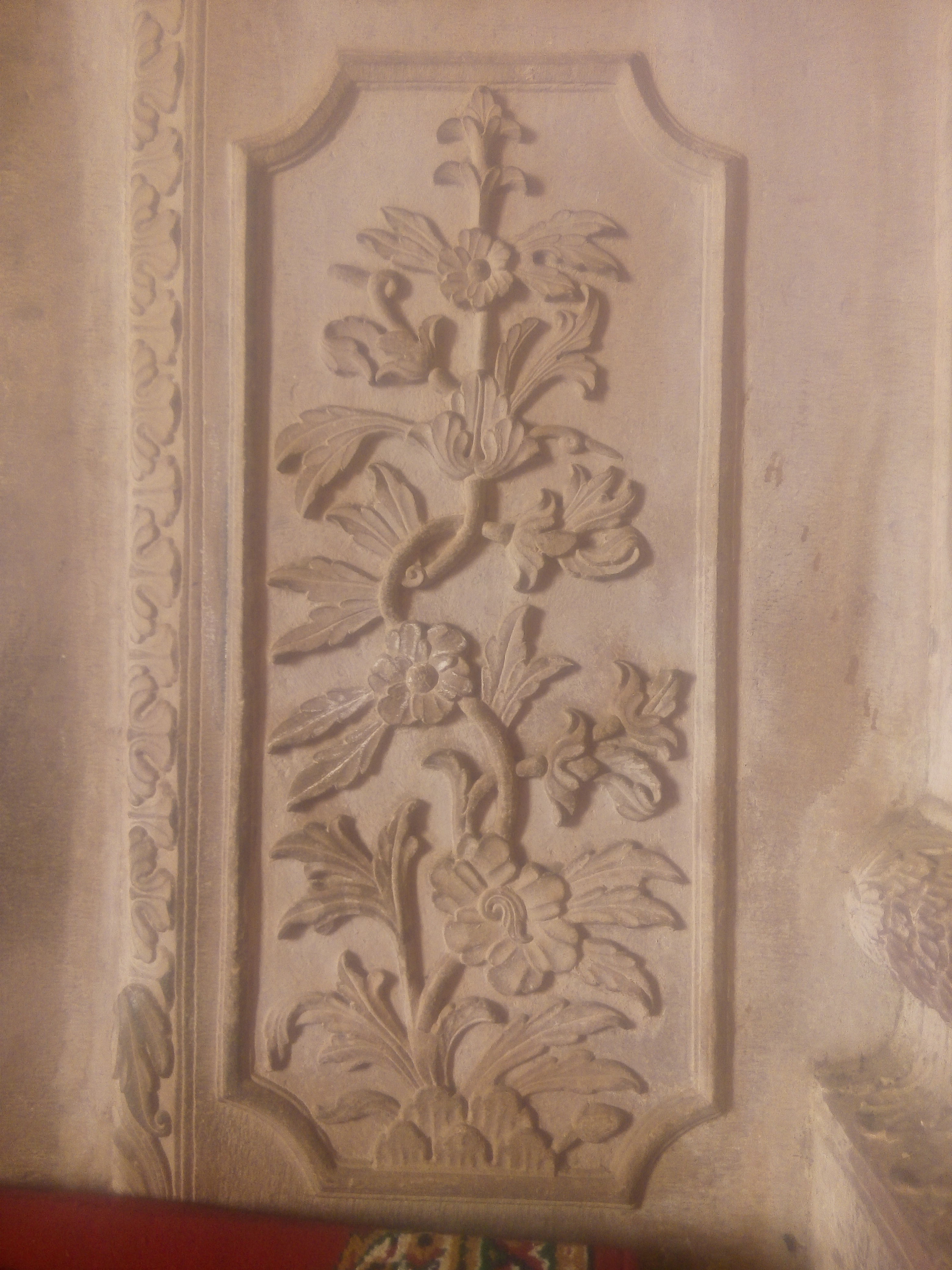
Carvings on wall

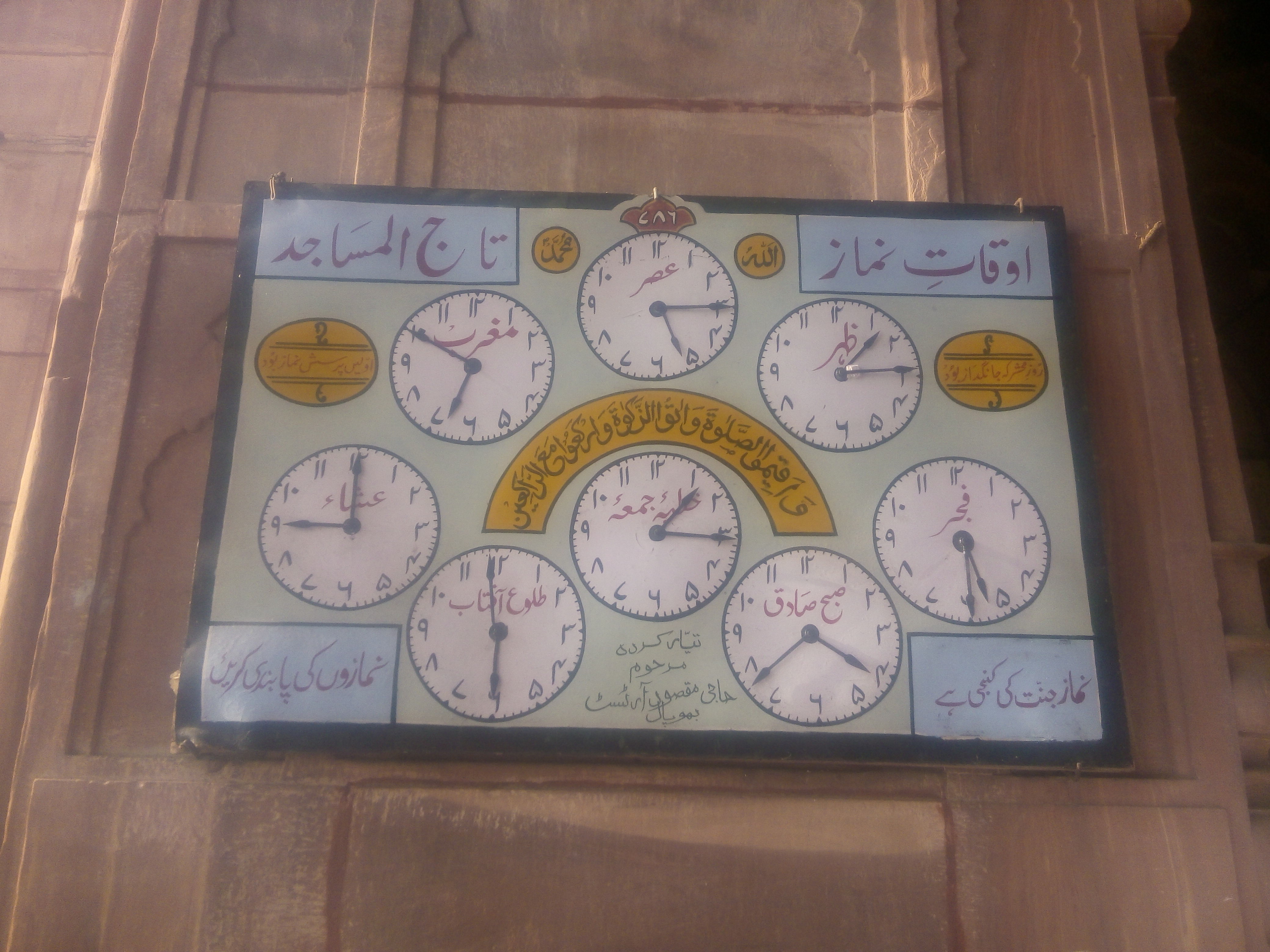
Clock showing Namaz timing

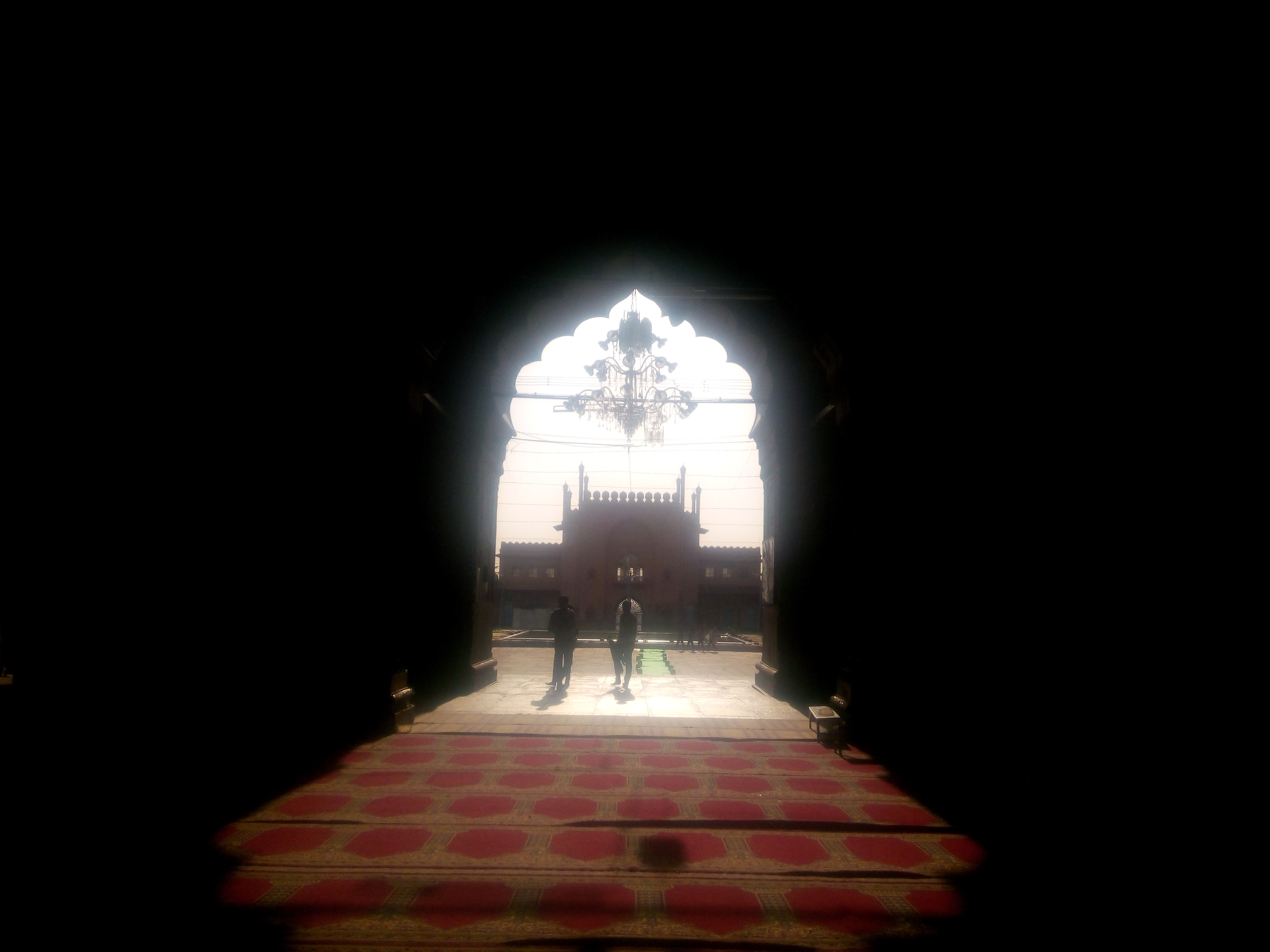
Interior of the mosque

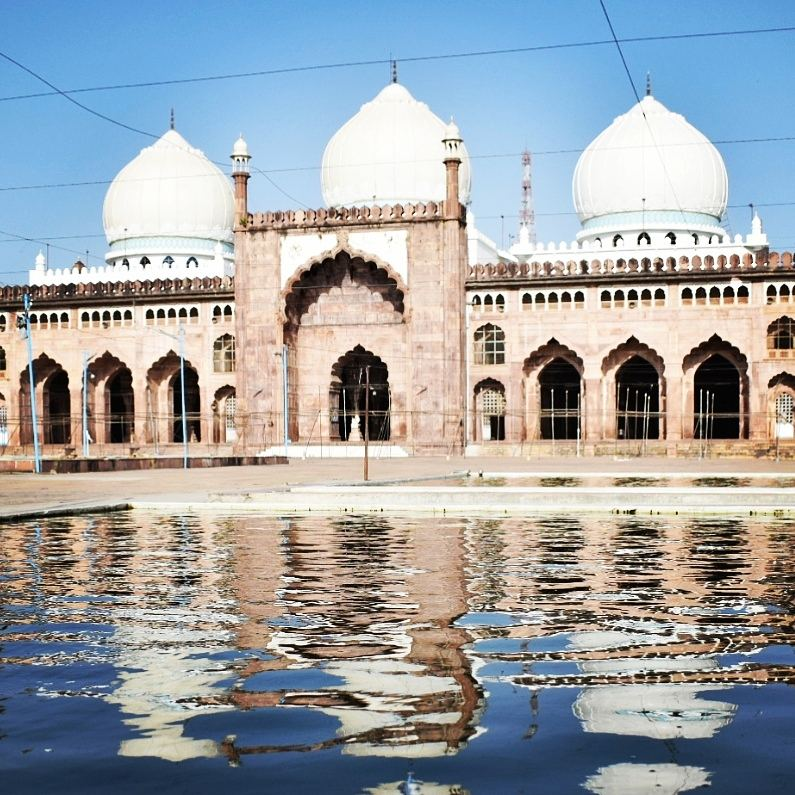
Interior of the mosque

== See also ==
- Islam in India
- List of mosques in India
- List of largest mosques
