= Ghasipura =

- Village
- Location in Odisha, India Ghasipura (India)
- Coordinates: 21.214°N 86.107°E
- Country: India
- State: Odisha
- District: Kendujhar

Government
  - Member of State Legislative Assembly: Shri Badrinarayan Patra (BJD)
- Elevation: 52 m (171 ft)

Languages
  - Official: Odia
- Time zone: UTC+5:30 (IST)
- PIN: 758015
- Telephone code: 06731
- Vehicle registration: OD-09
- Website: odisha.gov.in

Ghasipura, previously known as Ghasipada, is a census village and part of Anandapur is also an administrative block in Khaparakhai of Anandapur MPL in the Anandapur Subdivision of Kendujhar District, Odisha, India. The whole block comprises 179 villages including the village Ghasipura.

== Geography ==
The town lies on the right bank of the Baitarani River with geographic location 21.214°N 86.107°E. It has an average elevation of 52 m (171 ft) from mean sea level (MSL). The town is bounded by the Baitarani River to its north, Salapada to its east, Sailong to its west and Kainipura to its south. It is the part of Anandapur Municipality.
