= Anandapur =

- Subdivision
- Location in Odisha, India Anandapur (India)
- Coordinates: 21.21°N 86.11°E
- Country: India
- State: Odisha
- District: Kendujhar

Government
  - Type: Sub-Collector and Sub-Divisional Magistrate (SDM)
  - Body: Sri Nilamadhab Suna (OAS)
  - MLA: Abhimanyu Sethy (BJD)

Area
  - Total: 349.21 km^{2} (134.83 sq mi)
- Elevation: 43 m (141 ft)

Population (2026)
  - Total: 150,000+
  - Density: 430/km^{2} (1,100/sq mi)

Languages
  - Official: Odia, Ho
- Time zone: UTC+5:30 (IST)
- PIN: 758 021
- Telephone code: 06731
- Vehicle registration: OR-09/OD-09
- Website: anandapurmunicipality.in

Anandapur is a town in Kendujhar district in Odisha, India.

== Toponymy ==
The name Anandapur (called as A+nda+Pur) derives from आनन्द सहर which in Sanskrit means the "city of happiness". During the period of Raja Govinda Bhanja, it was known as Athagarh.

== Geography ==
Anandapur is located at 21.21°N 86.11°E. It has an average elevation of 43 m (141 ft). The town is situated on the bank of Baitarani River which flows on the southern side of the town. Madhubana is a well-known picnic place among the locals. The place like a small hill situated in the banks of the Baitarani and has tall pine-like trees. The scenery of Madhubana attracts people from nearby small villages during New Year. Anandapur barrage attracts people.

== Climate ==
Anandapur experiences three distinct seasons: summer, monsoon and winter. Typical summer months are from February to June, with maximum temperatures ranging from 35 °C to 45 °C. May is the warmest month in Anandapur, although summer doesn't end until May. The town often receives heavy thundershowers in May and the humidity level remains high. During the hottest months, the nights are usually very warm due to high humidity. The monsoon lasts from June to September, with moderate/high rainfall and temperatures ranging from 15 °C to 35 °C. Winter begins in October; the daytime temperature hovers around 28 °C (82 °F) while night temperature is below 15 °C for most of December and January.

== Economy ==
Most of the people depend on agriculture. Nowadays, most of people are inclined towards the business of transportation of iron ore mined from upper Keonjhar area meant for exports via Paradip Port through trucks and dumpers. Many of them are managing their livelihood by the means of small businesses. The most recent trend has been that many of younger generation are migrating to other states looking for jobs or opting for jobs in nearby steel plants of Kalinganagar (in neighbouring Jajpur district) after a degree or diploma in technical skill based education. As a result of all these, the per capita income of individuals has grown nowadays. Some people depend on businesses of handicraft and weaving. The town is known for its tasar silk handicraft. The political status is very complicated here and nowadays more and more people are being engaged in political and social works.

== Heritage sites ==
Anandapur is situated in the strike line of coastal and hilly regions. It is surrounded by green hills and situated on the bank of river Baitarani which is a sacred river of India. Also known as Budha Ganga, it is considered one of the oldest rivers in India. During the ruling of Keshari dynasty in Odisha many temples of Shiva were constructed. Along the banks of this river many temples of Lord Shiva can be found. The Jhadeswara temple, Balunkeswara Temple, Uttareswara temple, Kundeswara temples and others are here. The Kushaleswara Temple was built by Jajati Keshari. However, the town is well known for its Jagannath Temple known as "Dadhibaman Temple" which is the main temple of the town; and the culture of the town is deeply influenced by the rituals of this temple.

== Demographics ==
As of 2001 India census, Anandapur had a population of 35,043. Males constituted 51% of the population and females 49%. Anandapur had an average literacy rate of 72%, higher than the national average of 59.5%; with 57% of the males and 43% of females literate. 12% of the population was under 6 years of age.

== Administration ==
The city of Anandapur is managed by the Anandapur Municipal Council (AMC). However, it is also a sub-division of Keonjhar district, hence there is a sub-divisional officer (SDO) who governs the overall city.

== Politics ==
The MLA from Anandapur (SC) Assembly Constituency is Abhimanyu Sethi (BJD), who won the seat in State elections of 2024. and MP from Keonjhar in the 2024 Lok Sabha, Ananta Nayak.

== Culture and religion ==
With addition to Ratha Jatra and Bahuda Jatra of the Dadhibaman Jagannath Temple, every year the people here celebrate the Baruni Jatra. While Deogaon is known for the Jagara (Maha Sivaratri) festival around the Kushaleswara Temple, Kantipal celebrates Dola Purnima (Holi). Kantipal Behera Sahi celebrates Gaja Laxmi Puja every year. Idols of goddess Laxmi is worshipped during this event. The event continues for 3–5 days, and a fair for it is set up in Anandapur during that period attracting people from nearby small villages.

== Education ==
- Adarsha Vidyalaya, Salapada
- Anandapur College, Anandapur
- Anchalika Mahavidyalaya, Hatadihi
- Anandapur U.G.M.E. School (Model School)
- Anandapur UP School, Anandapur
- Balabhadra Narayana (B.N.) High School, Anandapur
- Brahmanidevi UP School, Anandapur
- Brajabandhu High School, Anandapur
- BT Women's College, Chhenapadi, Anadapur
- Govt. Girls High School, Anandapur
- Kanaka Manjari Women's College, Anandapur
- Saraswati Sishu Mandir, Anandapur
- KA Mohavidyalaya, Tarimul, Anandapur
- Fakirpur High School, Fakirpur
- Fakirpur Practicing primary School, Fakirpur
- Bodabil Primary School, Fakirpur
- Anandapur Regional B.Ed College, Fakirpur
- Fakirpur CT Training School, Fakirpur
- Fakirpur Govt. Girls' High School, Fakirpur

* Anchalik mahavidyalaya sadanga

== Transport ==
Ananadapur is connected by road from Bhubaneswar and Cuttack. NH-20 is the major national highway that runs through this area. The nearest railway station is Jajpur Kendujhar road. Buses and auto rickshaws run frequently from Anandapur to various surrounding rural villages. It is connected to Bhadrak and Baleswar by SH-53.

== Places of tourist interest ==
- At Hadagarh, the Salandi river flowing between two high mountains and a dam built over it are the main attractions for the tourists. This place is at a distance of 119 km from Keonjhar and 28 km from Anandapur town. Hadagarh is a reserved forest for elephants and tigers. It is near the Similipal National Park.
- Chakrateertha is about 3 km from Kantipal. It is known for its waterfall and scenery.
- Deogaon is known for the Kushaleswar Temple and the Pathara Bandha (stone embankment on the river Kusei).
- Along the riverbank many Siva temples were built by Keshri dynasty ruling the Odisha that time. The Siva temples are heritage sites and places for peace and devotion. They are Jhadeswar Temple, Uttareswar Temple, Balunkeswar Temple and Kundewar Temple.
- Balunkeswar Temple is situated in Village Fakirpur. It is one of the Buddhist site. Some of the idols have Buddhist culture imprints.
- Maa Gadachandi Temple is situated around Boula mountain near Sadha Chhak, 7 km From Chhenapadi Chhak, and 20 km from Anandpur. It is devotion of Maa Gadachandi, and it is a common place for picnics.
- Dargudisila is a tourist place in Anandapur. This is full of natural greenery sites and the river Baitarani flows through the hillside and stones around. This is a picnic and sightseeing spot. It is situated in a small village/hamlet called Dargudisila in Anandapur Tehsil in Kendujhar District of Odisha, India. It is located 59 km east of district headquarters Kendujhar, 26 km from Anandapur, and 154 km from state capital Bhubaneswar.
