= Tatanagar–Brahmapur Vande Bharat Express =

Mini Vande Bharat Express train route in India

Tatanagar Junction – Brahmapur Vande Bharat Express

Overview
- Service type: Vande Bharat Express
- Locale: Jharkhand and Odisha
- First service: 15 September 2024 (Inaugural); 18 September 2024; 20 months ago (Commercial)
- Current operator: South Eastern Railways (SER)

Route
- Termini: Tatanagar Junction (TATA); Brahmapur (BAM)
- Stops: 09
- Distance travelled: 587 km (365 mi)
- Average journey time: 09 hrs
- Service frequency: Six days a week (Note: Except Tuesdays)
- Train number: 20891 / 20892
- Lines used: Howrah–Nagpur–Mumbai line (till Rajkharsawan Jn); Rajkharsawan–Kendujhargarh–Jakhapura line; Howrah–Chennai main line (till Brahmapur)

On-board services
- Classes: AC Chair Car, AC Executive Chair Car
- Seating arrangements: Airline style; Rotatable seats
- Sleeping arrangements: No
- Catering facilities: On board Catering
- Observation facilities: Large windows in all coaches
- Entertainment facilities: On-board WiFi; Infotainment System; Electric outlets; Reading light; Seat Pockets; Bottle Holder; Tray Table
- Baggage facilities: Overhead racks
- Other facilities: Kavach

Technical
- Rolling stock: Mini Vande Bharat 2.0
- Track gauge: Indian gauge 1,676 mm (5 ft 6 in) broad gauge
- Electrification: 25 kV 50 Hz AC Overhead line
- Operating speed: 65 km/h (40 mph) (Avg.)
- Average length: 192 metres (630 ft) (08 coaches)
- Track owner: Indian Railways
- Rake maintenance: Tatanagar Jn (TATA)

The 20891/20892 Tatanagar–Brahmapur Vande Bharat Express is India's 57th Vande Bharat Express train, connecting the industrial city of Jamshedpur in Jharkhand with Brahmapur in Odisha.

This express train was inaugurated on September 15 2024, by Prime Minister Narendra Modi via video conferencing from the capital city of Ranchi instead of physically inaugurating at Tatanagar Junction in Jharkhand due to continuous rains in Jamshedpur.

== Overview ==
This train is currently operated by Indian Railways, connecting Tatanagar Jn, Chaibasa, Banspani, Kendujhargarh, Harichandanpur, Jakhapura Jn, Cuttack Jn, Bhubaneswar, Khurda Road Jn, Balugaon and Brahmapur. It currently operates with train numbers 20891/20892 on 6 days a week basis.

== Rakes ==
It is the fifty-fourth 2nd Generation and thirty-eighth Mini Vande Bharat 2.0 Express train which was designed and manufactured by the Integral Coach Factory at Perambur, Chennai under the Make in India Initiative.

== Service ==
The 20891/20892 Tatanagar Jn - Brahmapur Vande Bharat Express operates six days a week except Tuesdays, covering a distance of 587 km (365 mi) in a travel time of 9 hours with an average speed of 62 km/h (39 mph). The service has 9 intermediate stops. The Maximum Permissible Speed is 130 km/h (81 mph).

== See also ==
- Vande Bharat Express
- Tejas Express
- Gatiman Express
- Tatanagar Junction railway station
- Brahmapur railway station
