= Kundapitha =

Coordinates: 21°30′10.31″N 85°54′16.83″E

Kundapitha is a village situated in Ghatgaon tehsil, Keonjhar district, Odisha, India. Its nearest railway station is in Harichandanpur, accessible via National Highway 215. The village area is about 9 km^{2} or 2,192 acres.

Kundapitha (Deogarh, Odisha) is a village situated in Basalai Gram Panchayat of Barkote Panchayat Samiti of Deogarh district.
