= Sukinda Road railway station =

Railway station on the East Coast Railway network in India

Sukinda Road

General information
- Location: Sukinda Road, Odisha; India
- Coordinates: 20°58′30″N 86°03′06″E
- System: Indian Railways station
- Owner: Ministry of Railways, Indian Railways
- Line: Jakhapura-Tatanagar line
- Platforms: 1
- Tracks: 1

Construction
- Structure type: Standard (on ground)
- Parking: No

Other information
- Status: Functioning
- Station code: SKND
- Zone(s): East Coast Railway
- Division(s): Khurda Road
Location
- Location within India Location within Odisha

Sukinda Road railway station is a railway station on the East Coast Railway network in the state of Odisha, India. It serves Sukinda Road. Its code is SKND. It has one platforms. Passenger, Express trains halt at Sukinda Road railway station.

== Major trains ==
- Puri–Barbil Express
- Visakhapatnam–Tatanagar Weekly Superfast Express
- Khurda Road-Kendujhargarh MEMU
- Paradeep-Kendujhargarh MEMU

== See also ==
- Jajpur district
