= Visakhapatnam–Tatanagar Weekly Superfast Express =

Visakhapatnam - Tatanagar Weekly Superfast Express
Overview
- Service type: Superfast Express
- First service: 5 January 2014; 12 years ago
- Current operator: East Coast Railway

Route
- Termini: Visakhapatnam (VSKP); Tatanagar (TATA)
- Stops: 20
- Distance travelled: 865 km (537 mi)
- Average journey time: 15 hours 25 minutes
- Service frequency: Weekly
- Train number: 20815 / 20816

On-board services
- Classes: AC 2 Tier, AC 3 Tier, Sleeper Class, General Unreserved
- Seating arrangements: Yes
- Sleeping arrangements: Yes
- Catering facilities: E-Catering is Only Available at Visakhapatnam, Vizianagram & Tatanagar
- Observation facilities: Large windows
- Baggage facilities: Below Seats

Technical
- Rolling stock: LHB coach
- Track gauge: 1,676 mm (5 ft 6 in)
- Operating speed: 57 km/h (35 mph) average including halts
Route map
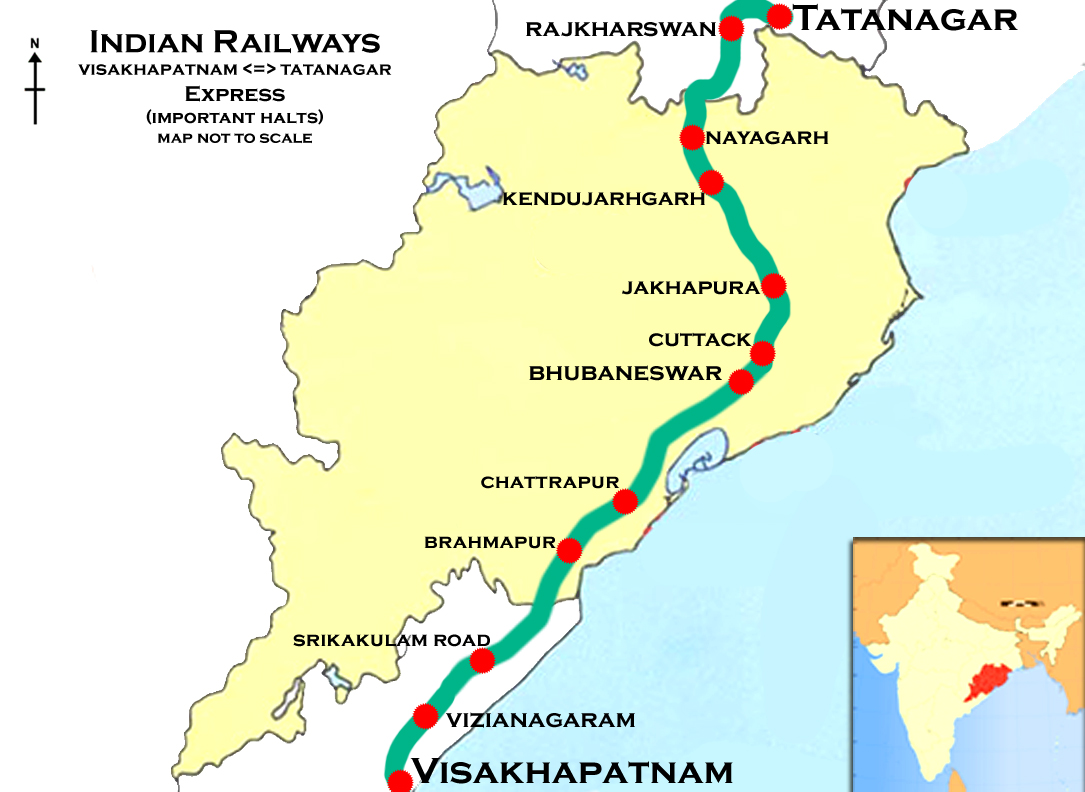

The 20815 / 20816 Visakhapatnam - Tatanagar Weekly Superfast Express is an intercity train of the Indian Railways connecting Visakhapatnam Junction in Andhra Pradesh and Tatanagar of Jharkhand. It is currently being operated with 20816/20815 train numbers on a weekly basis.

== Service ==
The 20816/Visakhapatnam - Tatanagar Weekly SF Express has an average speed of 57 km/h and covers 865 km in 15 hrs 05 mins. 20815/Tatanagar - Visakhapatnam Weekly SF Express has an average speed of 56 km/h and covers 865 km in 15 hrs 25 mins.

== Route & Halts ==
- Visakhapatnam Junction
- Vizianagaram Junction
- Brahmapur
- Khurda Road Junction
- Bhubaneswar
- Cuttack Junction
- Jakhapura Junction
- Harichandanpur
- Kendujhar
- Banspani
- Chaibasa
- Rajkharsawan Junction
- Tatanagar Junction

== Coach Composition ==
The train had standard LHB rakes with a max speed of 130 kmph. The train consists of 21 coaches:

- 1 AC II Tier
- 3 AC III Tier
- 11 Sleeper Coaches
- 4 General
- 1 Divyangjan cum Guard Coach
- 1 Generator Car

Loco	1	2	3	4	5	6	7	8	9	10	11	12	13	14	15	16	17	18	19	20	21
	EOG	GEN	GEN	A1	B1	B2	B3	S1	S2	S3	S4	S5	S6	S7	S8	S9	S10	S11	GEN	GEN	SLRD

== Traction ==
Train is hauled by a Visakhapatnam Loco Shed based WAP-7 Locomotive.
