= Pradhan Mantri Gati Shakti =

Indian megaproject

Prime Minister Gati Shakti
- Pradhānmantrī Gatī Shaktī

Agency overview
- Formed: 15 August 2021; 5 years ago

Prime Minister Gati Shakti, also known as National Master Plan for Multi-modal Connectivity (IAST Pradhānmantrī Gatī Shaktī) is an Indian megaproject worth $1.2 trillion USD to provide competitive advantage for manufacturing in India.

== History ==
On 15 August 2021, Narendra Modi, Prime Minister of India announced this project to boost Indian Economic Growth. The plan was launched on 13 October 2021 to provide multimodal connectivity infrastructure to all economic zones of India and approved on 21 October 2021 by Cabinet Committee on Economic Affairs.

== Aim and Project ==
The plan aims to bring all relevant ministries and departments of Government of India together and create a digital platform for more holistic and integrated planning of projects. For instance, it will interconnect ministries of Indian Roadways, Indian Railways, Indian airways and Indian waterways for easy movement of goods. It will also enable transparency in monitoring current projects and provide information about upcoming connectivity projects to the community. The main objectives of the plan is to achieve a sustained 5 trillion dollar economy and an increase to 20 trillion dollar economy by 2040. As part of this plan, Indian Railway will also develop 400 new Vande Bharat Express in 3 years. This plan will also add steam to 196 critical infrastructure gap projects from which 22 infrastructure projects have been initially approved. Indian Railways will also revamp 200 railway terminals within India with modern facilities and will additionally build 300 new terminals in next five years. This is thus aimed at revolutionizing India's infrastructure over the next five years.

The Cabinet Committee on Economic Affairs approved four key railway projects worth ₹11,169 crore under the Gati Shakti initiative in July 2025. These include capacity enhancements on the Itarsi–Nagpur, Aurangabad–Parbhani, Aluabari Road–New Jalpaiguri, and Dangoaposi–Jaroli corridors.

== See also ==
- Vande Bharat Express
- Amrit Bharat Station Scheme
- Dedicated freight corridors in India
- RapidX
- UDAN
- Dedicated Freight Corridor Corporation of India
