= Steel City =

Nickname for cities known for producing steel

The Steel City is a common nickname for many cities that were once known for their production of large amounts of steel. With industrial production also in developing countries, like those in Eastern Europe and Asia, most of these cities do not produce as much steel as they used to. It is possible there will be new steel cities in those developing countries.

Volta Redonda, Rio de Janeiro, Brazil; Sheffield, United Kingdom; Birmingham, Alabama, United States; Pittsburgh, Pennsylvania, United States; Gary, Indiana, United States; Lorain, Ohio, United States; Pueblo, Colorado, United States; Newcastle, New South Wales, Australia; Hamilton, Ontario, Canada; Sydney, Nova Scotia, Canada; Rourkela, Bokaro Steel City and Bhilai, India, are some of the cities most commonly referred to with this name, in their respective countries.

== List ==
- Anshan, China
- Bethlehem, Pennsylvania, United States
- Bhilai, India
- Birmingham, Alabama, United States
- Bokaro Steel City, India
- Buffalo, New York, United States
- Cherepovets, Russia
- Chhindwara, India
- Chorzów, Poland
- Cleveland, Ohio, United States
- Detroit, United States
- Duisburg, Germany
- Durgapur, India
- Gary, Indiana, United States
- Gwangyang, South Korea
- Hamilton, Ontario, Canada
- Jalna, Maharashtra, India
- Jamshedpur, India
- Jesenice, Slovenia
- Joda, India
- Johnstown, Pennsylvania, United States
- Kalinganagar, India
- Karadeniz Ereğli, Turkey
- Katowice, Poland
- Kitakyushu, Japan
- Košice, Slovakia
- Linz, Austria
- Lipetsk, Russia
- Lorain, Ohio, United States
- Magnitogorsk, Russia
- Middlesbrough, England
- Middletown, Ohio, United States
- Miskolc, Hungary
- Muroran, Japan
- Neuves-Maisons, France
- Newcastle, New South Wales, Australia
- Novokuznetsk, Russia
- Ostrava, Czech Republic
- Pittsburgh, Pennsylvania, United States
- Pohang, South Korea
- Port Talbot, Wales
- Pueblo, Colorado, United States
- Rourkela, India
- Salem, Tamil Nadu, India
- Sault Ste. Marie, Ontario, Canada
- Sheffield, England
- Sydney, Nova Scotia, Canada
- Tangshan, China
- Terni, Italy
- Vijayanagara, India
- Visakhapatnam, India
- Völklingen, Germany
- Volta Redonda, Brazil
- Whyalla, South Australia, Australia
- Wollongong, New South Wales, Australia
- Wuhan, China
- Youngstown, Ohio, United States
- Zenica, Bosnia and Herzegovina

== Gallery ==
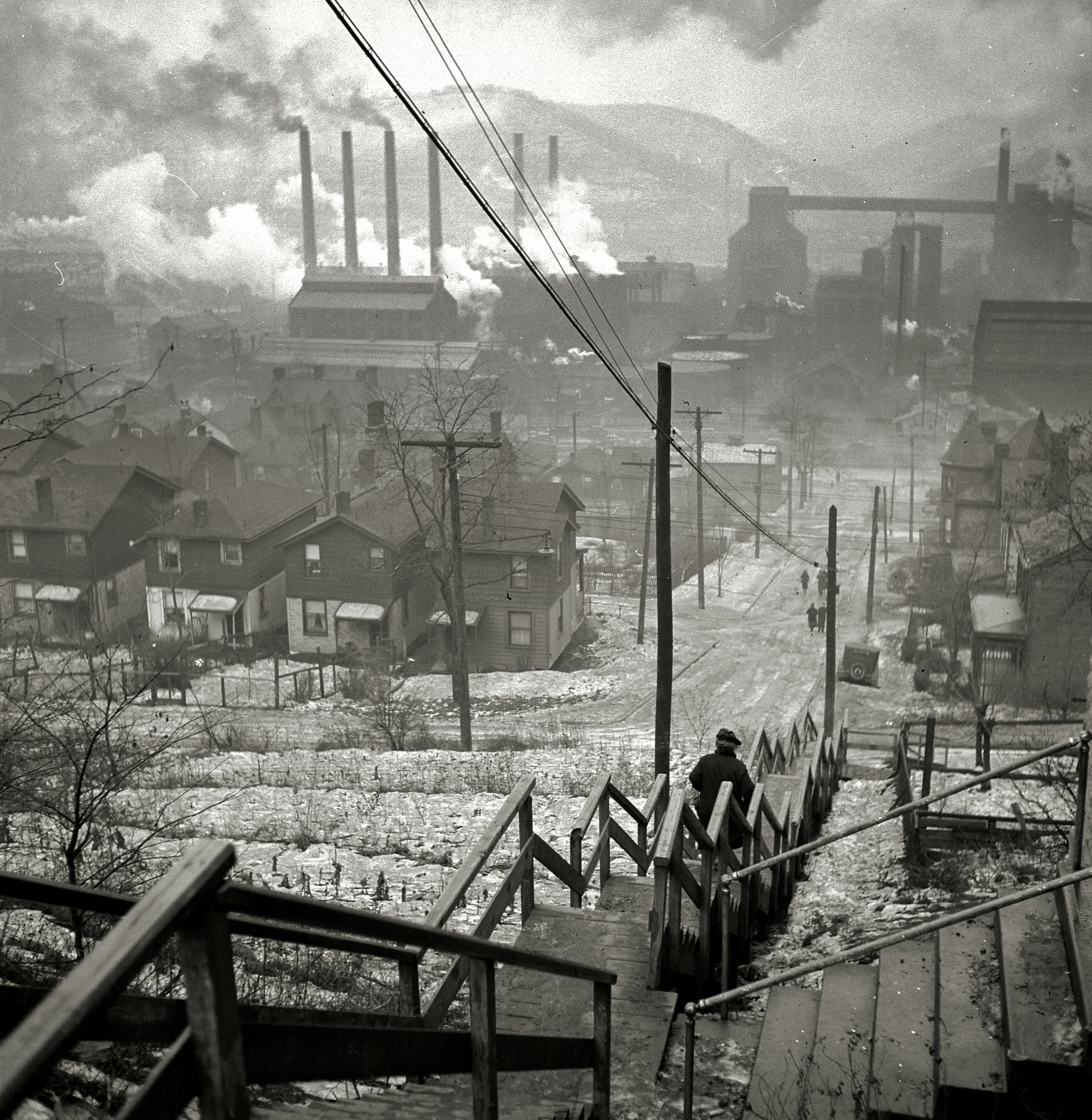
Pittsburgh, United States, was the largest steel-producing city in the world. This image shows the Mill District in 1940.

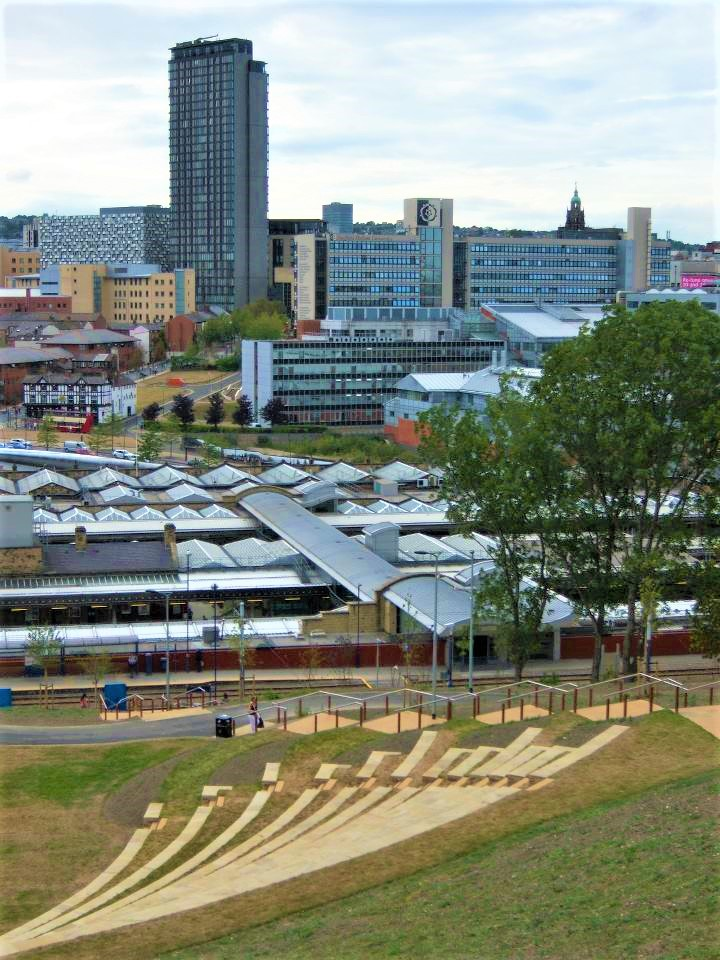
Sheffield, England

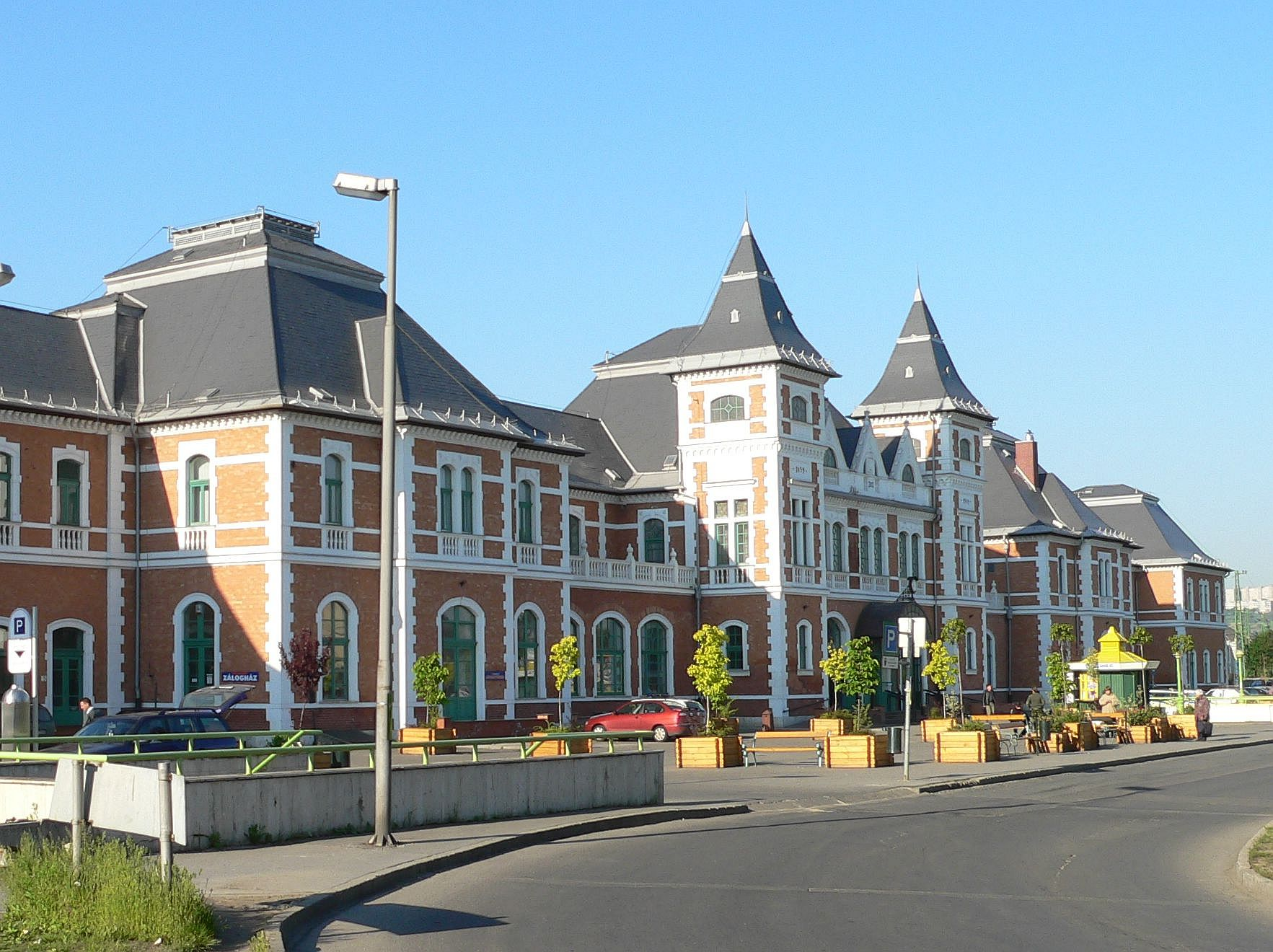
Miskolc, Hungary

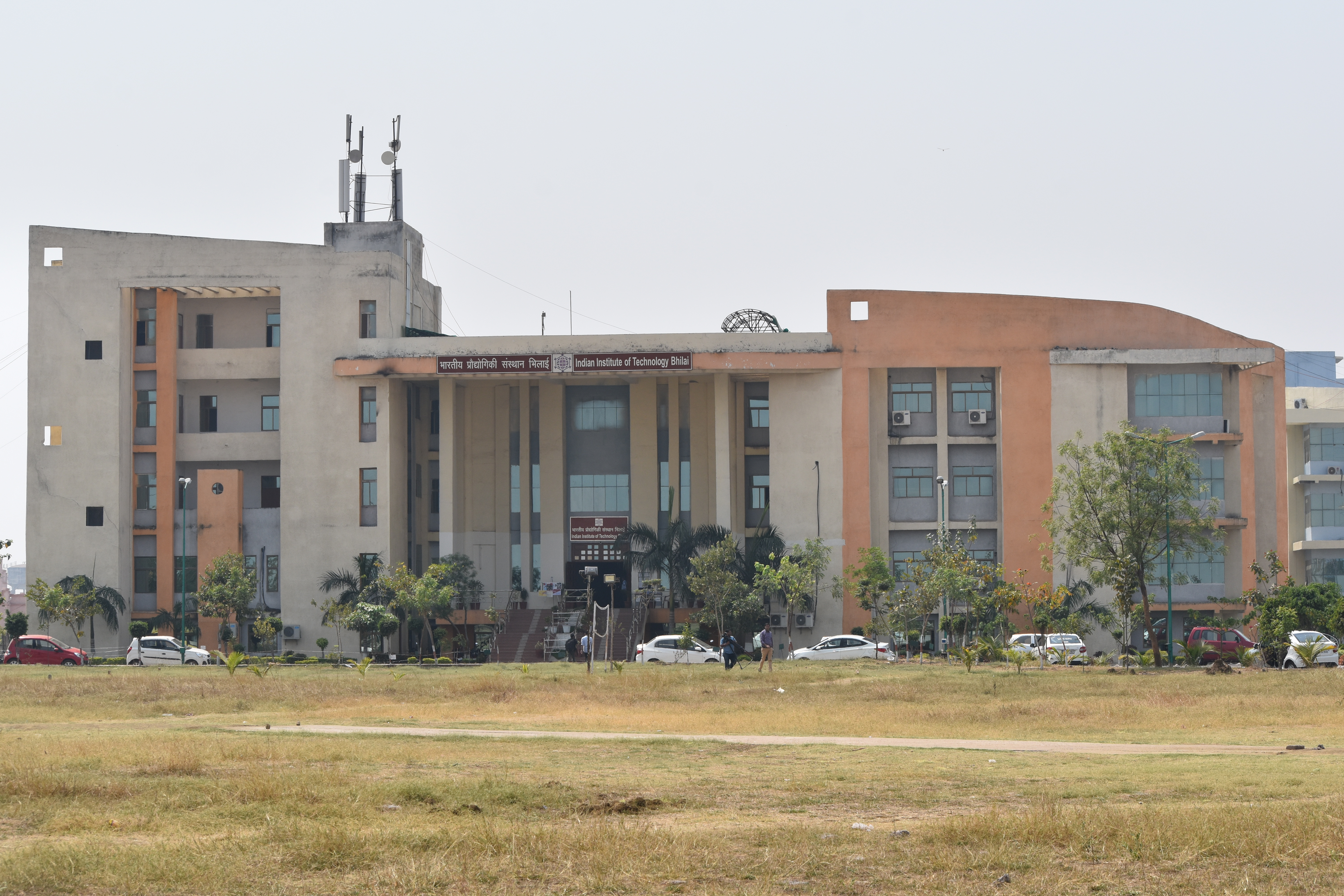
Bhilai, India, has the largest steel plant in Asia.

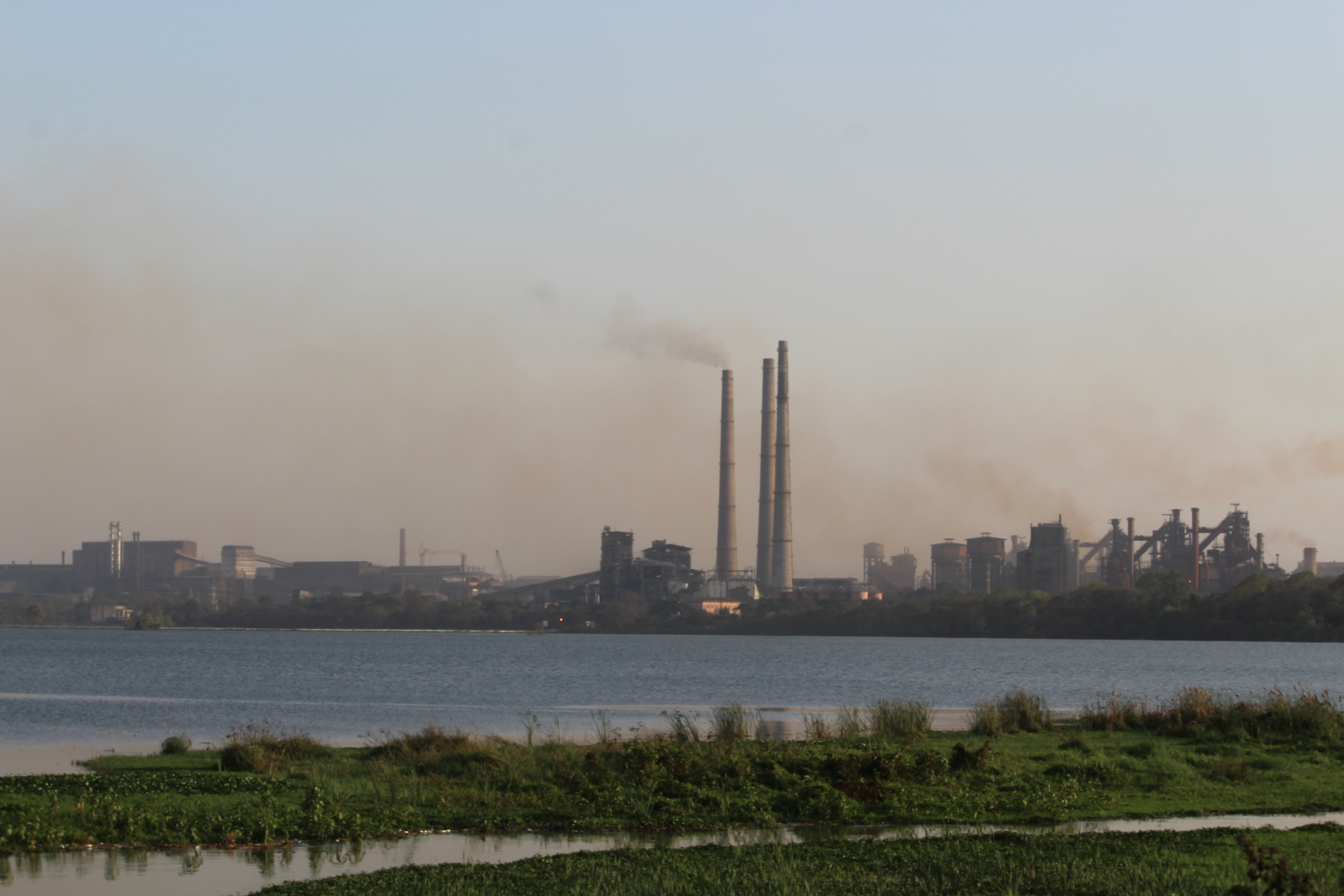
Bokaro Steel City, India, has Asia's second-largest steel plant.

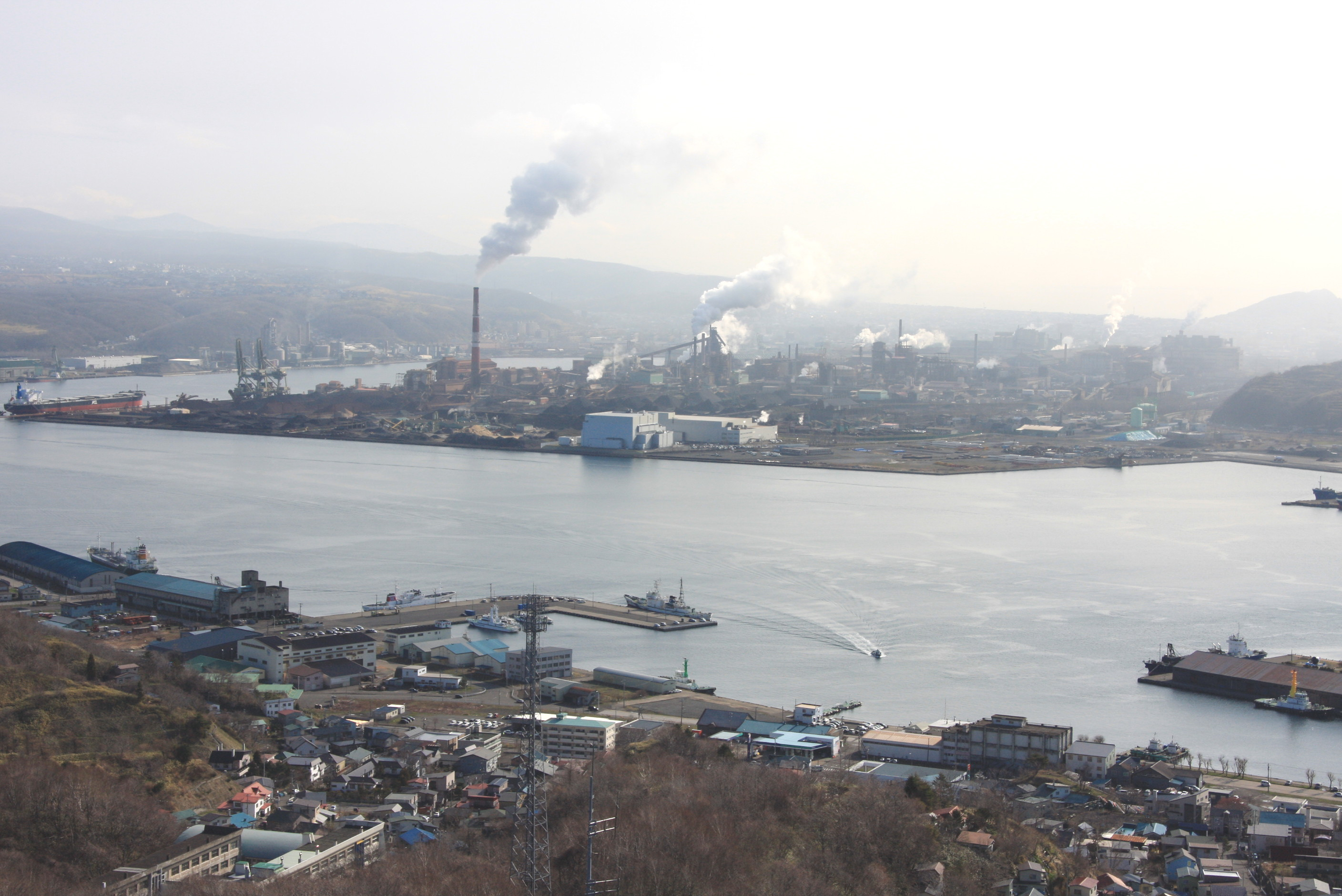
Muroran, Japan
