= Joda Block =

- Block
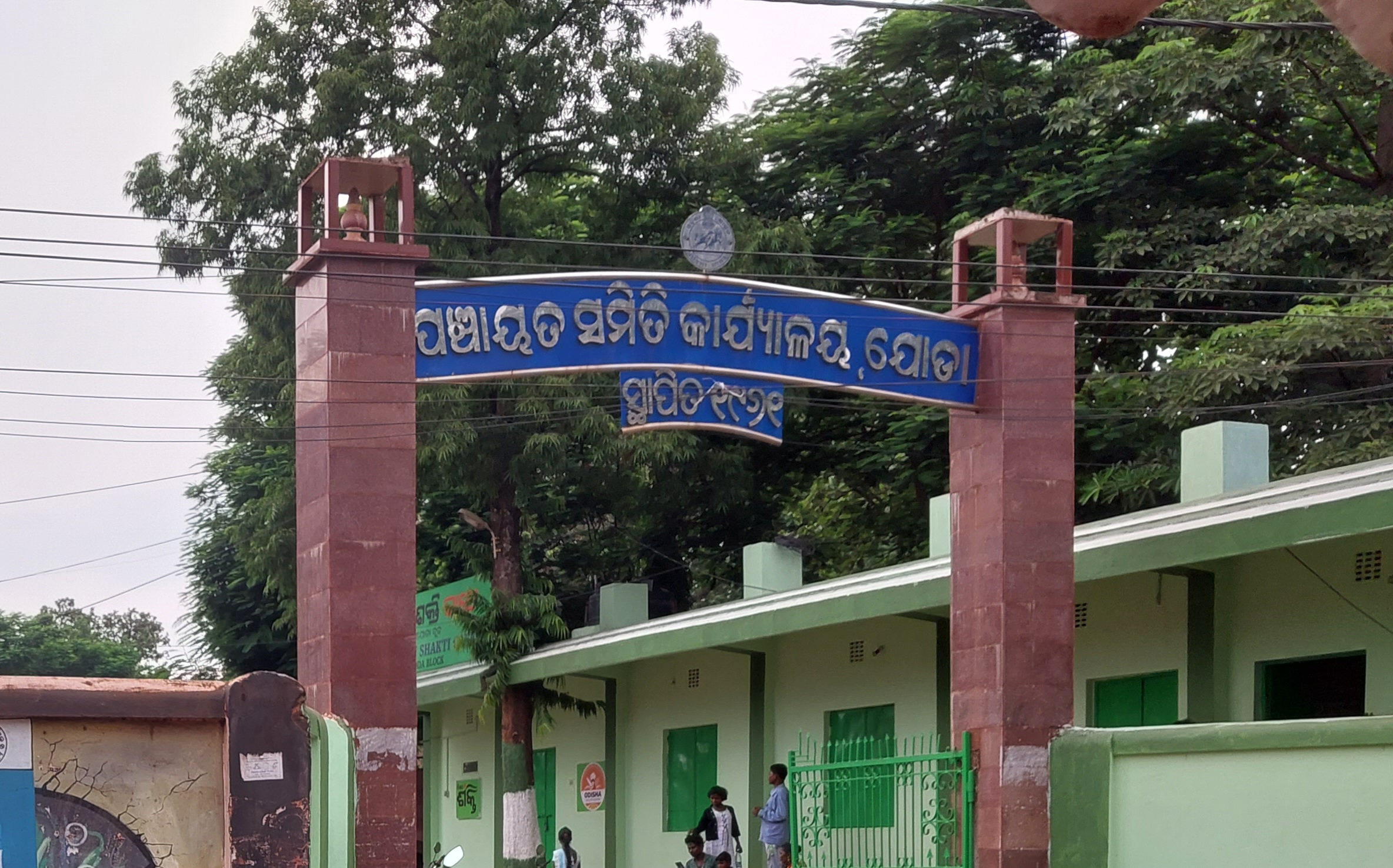
- Panchayat Samiti Office, Joda

- Location in Odisha, India Joda Block (India)
- Coordinates: 22.01667°N 85.43333°E, Panchayat Samiti Office, Baneikala Block Square, Joda Municipality Town - 758038
- Country: India
- State: Odisha
- District: Kendujhar
- Established: 01.04.1962
- Named for: Joda Village

Government
  - Type: Panchayati raj in India
  - Body: Sarpanch

Area
  - Total: 260.08 km^{2} (100.42 sq mi)

Population (2011)
  - Total: 125,728

Languages
  - Official: Odia, English
- Time zone: UTC+5:30 (IST)
- Website: panchayat.gov.in, panchayat.odisha.gov.in, kendujhar.nic.in,

Joda Block is an administrative grouping of villages within the Champua sub-division of Keonjhar District, in Odisha, India. The administrative building is situated at Baneikala Block Square in Joda Town. The Panchayat Samiti established on 1 April 1962. The Block area covered 260.08 sq. km and as per the 2011 census, total population of this block is 1,25,728.

== 19 Grama Panchayatas ==
Anseikala, Badkalimati, Balada, Balagoda, Bhadrasahi, Bhuyanroida, Birikala (incl. Bileipada), Bolani, Chamakpur, Deojhar, Guali, Jajamga, Jalahari, Jurudi, Kandara, Karakhendra, Laidapada, Palasa & Serenda.
