= Bileipada =

Village in Joda Block of Kendujhar district in Odisha, India

Coordinates: 21.862675°N 84.984367°E

Bileipada is a village located in Joda Block of Kendujhar district in Odisha, India. The village has a population of 300 of which 140 are males while 160 are females as per the Population Census 2011. Birikala, Bolita, Govindapur are nearby villages. The PIN Code of Bileipada is 770040.
