= Banspani railway station =

Railway Station in Odisha, India

Banspani
- Banspani

General information
- Location: Banspani Station, Joda Municipality Town-758034, Joda Block, Odisha; India
- Coordinates: 22°00′03″N 85°25′26″E
- Elevation: 489 m (1,604 ft)
- System: Halt Station
- Owner: Indian Railways
- Operator: Indian Railways
- Line: Padapahar Jn–Jakhapura line.
- Platforms: 1
- Tracks: 1,676 mm (5 ft 6 in)

Construction
- Structure type: NSG-6
- Parking: Not Available
- Accessible: Yes

Other information
- Status: Remotely Functioning
- Station code: BSPX
- Zone(s): South Eastern Railway
- Division(s): Chakradharpur

History
- Opened: 2011; 15 years ago
Location
- Location within Odisha Location within India

Banspani railway station (BSPX) serves Joda Municipality Town, Odisha and it is the smallest railway station of India with only 1 number of platform of 142.56 meter length. Also its a second major iron ore loading station, following Jaroli railway station-the highest iron ore loading station of the Indian Railways. Only four passenger trains Barbil-Puri-Barbil Indian class Intercity Express, Brahmapur-Tatanagar Vande Bharat Express, puri-Anand Vihar Terminal Weekly Express and Visakhapattnam-Tatanagar-Visakhapattnam Weekly Late Express runs through this station.
