= Harichandanpur railway station =

Railway station on the East Coast Railway network in India

Harichandanpur

General information
- Location: Harichandanpur, Odisha; India
- Coordinates: 21°19′28″N 85°47′40″E
- System: Indian Railways station
- Owner: Ministry of Railways, Indian Railways
- Line: Howrah–Chennai main line
- Platforms: 2
- Tracks: 4

Construction
- Structure type: Standard (on ground)
- Parking: No

Other information
- Status: Functioning
- Station code: HCNR
- Zone(s): East Coast Railway
- Division(s): Khurda Road
Location
- Location within India Location within Odisha

Harichandanpur railway station is a railway station on the East Coast Railway network in the state of Odisha, India. It serves Harichandanpur village. Its code is HCNR. It has two platforms. Express trains halt at Harichandanpur railway station.

== Major trains ==
- Puri–Barbil Express
- Visakhapatnam–Tatanagar Weekly Superfast Express
- Kendujhargarh–Khurda Road MEMU
- Paradeep-Kendujhargarh MEMU
- Puri-Anand Vihar Terminal Weekly Express
- Brahmapur-Tatanagar Vande Bharat Express

== See also ==
- Kendujhar district
