= Kendujhargarh railway station =

Railway Station in Odisha, India

Kendujhargarh

General information
- Location: Kendujhar, Odisha; India
- Coordinates: 21°39′36″N 85°37′36″E
- Elevation: 452 m (1,483 ft)
- System: Indian Railways station
- Owner: Indian Railways
- Operator: East Coast Railway
- Line: Padapahar–Jakhapura branch line
- Platforms: 3
- Tracks: 5 ft 6 in (1,676 mm) broad gauge

Construction
- Structure type: Standard (on-ground station)
- Parking: Available

Other information
- Status: Functioning
- Station code: KDJR
- Zone(s): East Coast Railway
- Division(s): Khurda Road

History
- Opened: 2009

Services
Preceding station	Indian Railways	Following station
Gualdih towards ?	East Coast Railway zone Padapahar–Jakhapura branch line	Naranpur towards ?
Location
- Location within Odisha Location within India

Kendujhargarh railway station, located in the Indian state of Odisha, serves Kendujhar (formerly called Keonjhar) in Kendujhar district. It is on the Padapahar–Jakhapura branch line.

== History ==
Construction of the line between Jakhapura and Daitari was sanctioned in 1976–77. It was commissioned in 1981. The 152 km (94 mi)-long Daitari–Banspani line was sanctioned in 1992–93 to facilitate transportation of iron ore for export through Paradip Port. The Banspani–Kendujhar section was operational in 2004. The Kendujhar–Tomka section was operational in 2007. Passenger trains started operating on this route in 2009.

== Geography ==
The area is a largely forested plateau.

== Trains ==
Among the trains available at Kendujhar are Barbil–Puri Express, Kendujhar–Bhubaneswar MEMU and Kendujhar - Paradeep MEMU which are now running daily. Also a VSKP–TATA–VSKP and Puri - Anada Vihar ( Delhi) - Puri Weekly Express was added on this route. More passenger and express trains is the requirement of Keonjhar. With the existing rush clearly there is requirement of three more daily trains to Bhubaneswar from here it can either passenger or express. Local trains are need to connect KDJR to Joda and Barbil which are nearest towns and popular destinations of this district.

Running train list:

- 18416/18415 PURI–BARBIL – PURI intercity ( Daily )
- 58425/ 58426 KENDUJHARGARH–KHURDA ROAD MEMU ( Daily)
- 08412 / 8411 KENDUJHARGARH - PARADEEP MEMU ( (Daily)
- 20816/20815 VISAKHAPATNAM –TATA NAGAR –VISAKHAPATNAM Superfast Express ( Weekly)
- 18427/18428 Puri–Anand Vihar Terminal Weekly Express
