= Barbil tehsil =

- Location in Odisha, India Barbil tehsil (India)
- Coordinates: 22.096646°N 85.38500422°E Kiriburu Square, Barbil - 758035
- Country: India
- State: Odisha
- District: Kendujhar
- Established: 01.04.1962
- Founder: Harekrushna Mahtab

Languages
  - Official: Odia, English
- Time zone: UTC+5:30 (IST)
- Website: kendujhar.nic.in

Barbil Tahsil is a tahsil in Kendujhar district, Odisha, India, having its office building at Kiriburu Square in Barbil Town.
