= Jaroli railway station =

Railway station in Odisha, India

Jaroli

General information
- Location: Jaroli (Jurudi), Odisha-758034. India
- Coordinates: 21°57′09″N 85°25′09″E
- System: Amrit Bharat Station
- Owner: Indian Railways
- Line: Padapahar - Jakhapura Line
- Platforms: 3 (2 in Under Construction)
- Tracks: 8 (Including Yards)

Construction
- Structure type: Amrit Bharat Station
- Parking: Yes (Planning under ABS scheme)

Other information
- Status: Functioning
- Station code: JRLI
- Zone(s): South Eastern Railway
- Division(s): Chakradharpur

History
- Opened: 2011
- Electrified: Double Line Electrified
Location
- Location within India Location within Odisha

Jaroli Railway Station is a railway station on the Padapahar Jn - Jakhapura Jn line in South Eastern Railway network in the state of Odisha, India. It serves Jaroli village, popularly known as Jurudi. Jaroli Station have a railway siding for loading of iron ores, is known for highest loading place of Odisha and 3rd highest loading place of country. Also its a top highest iron ore loading place in India. Tata Steel, Jindal Steel and OMC company have their largest mines in this Jurudi gram panchayat area and are active for extraction of iron ores from the beautiful hills around this village.

In January 2023, its selected under Amrit Bharat Station Scheme for develop the station with 2nd entrance, well planned parking place, improve lighting, properly designed signages, good widened approach road, high level platforms to handle 22 to 24 coach trains, Roof Plaza, different types of new and good accommodated waiting halls having cafeteria/retail outlets, dedicated pedestrian pathways. Unwanted structures will be wiped out. Also Free Wifi facility will be given to the passengers at the station; better furniture will be installed in waiting rooms, platforms, retiring rooms, and offices. So the passengers can stay comfortable and travel well through the train. There is also a provision to look at space for installing the 5G tower. Currently it has only one platform, but there are two more platforms are in under construction and will be inaugurate after completion of Jakhapura - Jaroli doubling project.

== Major trains ==
- 1 & only Puri-Barbil Express

== See also ==
- Kendujhar district
- Joda :- How the beautiful hill residents became labours.
