= Naranpur railway station =

Railway station on the East Coast Railway network in India

Naranpur

General information
- Location: Naranpur, Kendujhar, Odisha; India
- Coordinates: 21°37′00″N 85°38′13″E
- System: Indian Railways station
- Owner: Indian Railways
- Operator: East Coast Railway
- Line: Padapahar–Jakhapura branch line
- Platforms: 2
- Tracks: 5 ft 6 in (1,676 mm) broad gauge

Construction
- Structure type: Standard (on ground)
- Parking: No

Other information
- Status: Functioning
- Station code: NANR
- Zone(s): East Coast Railway
- Division(s): Khurda Road

History
- Opened: 2009
Location
- Location within India Location within Odisha

Naranpur railway station is a railway station on the East Coast Railway network in the state of Odisha, India. It serves Naranpur village on the outskirts of Kendujhar. Its code is NANR. It has two platforms. Passenger, MEMU, Express trains halt at Naranpur railway station.

== Major trains ==
- Puri–Barbil Express
- Khurda Road-Kendujhargarh MEMU
- Paradeep-Kendujhargarh MEMU

== See also ==
- Kendujhar district
