= Jakhapura Junction railway station =

Railway station on the East Coast Railway network in India

Jakhapura Junction

General information
- Location: Jakhapura, Odisha; India
- Coordinates: 20°54′59″N 86°03′52″E
- System: Indian Railways station
- Owner: Ministry of Railways, Indian Railways
- Line: Howrah–Chennai main line
- Platforms: 4
- Tracks: 8

Construction
- Structure type: Standard (on ground)
- Parking: No

Other information
- Status: Functioning
- Station code: JKPR
- Zone(s): East Coast Railway
- Division(s): Khurda Road
Location
- Location within India Location within Odisha

Jakhapura Junction railway station is a railway station on the East Coast Railway network in the state of Odisha, India. It serves Jakhapura village. Its code is JKPR. It has three platforms. Passenger, Express trains halt at Jakhapura Junction railway station.

== Major trains ==
- Puri–Barbil Express
- Visakhapatnam–Tatanagar Weekly Superfast Express
- 18427/18428 Puri–Anand Bihar Weekly Express

== See also ==
- Jajpur district
