= Harichandanpur =

Town in Odisha, India

Coordinates: 21.338260°N 85.792590°E

Harichandanpur is a medium size town located in Harichandanpur Block of Kendujhar district, Odisha, with total 442 families residing. The Harichandanpur town has population of 1990 of which 1106 are males while 884 are females as per Population Census 2011. Located in the southern part of Keonjhar district, near the border with Dhenkanal and Jajpur districts. It is a block headquarters, with several panchayats and villages under its administration.

Culture and Festivals:-

Local temples and shrines attract devotees throughout the year. Festivals like Rath Yatra, Durga Puja, Makar Sankranti, and Chaitra Parva are celebrated with enthusiasm.
