= Joda =

- Municipal Town
- Location in Odisha, India Joda (India)
- Coordinates: 22.01667°N 85.43333°E
- Country: India
- State: Odisha
- District: Kendujhar

Area
  - Total: 35 km^{2} (14 sq mi)

Population (2021)
  - Total: 201,392

Languages
  - Official: Odia, English
- Time zone: UTC+5:30 (IST)
- PIN: 758034 & 758038
- Telephone code: 06767
- Vehicle registration: OR 09/OD 09
- Website: odisha.gov.in, jodamunicipality.com, kendujhar.nic.in

Joda Town is a town and municipality in Keonjhar district in Joda Block, located 14 kilometers away from Barbil city or Barbil tehsil.

== Geography and politics ==
Joda is located in North Odisha state and in the Central East of India. The co-ordinates of this area are: 22.01667°N 85.43333°E. This area and the nearby all areas are surrounded by hills and all resident areas are in the hilly terrains. This area is well connected by latest built 4laned NH-520 to its state capital and nearby major areas like Rourkela, Kolkata etc.

=== Formation of Joda Municipality ===
The Joda area was a panchayat area called Joda Block. It was later declared as a NAC area with around 30,000 residents. After the 2001 census, a marginal population growth was identified here and the state government declared the area as an Urban Area called Joda Municipality Town.

The Joda Municipality Town formed with 14 wards;

- Ward No. 1 – Sashtrinagar, Baneikala Tisco Colony(part), Tarini hating & Hirakud Colony
- Ward No. 2 – Am Bagan, BD Patnaik Colony, Mukharji hating, DR Patnaik Colony, Block Colony, Patra sahi, MMTC Colony, Central Hospital Area
- Ward No. 3 – DB Singh Colony, Hudisahi, Kundurnala(part)
- Ward No. 4 – Kundurnala(part), Market Area, Muslim Basti, Jhumpudi hating, Jahira hating, Bharat Petrol Pump Area.
- Ward No. 5 – Azadbasti, Laxmi Padia Area
- Ward No. 6 – Bachu hating, Ramjan hating, Contractor Colony, Bhoot Bunglow, Joda east tisco mining camp
- Ward No. 7 – FAP Colony, Uli hating, Sahid Nagar, Dipu hating, Super Market Area
- Ward No. 8 – OPTCL Grid to Bus-stop Petrol Pump, Badal Singh hating, Joda Basti (Joda Village: - Joda Town origin), Madras Colony, Nalua Mohanty Sahi, RI Office Area
- Ward No. 9 – Joda west tisco mining camp(part), Kumar sahi, BSNL Telephone Exchange Office Area, Sawmill area to godown area
- Ward No. 10 – Shri Hanuman Colony, Damanipada, Chemri camp, Joda west tisco mining camp(part)
- Ward No.11 – Apat sahi, Murcza sahi, Sirish hating, Kedarsahi
- Ward No. 12 – Banspani Railway Colony Area
- Ward No. 13 – Banshapani Village, Khuntpani Village, Sargitalia Baitarani River Area
- Ward No. 14 – Bichakundi
