= National Highway 119A (India) =

Proposed national highway in India

National Highway 119A

- Schematic map of National Highways in India

Route information
- Auxiliary route of NH 19
- Length: 120 km (75 mi)

Major junctions
- North end: Sadisopur (Patna district)
- South end: Suara (Rohtas district)

Location
- Country: India
- States: Bihar

Highway system
- Roads in India; Expressways; National; State; Asian
← NH 131G	→ NH 19

National Highway 119A (NH-119A) or Patna-Arrah-Sasaram corridor is an under-construction 4-lane wide national highway in Bihar, India. The NH-119A connects NH-131G at Sadisopur in Patna district to NH-19 at Suara near Dehri-on-Sone in Rohtas district, via Arrah in Bhojpur district.

This highway is a spur of NH-19 and mostly runs along Sone river. A new bridge shall be constructed on Sone near Jalpura Tapa in Bhojpur connecting Ghoratap in Patna district.

== Route ==
The route of NH-119A from north to south is as follows:

- Sadisopur (Patna)
- Amhara (near IIT Patna)
- Jalpura Tapa
- Patar (near Arrah)
- Udwantnagar
- Garhani
- Tarari
- Dehri (Rohtas)

== Junctions ==
NH 131G Terminal near Sadisopur, Patna
NH 922
NH 319 near Patar, Arrah
NH 120 near Gorari, Karakat
NH 19 Terminal near Dehri

== Construction ==
The construction work of Patna-Arrah-Sasaram highway NH-119A has been divided into two packages by NHAI.

Sr. No	Package	Length in km	Contractor
1.	Suara (Rohtas)–Garhani (Bhojpur)	73.7	NKC Projects
2.	Section-1: Garhani (Bhojpur)–Patar (Bhojpur); Section-2: Ashani (Bhojpur)–Sadisopur (Patna)	46.4	Galfar Engineering

Package-2 is divided into two sections: Sadisopur on NH-131G (Patna district) to Ashani on NH-319 (Bhojpur) and Patar (near Udwantnagar) to Garhani (Bhojpur). Only the 10.6 Km long Garhani to Patar section is Brownfield, while rest is Greenfield.

== Status updates ==
- Oct 2022: Land acquisition going on in all three districts (Patna, Bhojpur and Rohtas) of Bihar by the NHAI.
- Mar 2025: The Cabinet Committee on Economic Affairs (CCEA), chaired by the PM Narendra Modi, has approved the construction of NH-119A.
- May 2025: NHAI has awarded the construction work of Package-1 to NKC Projects Pvt Ltd on 19 May and Package-2 to Galfar Engineering on 27 May.
- May 2025: Prime Minister Narendra Modi laid the foundation-stone of Patna-Sasaram NH-119A at a rally in Bikramganj, Rohtas district on 30 May 2025.

== See also ==
- List of national highways in India
- List of national highways in India by state
