= State Highway 12 (Bihar) =

Road in Bihar, India

State Highway 12

Route information
- Maintained by Bihar State Road Development Corporation (BSRDC)
- Length: 93 km (58 mi)

Major junctions
- North end: Arrah (Bhojpur district)
- South end: Sasaram (Rohtas district)

Location
- Country: India
- State: Bihar

Highway system
- Roads in India; Expressways; National; State; Asian; State Highways in Bihar

State Highway 12 (SH-12) or Arrah–Sasaram road is a state highway in Bihar state. It covers two major districts (Bhojpur district and Rohtas district) of Bihar state. This state highway starts from Ekawana village near Arrah and ends at Kuraich village near Sasaram.

== Route ==
The route of SH-12 from north to south direction is as follows:

- Zero mile, Arrah (NH-319)
- Udwant Nagar
- Garhani
- Charpokhari
- Piro (SH-102)
- Bikramganj (NH-120)
- Garh Nokha
- Sasaram (SH-17 and NH-19)

Note:

- from Arrah, NH-319 move west towards Jagdishpur, Dinara, Kochas and Mohania.
