= State Highway 81 (Bihar) =

Road in Bihar, India

State Highway 81

Route information
- Maintained by Bihar State Road Development Corporation (BSRDC)
- Length: 83.25 km (51.73 mi)

Major junctions
- North end: Sakaddi (Bhojpur district)
- South end: Nasriganj (Rohtas district)

Location
- Country: India
- State: Bihar

Highway system
- Roads in India; Expressways; National; State; Asian; State Highways in Bihar

State Highway 81 (SH-81) is a 83.25 Km long state highway in Bihar, India. It covers two major districts (Bhojpur and Rohtas) of Bihar. This state highway starts from Sakaddi near Arrah and ends at Nasriganj near Dehri-on-Sone and Daudnagar. SH-81 is also known as the Sakaddi-Sahar-Nasriganj road.

== Route ==
The route of SH-81 from north to south direction is as follows:

- Sakaddi
- Kulharia railway station
- Chandi
- Jalpura Tapa
- Akhgaon
- Sandesh
- Sahar (near Arwal)
- Nasriganj

Note:

- from Sakaddi, NH-922 move west towards Arrah & Buxar; or east towards Koilwar, Bihta, Danapur & Patna.
- from Nasriganj, SH-15 moves south towards Dehri-on-Sone
- from Nasriganj, NH-120 move east towards Daudnagar & Gaya; or north-west towards Bikramganj & Dumraon.

== Junctions ==
- NH 922 at Sakaddi
- NH 120 at Nasriganj
