= Jalpura Tapa =

Indian village in Bhojpur district, Bihar

- Village
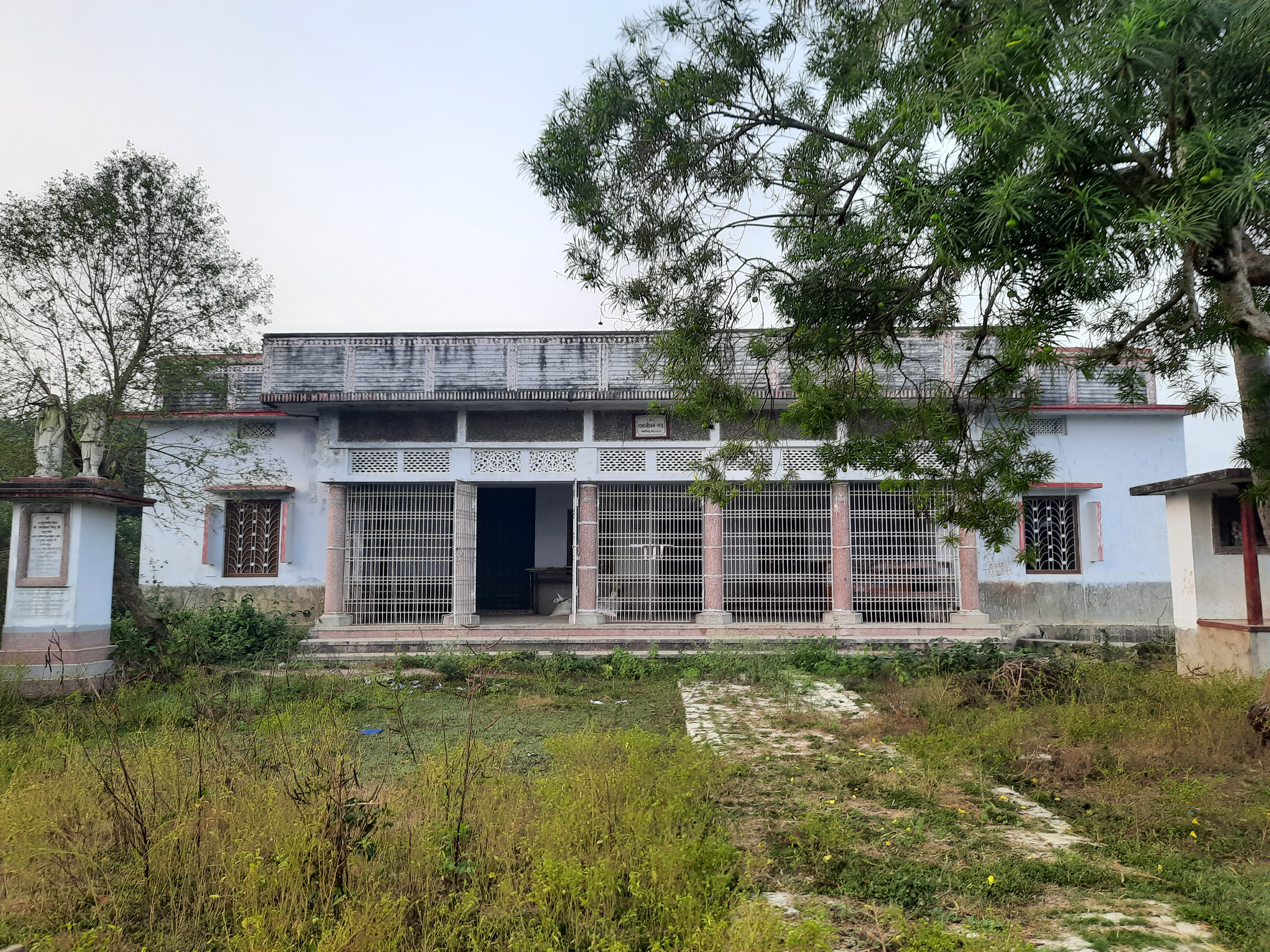
- Ramjivan Garh house at Jalpura Tapa (built in 1971)

- Location in Bihar, India Jalpura Tapa (India)
- Coordinates: 25°29′21″N 84°44′25″E
- Country: India
- State: Bihar
- Division: Patna
- District: Bhojpur
- Block: Koilwar

Government
  - Type: Gram panchayat
  - Body: Jalpura Panchayat
  - MLA: Kiran Devi Yadav

Population (2011)
  - Total: 12,168
- Time zone: UTC+5:30 (IST)
- PIN Code: 802352
- Telephone code: +91-6182
- Vehicle registration: BR-03

Jalpura Tapa (Hindi: जलपुरा तापा) is a village and gram panchayat in Koilwar block, Bhojpur district in the Indian state of Bihar. Situated close to the Sone River, it is a large village with more than 12,000 residents. Population-wise it is the largest village and area-wise, it is the 2nd-largest village of Koilwar block.

The Varanasi-Howrah high-speed rail corridor (HSR) is proposed to pass through Bhojpur district with a Bullet train station at Udwant Nagar. The alignment of Bullet train will cross the Sone River near Jalpura Tapa and enter Patna district.

== About ==
Twelve villages fall in the Tapa region on the banks of the Sone River in Bihar. This includes 9 villages of the Bhojpur district which are located on the west side of river and 3 villages of the Patna district which are located on the east side of the river.

The list of Tapa villages is as follows: Jalpura Tapa, Bhgwatpur, Bishunpur, Akhgaon, Pandura, Nasratpur, Narainpur and Sarimpur Bachri in Bhojpur district; and Bindaul, Ghoratap and Bishunpura in Patna district.

== Geography ==
Jalpura Tapa village is in Bhojpur district of Bihar and is situated near Akhgaon village on Sakaddi-Nasriganj highway (SH-81). It falls under the Chandi police station limits of Bhojpur Police. Jalpura Tapa village is 12 km from Arrah and around 42 km from state capital Patna.

It is located between Kulharia and Sandesh on SH-81 highway. Jalpura Tapa is adjacent to Akhgaon village, which is on the banks of the Sone River. In this region, Sone river flows from south to north, separating the Bhojpur district in the west and Patna district in the east side.

== Demographics ==
The total population of village in 2011 Census was 12,168 out of which 6,432 were males while 5,736 were females. The Jalpura Tapa village has a higher Literacy rate than Bihar's average. In the 2011 Census, the literacy rate of the village was 64.40 % compared to 61.80 % of Bihar.

== Transport ==
Jalpura Tapa is well connected by roads to Patna, Arrah, Bihta, Koilwar, Sandesh and Sahar.

=== Highway ===
- Sakaddi–Sahar–Nasriganj (SH-81)
- Patna–Arrah–Sasaram (NH-119A)

=== Railway ===
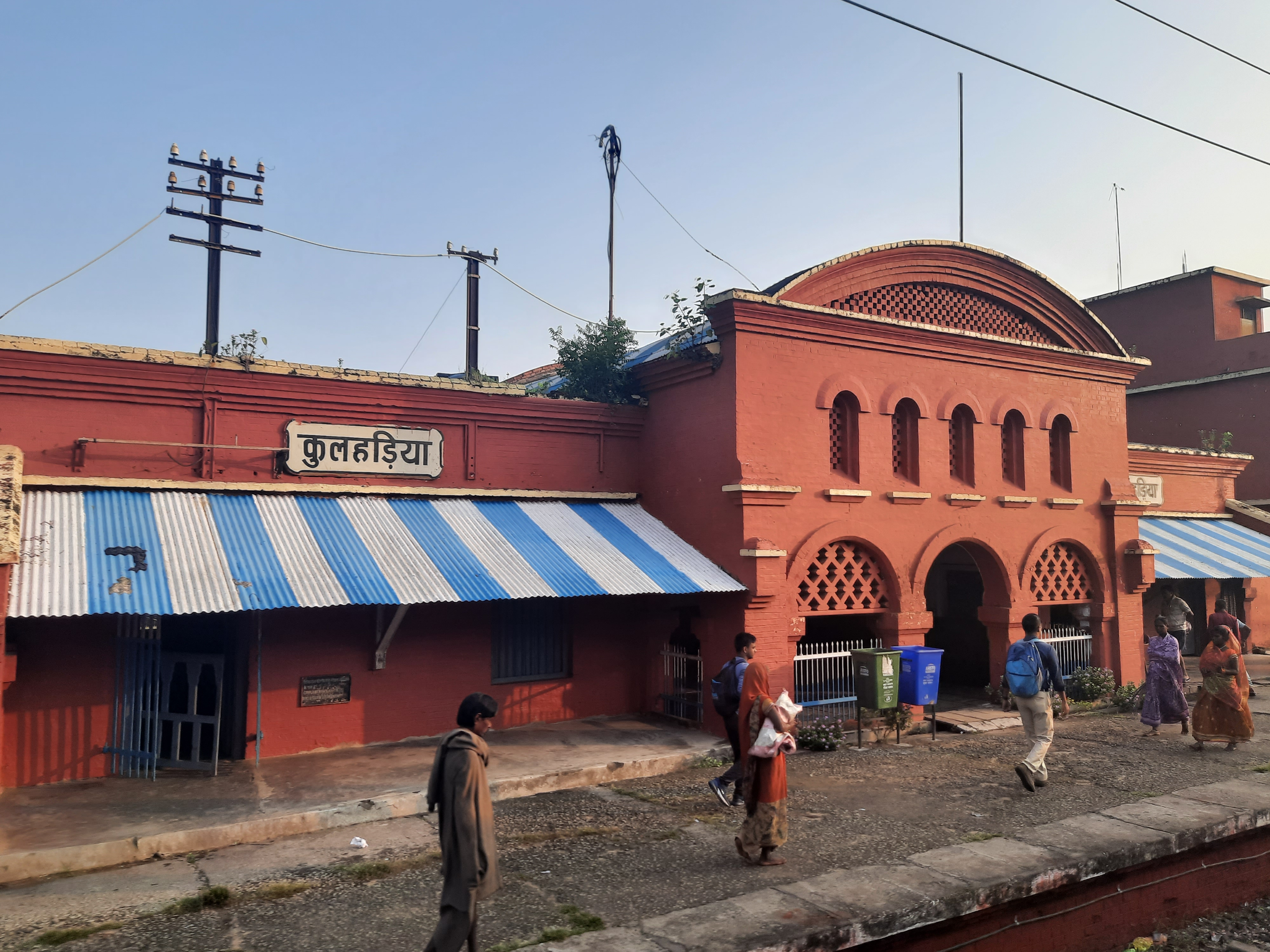
Kulharia railway station (KUA) in Bihar

The nearest railway station is Kulharia railway station (KUA) on the Patna-Mughalsarai section.

- Patna Junction (49 km)
- Arrah Junction (12 km)
- Bihta railway station (25 km)
- Kulharia railway station (9 km)

=== Airway ===
- Patna Airport (48 km)
- Bihta Airport (25 km)

== Politics ==
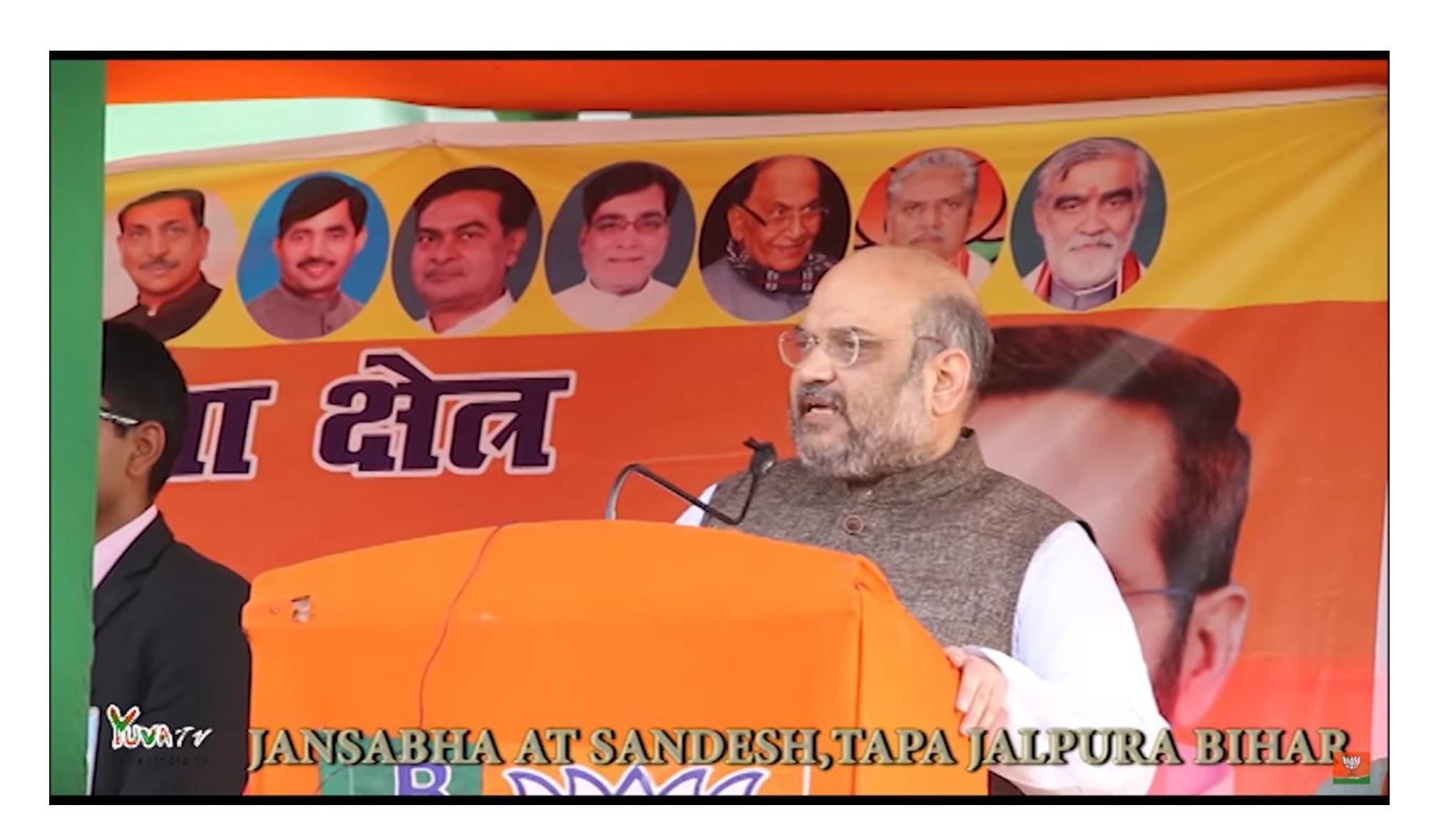
Amit Shah at Jalpura Tapa (Bihar) in 2015

The Jalpura Tapa village is a part of Sandesh assembly constituency under the Arrah Lok Sabha since 2008. On 19 October 2015, Bharatiya Janata Party's then President Amit Shah had come here to attend a public rally.

=== Gram Panchayat ===
The Jalpura Tapa Gram panchayat is headed by a Sarpanch and comprises five villages: Jalpura Tapa, Rampur, Ratanpur, Mathiyapur and Salempur. All villages of the Bhojpur district fall under the Bhojpur Zila Panchayat.

== Education ==
There are five schools run by the Government of Bihar in this village. Only two schools provide education to students till Matriculation (10th).

- M.S. Jalpura Tapa (class 10)
- U.H.S. Jalpura Tapa (class 10)
- P.S. Jalpura Tapa (class 5)
- N.P.S. Mathiapur (class 5)
- N.P.S. Salempur West Tola

== See also ==
- Arrah Lok Sabha constituency
- Koilwar
- List of villages in Bhojpur district
