= Udwantnagar =

Udwant Nagar उदवंत नगर
- Village
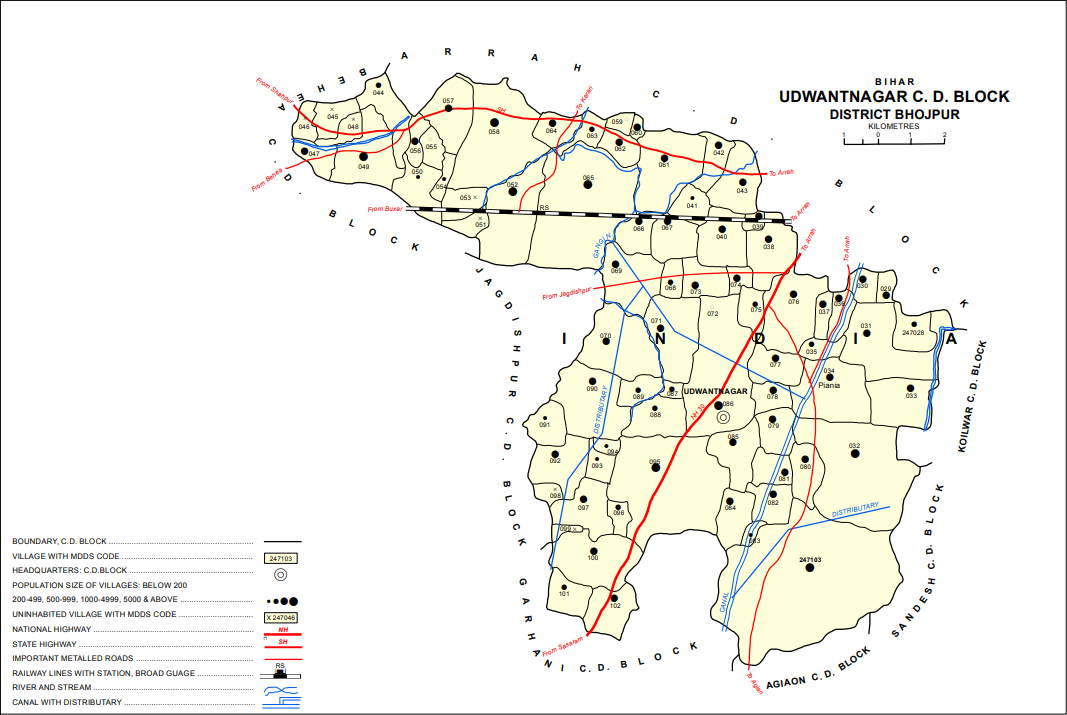
- Map of Udwantnagar block

- Location in Bihar, India Udwant Nagar (India)
- Coordinates: 25.50542°N 84.62164°E
- Country: India
- State: Bihar
- District: Bhojpur

Area
  - Total: 0.625 km^{2} (0.241 sq mi)
- Elevation: 67 m (220 ft)

Population (2011)
  - Total: 9,000
  - Density: 14,000/km^{2} (37,000/sq mi)

Languages
  - Official: Bhojpuri, Hindi
- Time zone: UTC+5:30 (IST)

Udwantnagar or Udwant Nagar (Hindi: उदवंत नगर) is a village and corresponding community development block in Bhojpur district of Bihar, India. As of 2011, its population was 9,000, in 1,496 households. The total block population was 157,809, in 24,336 households.

== Demographics ==
Udwant Nagar is a rural block, with no major urban centres. As of 2011, the block's sex ratio was 910, which was slightly higher than the overall district ratio of 907 and exactly equal to the rural district ratio. The sex ratio was marginally higher in the 0-6 age group, with 912 females for every 1000 males, which was slightly lower than the district ratio of 918 for this age group. Members of scheduled castes made up 18.87% of the block's population, and members of scheduled tribes made up 0.08%. The literacy rate of Udwantnagar block was 69.41%, which was slightly lower than the overall district literacy rate of 70.47% but about equal to the rural rate of 69.16%. Literacy was higher in men (81.68%) than in women (55.93%), with the corresponding 25.75% gender gap being slightly higher than the district average of 23.71% but, similarly, about equal to the rural gap of 25.45%.

Most of Udwantnagar block's workforce was engaged in agriculture in 2011, with 33.72% being cultivators who owned or leased their own land (the highest percentage in Bhojpur) and another 44.47% being agricultural labourers who worked another person's land for wages. 2.71% were household industry workers (the lowest percentage in Bhojpur), and the remaining 19.09% were other workers. Most workers were men (36,692, compared to 8,808 women) and thus male workers outnumbered female ones in each of the four categories of employment; however, the proportion of women was higher in the categories of agricultural labourers (63.45%, compared to 39.92% for men) and household industry workers (4.02%, compared to 2.40% for men).

== Transport ==
Udwant Nagar is well connected by roads, highways and Rail routes to various cities like Patna, Arrah, Bikramganj, Sasaram, Jagdishpur and Mohania in Bihar; and Chandauli and Mughalsarai in Uttar Pradesh.

=== Roads ===
- Arrah-Dinara-Mohania (NH-319)
- Arrah-Bikramganj-Sasaram (SH-12)

=== Railway ===
- Arrah Junction: ARA (5 km)
- Koilwar railway station: KWR (19 km)
- Bikramganj railway station: XBKJ (50 km)
- Sasaram Jn. railway station: SSM (90 km)

=== Airway ===
- Patna Airport (55 km)
- Bihta Airport (35 km)

=== Bullet train ===
The Varanasi-Howrah high-speed rail corridor (HSR) is proposed to pass through Bhojpur district with a Bullet train station at Udwant Nagar. It will cross the Sone River near Jalpura Tapa village and enter Patna district.

== List of Villages ==
Udwantnagar block contains the following 76 villages: (GP = Gram Panchayat)

| Village name | Total land area (hectares) | Population (in 2011) |
|---|---|---|
| Udwantnagar (GP & block HQ) | 625 | 9,000 |
| Diliya | 142 | 836 |
| Milki | 46 | 1,344 |
| Gorhna | 75 | 1,488 |
| Bakri (GP) | 482 | 4,580 |
| Sarthua (GP) | 867 | 6,363 |
| Khalisa | 277 | 2,169 |
| Piania (GP) | 413 | 4,933 |
| Khajuata | 72 | 541 |
| Dariapur | 86.8 | 1,751 |
| Chakia | 66.9 | 1,191 |
| Bhelain | 263 | 3,384 |
| Kalyanpur | 47 | 1,118 |
| Chorain | 237 | 1,987 |
| Chaursani | 84 | 499 |
| Akhtiarpur | 130 | 3,677 |
| Pakariabar | 222 | 2,000 |
| Saraiya | 206 | 832 |
| Madhubani | 110 | 0 |
| Sikandarpur | 82 | 0 |
| Bargahi | 82 | 1,294 |
| Bhopatpur | 59 | 0 |
| Chhotka Sasaram (GP) | 336 | 6,399 |
| Dubedah | 175 | 340 |
| Kawal Kundi | 98 | 0 |
| Nawada Ben (GP) | 434 | 7,129 |
| Misraulia | 100 | 0 |
| Pirozpur | 54 | 498 |
| Mahuli Khurd | 66 | 90 |
| Mahuli Buzurg | 64 | 2,011 |
| Nawa Nagar | 232 | 3,083 |
| Karisath (GP) | 635 | 6,137 |
| Rampur | 49 | 186 |
| Milki | 27 | 1,781 |
| Bampali (GP) | 406 | 4,442 |
| Bishunpur | 107 | 1,819 |
| Bibiganj | 94 | 845 |
| Harnath Kundi | 109 | 1,013 |
| Masarh (GP) | 919 | 8,102 |
| Mahatwania | 129 | 1,286 |
| Dehri | 171 | 1,149 |
| Salthar | 77 | 677 |
| Asani (GP) | 229 | 3,498 |
| Jaitpur | 408 | 2,847 |
| Garha | 342 | 1,474 |
| Patar | 91 | 124 |
| Malthar | 147 | 1,343 |
| Behra Sabalpur | 59 | 1,008 |
| Tetaria | 89 | 732 |
| Ekauna (GP) | 350 | 3,558 |
| Deoria | 162.2 | 1,665 |
| Bajruha | 112 | 1,208 |
| Savgar | 134 | 1,073 |
| Kharauni | 152 | 1,207 |
| Nima | 115 | 1,057 |
| Sakhua | 145 | 1,489 |
| Kusamhi | 34 | 471 |
| Kusumha (GP) | 159 | 1,770 |
| Surni | 210 | 2,254 |
| Bhupauli | 36 | 734 |
| Konhara | 175 | 522 |
| Raghopur | 113 | 766 |
| Sonpura (GP) | 497 | 2,162 |
| Indarpura | 127 | 378 |
| Birampur | 221 | 1,370 |
| Khiritanr | 86 | 380 |
| Khiritanr Milki | 34 | 397 |
| Kasap (GP) | 972 | 6,970 |
| Sirampur | 62 | 520 |
| Morath | 236 | 1,675 |
| Bhawanpur | 47 | 0 |
| Mangatpur | 37 | 0 |
| Eraura (GP) | 338 | 2,320 |
| Basauri | 138 | 834 |
| Demhan | 195 | 1,316 |
| Belaur (GP) | 1,840 | 14,713 |
