= Infrastructure Development Authority Bihar =

Infrastructure Development Authority in Bihar

- IDA
- Official logo of IDA Patna

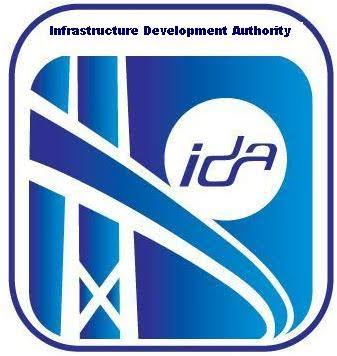
- IDA Patna Logo

Agency overview
- Formed: 27 April 2006
- Type: A Government of Bihar Undertaking
- Jurisdiction: Government of Bihar
- Headquarters: Udyog Bhawan, East Gandhi Maidan, Patna
- Employees: 134
- Minister responsible: Sushri Shreyasi Singh, Minister, Department of Industries
- Agency executives: Shri Pratyaya Amrit, IAS, Chief Secretary, Chairman; Shri Mihir Kumar Singh, IAS, Development Commissioner, Vice-Chairman; Shri Kundan Kumar, IAS, Secretary cum Managing Director (MD), Department of Industries
- Parent department: Department of Industry
- Website: idabihar.com state.bihar.gov.in/industries

Infrastructure Development Authority (IDA, Patna) (Hindi: आधारभूत संरचना विकास प्राधिकार) has been constituted under the chairmanship of the Chief Secretary, Government of Bihar under the Bihar State Infrastructure Development Enabling Act 2006 to provide for the rapid development of physical and social Infrastructure in the State and to attract private sector participation in designing, financing and construction of Infrastructure Projects, more than 150 projects completed. It is the nodal agency of the state government for public-private partnership (PPP) initiatives in the State. It is proceed by the board of directors (BOD), which constitute of secretary of various departments as ex officio member, also including Director (Administration), Director (Project Implementation) and Director (Finance). IDA is committed to the development of infrastructure in the state of Bihar, including roads, buildings, health, irrigation, and water management. Land availability is a major concern in the establishment of projects. A Land Bank has been established in IDA to ensure timely acquisition of Land and providing immediate fund for land acquisition. The authority works under the Industries department, Government of Bihar.

== See also ==
- Maharashtra Industrial Development Corporation
- Bihar Urban Infrastructure Development Corporation
- Bihar State Road Development Corporation
- Housing and Urban Development Corporation
- NOIDA
- Department of Infrastructure and Industrial Development
- Uttar Pradesh State Industrial Development Corporation
- Delhi Development Authority
- Indore Development Authority
- Andhra Pradesh Industrial Infrastructure Corporation
- Greater Noida Industrial Development Authority
- Gujarat Industrial Development Corporation
- Odisha Industrial Infrastructure Development Corporation
- State Infrastructure and Industrial Development Corporation of Uttarakhand Limited
- Telangana State Industrial Infrastructure Corporation
- Haryana State Industrial and Infrastructure Development Corporation
- Bangalore Development Authority
- Uttar Pradesh Expressways Industrial Development Authority
