= State Highway 17 (Bihar) =

Road in Bihar, India

State Highway 17

Route information
- Maintained by Bihar State Road Development Corporation (BSRDC)

Major junctions
- North end: Chausa (Buxar district)
- South end: Sasaram (Rohtas district)

Location
- Country: India
- State: Bihar

Highway system
- Roads in India; Expressways; National; State; Asian; State Highways in Bihar

State Highway 17 (SH-17) is a state highway in Bihar state. It covers two major districts (Buxar district and Rohtas district) of Bihar state. This state highway starts from Chausa and ends at Sasaram.

In Bihar, it is known as the Buxar-Chausa-Sasaram road.

== Route ==
The route of SH-17 from north to south direction is as follows:

- Chausa
- Rajpur
- Kochas
- Sasaram
