= State Highway 2 (Bihar) =

Road in Bihar, India

State Highway 2

Route information
- Maintained by Bihar State Road Development Corporation (BSRDC)

Major junctions
- North end: Bihta (Patna district)
- South end: Mahabali Pur (Patna district)

Location
- Country: India
- State: Bihar

Highway system
- Roads in India; Expressways; National; State; Asian; State Highways in Bihar

State Highway 2 (SH-2) is a state highway in Bihar state. It covers only one districts i.e. Patna district of Bihar state. This state highway starts from Raghopur village near Bihta and ends at NH-139 near Mahabali Pur village.

Mahabali Pur is situated 8 km, west of Paliganj. In Bihar, it is known as Bikram-Bihta Road.

== Route ==
The route of SH-2 from north to south is as follows:

- Raghopur (Bihta)
- Datiyana
- Bikram
- Dulhin Bazar
- Paliganj (SH-69 junction)
- Mahabali Pur (NH-139 junction)
- Sone River
