= National Highway 139 (India) =

National highway in India

National Highway 139
- National Highway 139 is shown in red on the map.

Route information
- Length: 339 km (211 mi)

Major junctions
- North end: Mehsi, Bihar
- NH 27 Mehsi
- South end: Medininagar (Daltonganj), Jharkhand

Location
- Country: India
- States: Bihar, Jharkhand
- Primary destinations: Mehsi; Parsouninath; Vaishali; Sonpur; Patna; Arwal; Daudnagar; Aurangabad; Hariharganj; Chhatarpur; Medininagar

Highway system
- Roads in India; Expressways; National; State; Asian
← NH 138	→ NH 527C

National Highway 139 (NH 139) is a national highway in India, which passes through Bihar and Jharkhand. NH-139 connects Medininagar (Daltonganj) in Jharkhand to Mehsi in Bihar. This 339-kilometre-long (211 mi) highway passes through Arwal, Daudnagar, Aurangabad & Chhatarpur.

== Route & Junctions ==
The route of NH-122A from north to south direction is as follows:

Bihar

- NH 527C at Mehsi
- NH 122A at Mehsi
- NH 722 at Saraiya
- NH 922 at Phulwari Sharif (Patna)
- SH 78 at Naubatpur
- SH 2 at Bikram
- NH 33 at Arwal
- NH 120 at Daudnagar
- NH 19 at Aurangabad

Jharkhand

- Hariharganj
- Chhatarpur
- Padwa
- NH 39 at Medininagar (Daltonganj)

== See also ==
- List of national highways in India
- National Highways Development Project
- Transport in Bihar
