= State Highway 15 (Bihar) =

Road in Bihar, India

State Highway 15

Route information
- Maintained by Bihar State Road Development Corporation (BSRDC)
- Length: 20 km (12 mi)

Major junctions
- North end: Nasriganj (Rohtas district)
- South end: Dehri-on-Sone (Rohtas district)

Location
- Country: India
- State: Bihar

Highway system
- Roads in India; Expressways; National; State; Asian; State Highways in Bihar

State Highway 15 (SH-15) is a state highway in Bihar state. It covers only one districts i.e. Rohtas district of Bihar state. This state highway starts from Nasriganj near Daudnagar and ends at NH-19 near Dehri-on-Sone. The Dehri-on-Sone is situated between Sasaram and Aurangabad.

== Route ==
The route of SH-15 from north to south direction is as follows:

- Nasriganj
- Amiyawar
- Ayar Kotha (Rohtas)
- Makrain (Rohtas)

Note:

- from Dehri-on-Sone, national highway NH-19 move west towards Sasaram.
- from Dehri-on-Sone, national highway NH-19 move east towards Aurangabad.
