= National Highway 319 (India) =

National highway in India

National Highway 319
- Map of National Highway 319 in red

Route information
- Auxiliary route of NH 19
- Length: 117 km (73 mi)

Major junctions
- East end: Arrah (Bhojpur)
- West end: Mohania (Kaimur)

Location
- Country: India
- States: Bihar
- Primary destinations: Dinara – Charpokhari

Highway system
- Roads in India; Expressways; National; State; Asian
← NH 19	→ NH 922

National Highway 319 (NH 319) is a National Highway in India. This highway connects NH-922 in Arrah (Bhojpur district) to NH-19 in Mohania (Kaimur district) in the state of Bihar. The NH-319 passes through Jagdishpur and Dinara.

== Route ==
The NH-319 is also known as Arrah-Mohania road. It passes from following route from east to west direction:

- Gidha, Arrah
- Ara Junction
- Zero mile, Arrah
- Jagdishpur
- Malyabag
- Dinara
- Kochas
- Mohania

== Junctions ==
- NH 922 at Gidha, Arrah
- SH 12 at Zero mile, Arrah
- SH 102 at Jagdishpur
- NH 120 at Malyabag
- SH 15 at Dinara
- SH 17 at Kochas
- NH 19 at Mohania
