= Outer Ring Road, Patna =

Proposed expressway in India

Route information
- Length: 140 km (87 mi)

Location
- Country: India
- States: Bihar

Highway system
- Roads in India; Expressways; National; State; Asian

The Outer Ring Road is a proposed 140 kilometer, 6-lane ring road expressway encircling the capital city of Patna, Bihar, India.

== History ==
The area of Patna SCR (State Capital Region) will be spread over three districts of Patna, Vaishali and Saran district with this 4/6 lane highway project which has a length of 140 km and cost of 4800 crore. The expanses of Patna city will also reach the north of the Ganges river. Not only this, the way to spread the city of Patna on both sides of the Gandak river will open. It has been instructed to finalize the southern part of its DPR Ganga by July 31, 2019 and the northern part till September 15, 2019.

== Route map ==
The new alignment of Patna Ring Road from Kanhauli-Naubatpur-Ramnagar-Kachchi Dargarh-Bidupur-Chaksikander crossing the Sarai NH-77 and SH-74 towards the north of the city of Hajipur, then crossing the Gandak river, NH-19, Dighwara (NH-131G) There will be a new bridge on the Ganges River from Sherpur to Kanohali.

== Timeline ==
- August 2017: Bihar Government approved Patna outer ring road.
- October 2018: Central Government approved Patna outer ring road.

== Patna inner ring road ==
There is also DPR proposed for 65-km Patna inner ring road that includes a bridge between Dighwara in Saran district to Sherpur in Patna district and Kanhauli to Lakhna in Bihta-Sarmera road. The proposed alignment Patna ring road project is Bihta- Naubatpur- Dumri- Daniyawa- Kachchi Dargah- Bidupur- Hajipur- Sonepur- Digha- Bihta.

== See also ==
- Expressways in Bihar
- Expressways in Chhattisgarh
- Expressways in India
- Loknayak Ganga Path
- Digha–Sonpur Bridge
- Kacchi Dargah-Bidupur Bridge
- Patna–Digha Ghat line
