= Kurkuri, Bhojpur =

Kurkuri
- Village
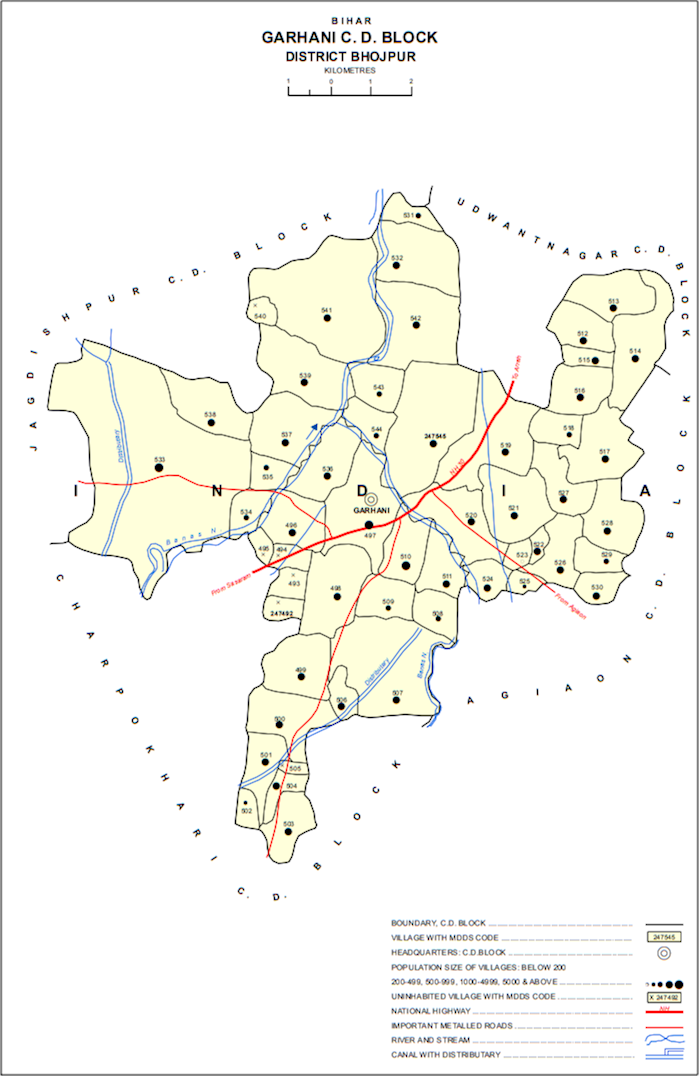
- Map of Kurkuri (#514) in Garhani block

- Location in Bihar, India Kurkuri (India)
- Coordinates: 25.44416°N 84.61717°E
- Country: India
- State: Bihar
- District: Bhojpur

Area
  - Total: 0.281 km^{2} (0.108 sq mi)
- Elevation: 72 m (236 ft)

Population (2011)
  - Total: 3,562
  - Density: 12,700/km^{2} (32,800/sq mi)

Languages
  - Official: Bhojpuri, Hindi
- Time zone: UTC+5:30 (IST)

Kurkuri is a village in Garhani block of Bhojpur district, Bihar, India. As of 2011, its population was 3,562, in 610 households.
