= Rampur, Garhani =

Rampur Rāmpur
- Village
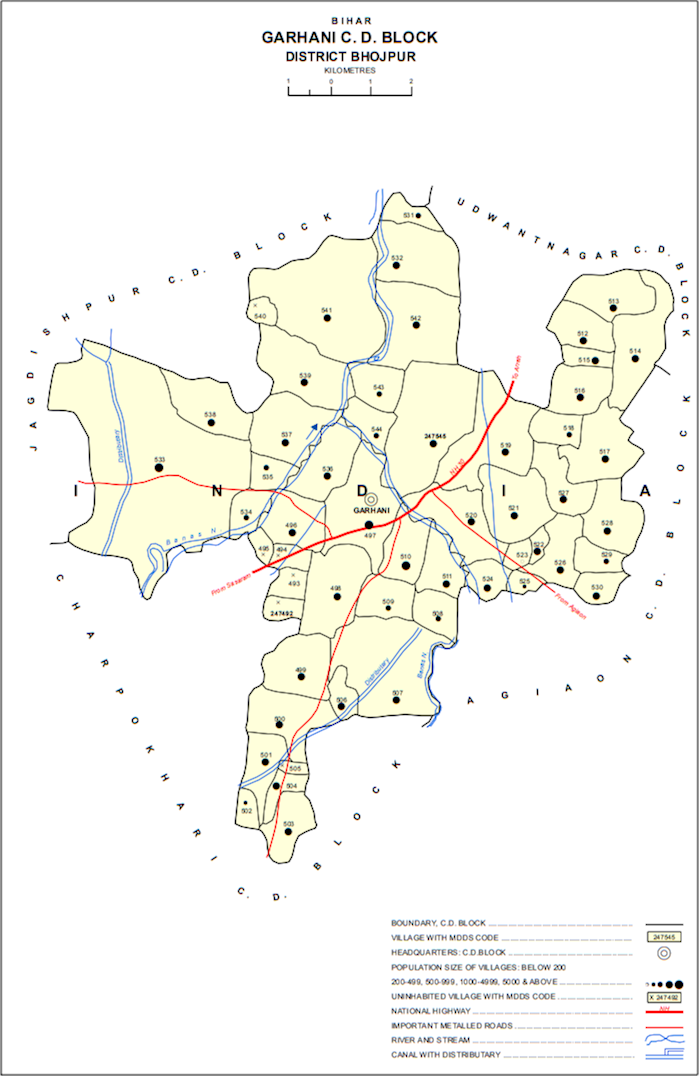
- Map of Rampur (#517) in Garhani block

- Location in Bihar, India Rampur (India)
- Coordinates: 25.42145°N 84.60474°E
- Country: India
- State: Bihar
- District: Bhojpur

Area
  - Total: 0.257 km^{2} (0.099 sq mi)
- Elevation: 70 m (230 ft)

Population (2011)
  - Total: 3,170
  - Density: 12,300/km^{2} (31,900/sq mi)

Languages
  - Official: Bhojpuri, Hindi
- Time zone: UTC+5:30 (IST)

Rampur is a village in Garhani block of Bhojpur district, Bihar, India. As of 2011, its population was 3,170, in 416 households.

== See also ==
- Other places with name Rampur
