= Morasiya =

Morasiya Morasia
- Village
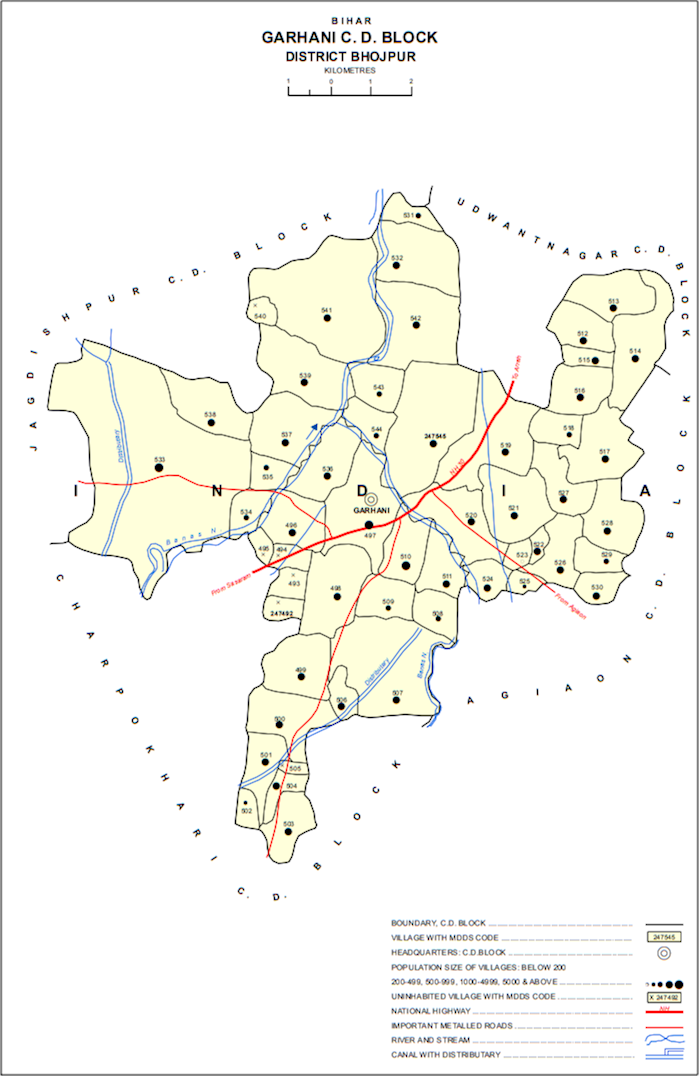
- Map of Morasiya (#538) in Garhani block

- Location in Bihar, India Morasiya (India)
- Coordinates: 25.43052°N 84.51098°E
- Country: India
- State: Bihar
- District: Bhojpur

Area
  - Total: 0.206 km^{2} (0.080 sq mi)
- Elevation: 72 m (236 ft)

Population (2011)
  - Total: 1,796
  - Density: 8,720/km^{2} (22,600/sq mi)

Languages
  - Official: Bhojpuri, Hindi
- Time zone: UTC+5:30 (IST)
- PIN: 802203

Morasiya, also spelled Morasia, is a village and in Garhani block of Bhojpur district, in Bihar, India. As of 2011, its population was 1,796, in 255 households.

Morasiya is an impoverished village, with most villagers being employed in agriculture and a few being migrant workers. The population is mostly Yadavs and Rajputs. The village has three neighbourhoods, Matthiya to the east and Sridhar ka Tola to the west and Ayar to the north. The houses in Matthiya are made of bricks and cement, while those in Sridhar ka Tola are made of mud and clay. Electricity is available for 15–17 hours per day throughout the year. Drinking water is provided via hand pumps, which are installed in every house. Every house additionally has proper sanitation facilities, although a few villagers prefer open defecation instead. Morasiya has one primary school.

Healthcare in Morasiya is poor. The village lacks an Accredited Social Health Activist, and the nearest Primary Health Centre is 8 km (5.0 mi) away. A majority of children in Morasiya suffer from skin diseases, especially in the summer, including pyoderma, scabies, and atopic dermatitis.
