= Sarthua, Bhojpur =

Village in Bhojpur district, Bihar, India

Sarthua सरथुआ
- Village
- Location in Bihar, India Sarthua (India)
- Coordinates: 25.5034°N 84.5937°E
- Country: India
- State: Bihar
- District: Bhojpur
- Block: Udwantnagar

Area
  - Total: 8.67 km^{2} (3.35 sq mi)

Population (2011)
  - Total: 6,363

Languages
  - Official: Hindi
- Time zone: UTC+5:30 (IST)

Sarthua is a village in Udwantnagar block of Bhojpur district in the Indian state of Bihar. According to the 2011 census of India, it had a population of 6,363 in 1,089 households.

== Geography ==
The village covers an area of 867 ha (8.67 km^{2}). It lies in the plains of the Bhojpur district, south-west of the district headquarters, Arrah.

== Demographics ==
As of the 2011 census, Sarthua had 6,363 inhabitants, of whom 3,289 were male and 3,074 female, a sex ratio of 935 females per 1,000 males. Children aged 0–6 numbered 1,296. Scheduled Castes made up 2,402 people (37.75%) and there was no Scheduled Tribe population.

3,257 people were literate (2,061 male and 1,196 female), a literacy rate of 64.28% among people aged seven and above.

Of the 2,375 workers, 1,118 were main workers and 1,257 marginal workers. Among main workers, 574 were cultivators and 225 agricultural labourers.

== Land records ==
For land revenue purposes Sarthua is a mauza with revenue thana number 218 in the Udwantnagar circle (anchal). Its land was recorded in the Cadastral Survey of the early 20th century and the later Revisional Survey, whose khatiyan (records of rights) are the basis of the village's land records.
