= Koilwar =

Indian town in Bhojpur district, Bihar

Koilwar कोइलवर
- town
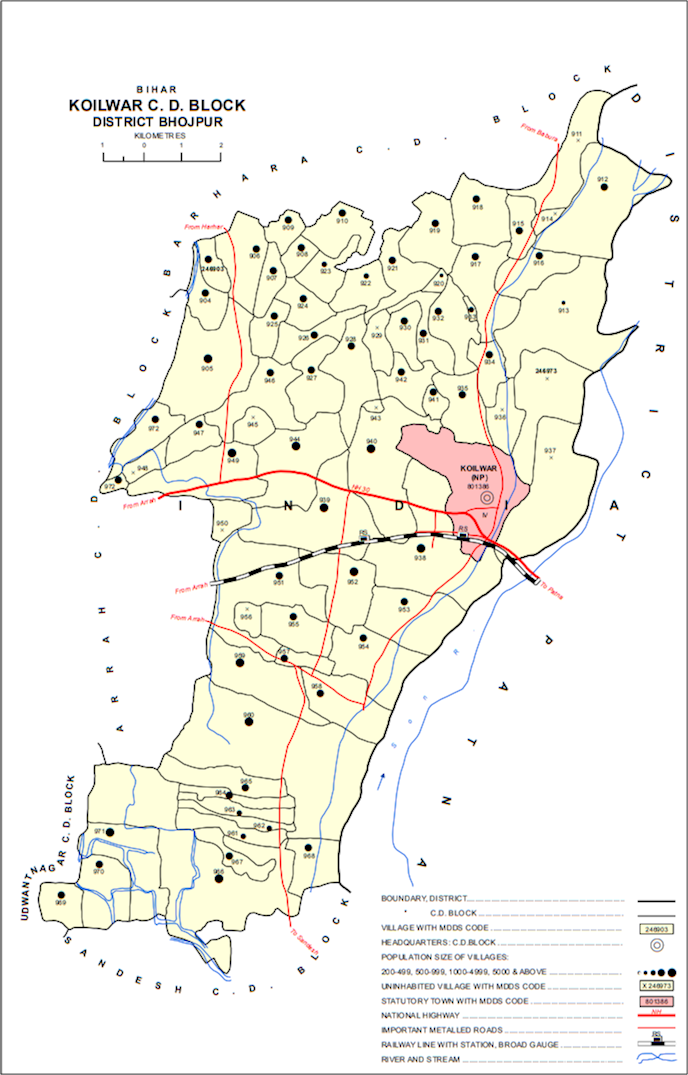
- Map of Koilwar block

- Location in Bihar, India Koilwar (India)
- Coordinates: 25°34′40″N 84°47′40″E
- Country: India
- State: Bihar
- District: Bhojpur

Area
  - Total: 5.6 km^{2} (2.2 sq mi)

Population (2011)
  - Total: 17,725
  - Density: 3,200/km^{2} (8,200/sq mi)

Languages
  - Official: Bhojpuri, Hindi
- Time zone: UTC+5:30 (IST)
- Postal code: 802160
- ISO 3166 code: IN-BR
- Website: bhojpur.bih.nic.in

Koilwar or Koelwar or Koilawar (Hindi: कोइलवर) is a nagar panchayat (town) and one of the 14 community development block in Bhojpur district in the Indian state of Bihar. As of 2011, the population of Koilwar town was 17,725, in 2,893 households. Koilwar lies on the Arrah-Patna highway (NH-922).

== Geography ==
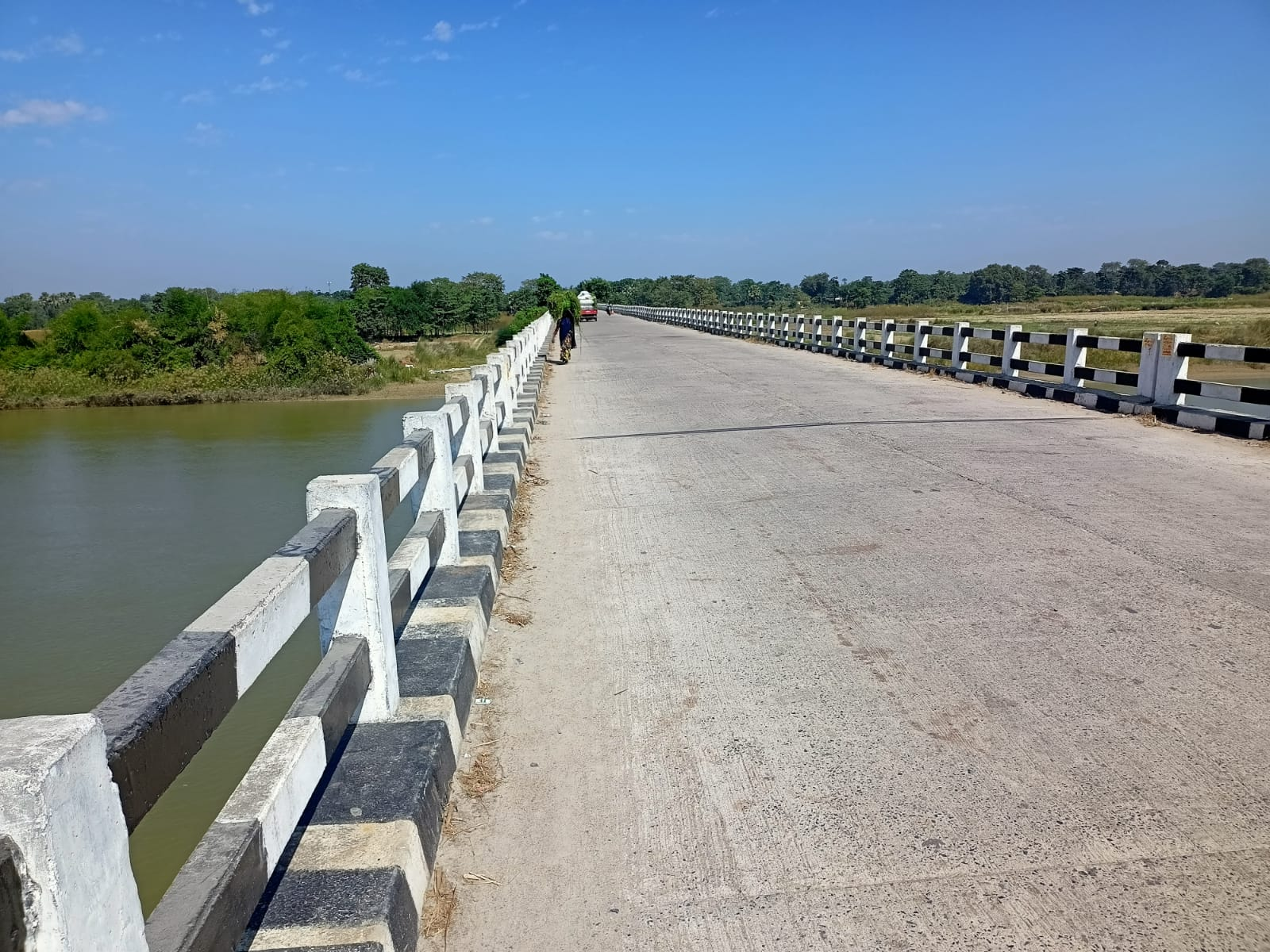
A bridge near Koilwar, Patna-Arrah highway.

Koilwar is located at 25°34′N 84°47′E. It has an average elevation of 39 metres (128 ft).

Koilwar is situated on the banks of Sone river, between Arrah and Bihta in Bihar

== Koilwar Bridge ==
Koilwar Bridge is situated on the River Sone; its steel rail road bridge called as Abdul Bari Bridge made before independence, is shown in the film Gandhi. The Koelwar bridge across the Sone river was built by the British in 1862. A two lane road (NH-922) runs just under the rail tracks. Sand mining near the pillars of this old bridge has created structural problems recently.

A famous Shiv Temple is the moonlight of the village. On every 14 January and on the eve of Mahashivratri a fair takes place near the temple.

== Demographics ==
Historical population
Year	Pop.	±%
1981	7,936	—
1991	10,253	+29.2%
2001	19,928	+94.4%
2011	17,725	−11.1%
Source: 2011 Census of India

In the 2001 India census, Koilwar had a population of 19,925. Males constitute 61% of the population and females 39%. Koilwar has an average literacy rate of 55%, lower than the national average of 59.5%. Male literacy is 55%, female literacy 54%. 19% of the population is under 6 years of age.

== Economy ==
The main commodities produced in Koilwar are paneer and tilkut.

== Transport ==
The Koilwar town is very well connected by roads, highways and Rail routes to various cities like Patna, Danapur, Bihta, Arrah, Buxar, Chhapra in Bihar; and Ghazipur, Mughalsarai and Varanasi in Uttar Pradesh.

=== Roads ===
- Patna-Arrah-Buxar (NH-922)
- Arrah-Chhapra Bridge
- Sakaddi-Nasriganj (SH-81)

=== Railway ===
- Koilwar railway station: KWR (0 km)
- Arrah Junction (14 km)
- Bihta railway station (8 km)
- Patna Junction railway station (35 km)

=== Airway ===
- Patna Airport (36 km)
- Bihta Airport (14 km)

== List of villages ==
The list of 68 villages in Koilwar Block (under Arrah Tehsil) is as follows: (GP is Gram Panchayat).

Village name	Land area (hectares)	Population (in 2011)
Amma Narbirpur	474	1,945
Babhnauli	29	464
Bahiyara	280	2,250
Bakar Nagar	78	0
Bhadwar (GP)	266	7,807
Bhagwatpur	87	1,792
Bhopatpur	58	1,001
Birampur (GP)	527	5,907
Bishunpur	159	2,128
Bishunpura	107	1,536
Chanda (GP)	191	2,804
Chandi	347	5,953
Chandwa	66	1,672
Chhitampur	134	0
Daulatpur (GP)	220	3,568
Deoria	116	806
Dhandiha (GP)	973	7139
Dumaria	84	1,398
Farhangpur	331	3,119
Giddha (GP)	393	5,634
Golakpur	137	1,778
Gopalpur (GP)	84	1,753
Guri	117	865
Gyanpur	192	2,841
Haripur	121	2,859
Imadpur	65	0
Jahanpur	223	1,934
Jalpura	115	1,071
Jalpura Tapa (GP)	1,107	12,168
Jamalpur	197	4,876
Jokta (GP)	286	6,378
Kaem Nagar (GP)	400	8,554
Kamalu Chak	31	0
Kazi Chak	40	1,669
Khangaon (GP)	1,123	10,711
Khesrahiya (GP)	93	1,490
Kiratpura	266	4,999
Kishunpura	136	2,165
Kosihan	83	913
Kulharia (GP)	417	7,201
Lodipur	178	1,753
Mahui	624	378
Majhauwan	145	1,336
Makhdumpur	316	0
Makhdumpur Semra	483	1,179
Mana Chak	40	979
Manikpur	217	3,859
Manpur	72	822
Mathurapur (GP)	153	2,126
Milki	76	0
Mirapur	102	0
Mohaddi Chak	170	2,472
Mohkampur	223	1,429
Mokhalsa	206	3,108
Narbirpur (GP)	73	4,616
Narhi	166	3,909
Pachaina	108	1,971
Pachrukhia	119	2,214
Purdilganj	100	1,279
Rajapur (GP)	236	3,043
Raundh Santpur	87	0
Sadasibpur Urf Sabdalpur	368	0
Sakaddi (GP)	506	8,294
Sirari Chak	66	0
Sirpalpur	86	1,269
Sirpalpur	134	2,140
Songhatta	266	2,849
Sundarpur	140	963
Sundra	128	1,314
Suraudha	546	0
