= Mani, Bihar =

Village in Bihar, India

Mani
- village
- Location in Bihar, India Mani (India)
- Coordinates: 25.085°N 84.148°E
- Country: India
- State: Bihar

Area
  - Total: 5.58 km^{2} (2.15 sq mi)

Population
  - Total: 4,455
  - Density: 798/km^{2} (2,070/sq mi)

Languages
  - Official: Bhojpuri, Hindi
- Time zone: UTC+5:30 (IST)
- Postal code: 802212
- ISO 3166 code: IN-BR

Mani is a village near Bikramganj, in the Rohtas district of Bihar state, India. The total population of the village is 4,455 as per 2011 Census of India, spread across 558 hectares. The population is roughly equally divided between male and female, with a male population of 2,321 and a female population of 2,134.

The area of the village is divided into multiple tolas, that collectively hold more than 700 households. The village is located on the banks of Kao river and is 10km from the sub-district headquarters Bikramganj (tehsildar office). The village is also 40km away from the district headquarters Sasaram.

The overall literacy rate of the village is 64.40%, with the male and female literary rates standing at 72.68% males and 55.39% respectively.

== Gram Panchayat ==
Mani is a Gram panchayat with 4 villages and 14 wards in it. The list of villages include:

- Lachhmanpur
- Keshodih
- Mani
- Ramna Dihra

== Connectivity ==
Mani is connected with nearby cities via roads and railway lines, including the Ara–Sasaram DEMU, connecting it to Sasaram and Arrah. The Kao River is also used for transportation.
