= Dubauli, Garhani =

Dubauli
- Village
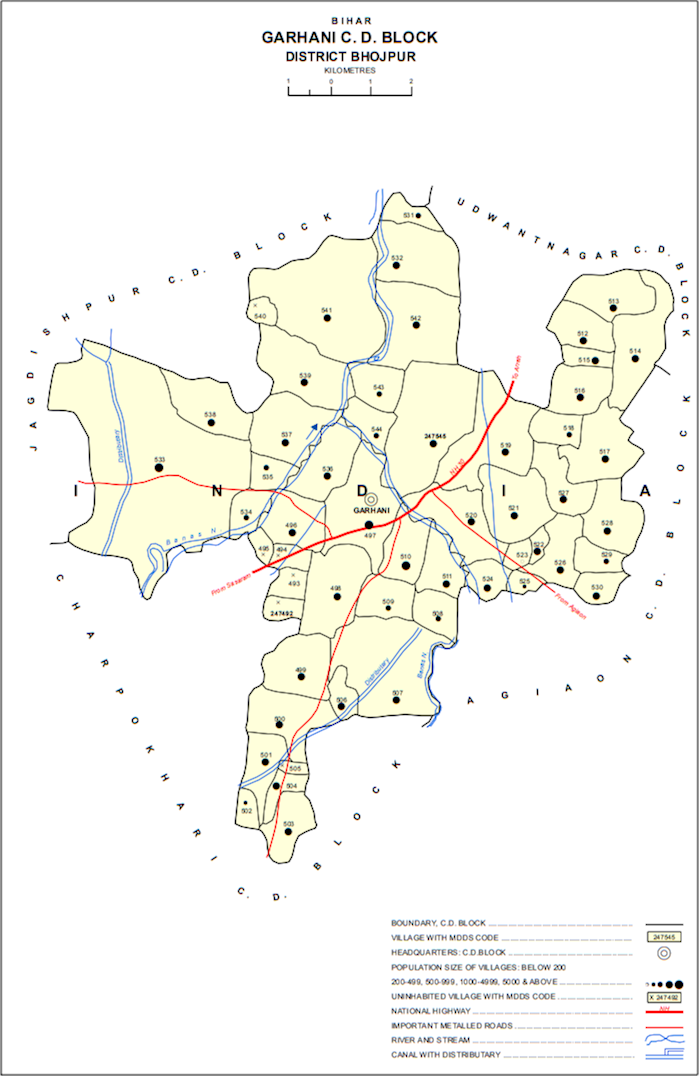
- Map of Dubauli (#515) in Garhani block

- Location in Bihar, India Dubauli (India)
- Coordinates: 25.43974°N 84.59921°E
- Country: India
- State: Bihar
- District: Bhojpur

Area
  - Total: 0.076 km^{2} (0.029 sq mi)
- Elevation: 70 m (230 ft)

Population (2011)
  - Total: 1,017
  - Density: 13,000/km^{2} (35,000/sq mi)

Languages
  - Official: Bhojpuri, Hindi
- Time zone: UTC+5:30 (IST)

Dubauli is a village in Garhani block of Bhojpur district, Bihar, India. As of 2011, its population was 1,017, in 158 households.
