= Pratyaya Amrit =

Chief Secretary of Bihar

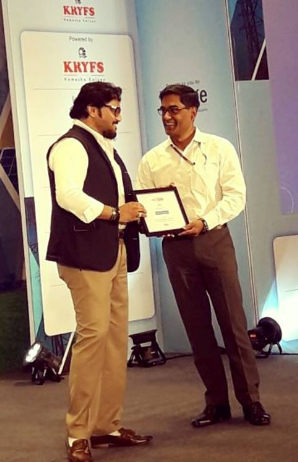

Chief Secretary of Bihar
- Incumbent
- Assumed office 1 September 2025
- Appointed by: Government of Bihar
- Chief Minister: Nitish Kumar; Samrat Choudhary
- Preceded by: Amrit Lal Meena

Personal details
- Born: 7 July 1967 (age 59) Gopalganj, Bihar, India
- Spouse: Ratna
- Education: Hindu College, Delhi University of Delhi
- Occupation: Bureaucrat
- Known for: IAS officer who carried out electrification work of villages, streamlining the functioning of the electricity department and building roads and bridges in Bihar
- Awards: Prime Minister's Award for Excellence Public Administration

Pratyaya Amrit (7 July 1967) is an Indian Administrative Service officer from Bihar cadre who is now serving as the Chief Secretary of Bihar. Known for streamlining the functioning of the electricity department and building roads and bridges in Bihar for which he got Prime Minister's Award for Excellence in Public Administration.

== Early life and education ==
Amrit's father Ripusudan Srivastava was a professor of philosophy in Baba Saheb Bhimrao Ambedkar Bihar University and Vice Chancellor in Bhupendra Narayan Mandal University while his mother Kavita Verma was also a professor. He hails from Gopalganj, Bihar. He has a sister, Pragya Richa who is an IPS and posted as DG Police in Madhya Pradesh. His elder brother Pratik Priyadarshi is an associate professor and Chairperson of the IBM programme in BIMTECH, Greater Noida. Pratyaya completed his graduation from Hindu College, University of Delhi. He did his post graduation in ancient history and was topper in Delhi University. Amrit was offered a lecturer's job in Sri Venkateswara College, New Delhi. Later, Amrit cleared the UPSC Civil Service exams with history and psychology in IAS position in his second attempt.

== Career ==
Pratyaya is a 1991 batch IAS officer of the Bihar Cadre. He implemented a public-private-partnership for the district hospital as the DM of Katihar. He put an end to sleaze shows at the famous Sonpur Cattle Fair by making it compulsory for CCTVs to be installed in theatres as DM of Chhapra. Pratyaya learnt Santali, a tribal language during his IAS probation in Dumka (now in Jharkhand). Amrit busted gambling rackets in far-flung villages as Sub-Divisional Magistrate in Simdega. Amrit was on central deputation in New Delhi from November 2001 to April 2006, but he cut it short six months before the scheduled deadline to work in Bihar. He is also a mentor at Vision India Foundation, a New Delhi-based think tank working on public leadership amongst youth.

In 2020, he was appointed as the principal secretary of Bihar health department. He is currently serving as the Chief Secretary of Bihar from 1 September 2025 onwards.

== Bihar Rajya Pul Nirman Nigam ==
Pratyaya Amrit was the first IAS officer to head Bihar Rajya Pul Nirman Nigam Ltd (BRPNN)- a corporation formed on 11 June 1975, and was on the verge of liquidation when he took over. He worked in the area of road construction in BRPNN as Bihar Road Construction Secretary. He took over as managing director of Bihar Rajya Pul Nirman Nigam in 2006. Amrit was made managing director of Bihar State Road Development Corporation in February 2011 and made the organisation adopt abandoned girls.

== Bihar State Power Holding Company Limited ==
Pratyaya was made the Chairman & Managing Director of Bihar State Power Holding Company Limited in June 2014. He completed rural electrification of 39,073 revenue villages in Bihar. Pratyaya was promoted to the rank of Principal Secretary of Energy department from Energy Secretary in February 2016. He has completed the task of 100% electrification in bihar in November 2018. Now Pratyaya has been focusing on renewable energy sources and steps have been taken to build solar power plant.

== Personal life ==
Pratyaya Amrit married his fellow Delhi University classmate Ratna. The couple has a daughter and a son. Daughter, Apoorva Srivastava has completed her graduation in Law from National Law Institute University, Bhopal and Son, Anshumat Srivastava, who has won the all India Tennis Championship in April 2010, and has studied at Bryant University, USA.

== Awards ==
Pratyaya Amrit was only IAS officer in India that Government of India picked in 2011 in the individual category for the Prime Minister's Excellence Award in Public Administration. The facilitation certificate reads "Bridging the gap: For turning around a dying Bihar State Bridge Construction Corporation into a profit-making unit."
