= Ghusia Kalan =

- village
- Location in Bihar, India Ghusia Kalan (India)
- Coordinates: 25.101°N 84.096°E
- Country: India
- State: Bihar

Languages
  - Official: Bhojpuri, Hindi
- Time zone: UTC+5:30 (IST)
- Postal code: 802212
- ISO 3166 code: IN-BR

Ghusia Kalan is a village near Bikramganj, in Rohtas district of Bihar state, India. Ghusia Kalan is the official name of this Village. "Sadhu ji ke Kutiya" Cottage is famous in this village. Sadhu or saint lives here. Sitting here, many people laugh and joke. Also Cottage is famous place for picnic spot among the youths. It is very crowded on 1 January. People gather here in huge numbers. People from other villages come to visit on 1 January. Usually students from nearby areas come here to visit. Various types of trees and flowers are also planted here which helps in making the Cottage beautiful. The "Kao" River passes through this village. The "Kao" river divides this village into two parts, first Ghusia Kalan and second "Ghusia Kala Bal". Hindu Muslims live happily with each other. There is a Canal in this village which helps in farming. This village is well connected by Railway line. It is well connected by road also. There is weekly market, which provides very cheap commodities and vegetable. There are also good "temples" and "mosques" in this village. This village is famous for paddy cultivation.

The management of Kutiya is controlled by groups of Pal peoples.
