= Kaup, Bhojpur =

Kaup Kāup
- Village
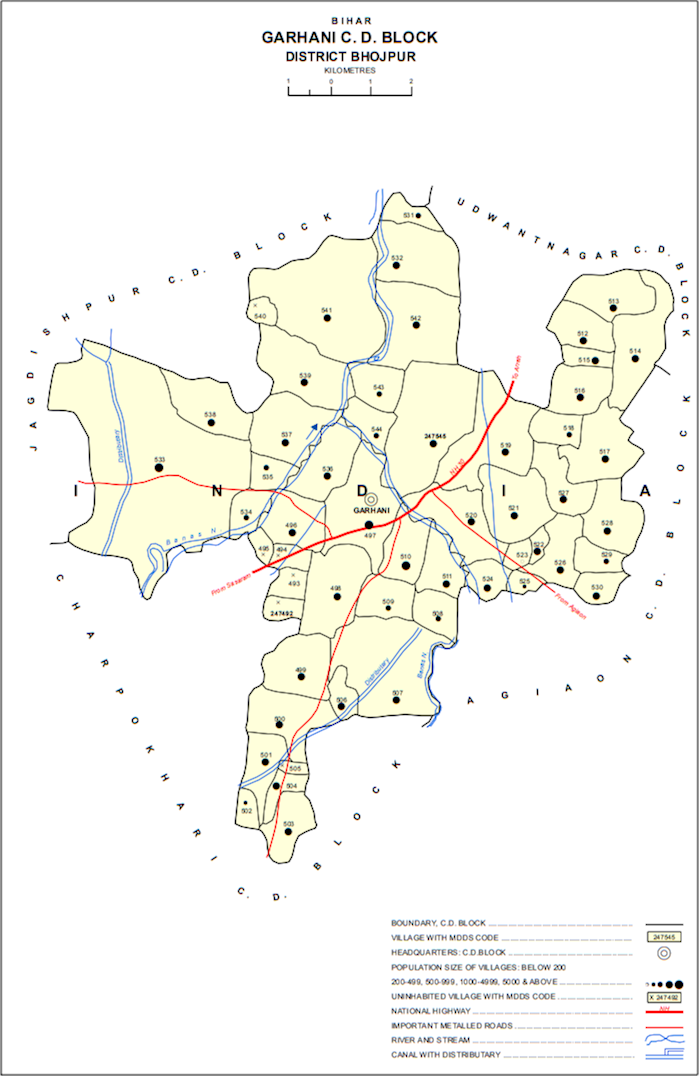
- Map of Kaup (#507) in Garhani block

- Location in Bihar, India Kaup (India)
- Coordinates: 25.37822°N 84.5546°E
- Country: India
- State: Bihar
- District: Bhojpur

Area
  - Total: 0.557 km^{2} (0.215 sq mi)
- Elevation: 76 m (249 ft)

Population (2011)
  - Total: 4,958
  - Density: 8,900/km^{2} (23,100/sq mi)

Languages
  - Official: Bhojpuri, Hindi
- Time zone: UTC+5:30 (IST)

Kaup is a village in Garhani block of Bhojpur district, Bihar, India. As of 2011, its population was 4,958, in 740 households.
