= Amauna, Rohtas =

Amauna
- village
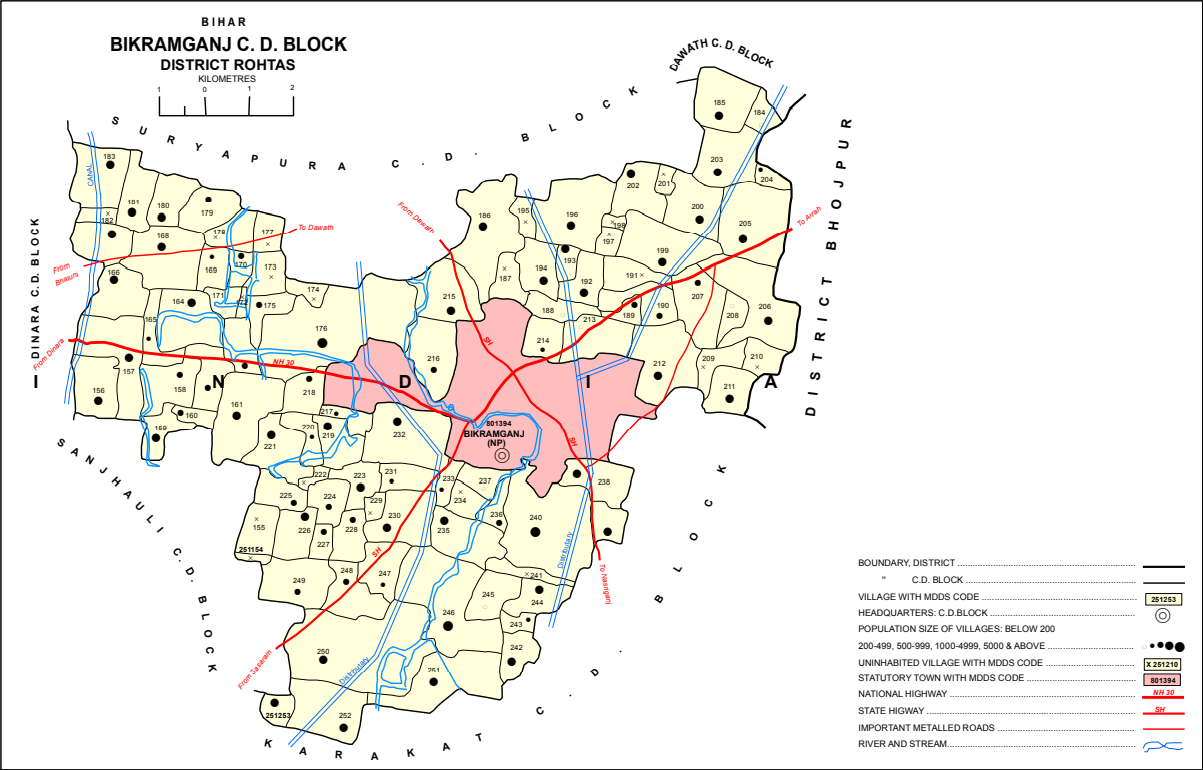
- Map showing Amauna (#165) in Bikramganj block
- Country: India
- State: Bihar
- District: Rohtas

Population (2011)
  - Total: 270

Languages
  - Official: Hindi
- Time zone: UTC+5:30 (IST)

Amauna is a village located in the Bikramganj Block of Rohtas district in the Indian state of Bihar.
