= Gara, Rohtas =

Gara
- Location in Bihar, India
- Coordinates: 25°15′04″N 83°56′00″E
- Country: India
- State: Bihar
- Division: Patna
- District: Rohtas

Government
  - Type: Gram Panchayat
  - Body: Gara Gram Panchayat

Area
  - Total: 3.87 km^{2} (1.49 sq mi)
- Elevation: 92 m (302 ft)

Population (2011)
  - Total: 3,280

Language
  - Unofficial: Bhojpuri
- Time zone: UTC+5:30 (IST)
- PIN Code: 821112
- Telephone Code: +91-6184
- Vehicle registration: BR-24

Gara is a village in Rohtas district of Bihar state, India. It is located in Kochas community development block.The total geographical area of Gara is 3.87 KM^{2}. Gara village is a gram panchayat.The nearest police station is Kochas Police station. Gara is part of Kargahar vidhan sabha seat of State Assembly and Sasaram Lok Sabha constituency.

== Demographics ==
As of 2011 India census, Gara had a population of 3280. Males constitute 1720 citizens and females 1560. 16.86% of the population is under 6 years of age.There are 532 households in Gara.

The 2011 census recorded the village of Gara as having a literacy rate of 68.61%, with an 21.15% gap between male literacy (78.01%) and female literacy (57.86%). The literacy rate of Kochas block which encompasses Gara is 75.24%, somewhat higher than the Rohtas district rate of 73.37%.

The village of Gara exhibits an average sex ratio of 907, a figure that falls slightly below the average for the state of Bihar, which stands at 918. This indicates a marginally lower proportion of females to males in Gara compared to the broader state context. The census reports a child sex ratio of 1.087 in Gara, a figure that significantly surpasses the Bihar state average of 935.

== Employment ==
Agriculture is the main occupation in the village of Gara. A significant portion of the total population, precisely 893 individuals, were actively participating in various work activities. A substantial majority, 98.77%, classified their occupation as 'Main Work', defined as employment or an income source for a duration exceeding six months. Conversely, a marginal 1.23% were engaged in activities that provided livelihood for less than six months.

Further analysis of the 893 individuals involved in Main Work revealed that 275 were cultivators, either owning or co-owning their land. In contrast, 506 individuals were identified as Agricultural labourers.

== Villages in Gara Gram Panchayat ==
There are 10 villages in Gara gram panchayat.

Name of village
Anhari
Chakia
Gara
Mirga
Pauat
Shiwpur
Benipur
Chakia
Ghasa
Panditpura

== Connectivity ==
Gara is connected by road to nearby major towns and cities.Buxar-Sasaram road is situated 2.2 km from the village.Buxar is the nearest railway station located 39 km away from Gara.Varanasi airport is located 150 km from the village.

== Culture ==
Gara's native language is Bhojpuri.The cultural tapestry of this locale is richly woven with the vibrant threads of Bhojpuri festivals and culinary traditions. The gastronomic repertoire is a symphony of flavours, featuring such delicacies as Litti-Chokha, a dish of stuffed wheat balls and spiced potatoes, and Makuni, a paratha filled with roasted gram flour.

The festivals celebrated here are Holi, Durgapuja, Chhath, Diwali, Jitiya, Govardhan Puja, Rakshabandhan etc.

== Amenities ==
The village has a post office run by India Post. It has a Bank run by Dakshin Bihar Gramin Bank. Gara also houses a government 10+2 High school which runs on BSEB curriculum.

Temple of deity "Chandi mata" is the primary place worship in the village.
