= Chatarpur block =

Chatarpur
- Block

- Location in jharkhand, India Chatarpur (India)
- Coordinates: 24.37°N 84.19°E
- Country: India
- State: Jharkhand
- District: Palamu
- Block: Chatarpur

Government
  - MLA: Pushpa Devi; Bharatiya Janata Party

Population (2011)
  - Total: 147,459

Languages
  - Official: Magahi, Hindi
- Time zone: UTC+5:30 (IST)
- PIN: 822113
- Vehicle registration: JH
- Website: http://palamu.nic.in/Chatarpur.html

Chatarpur or Chhatarpur is one of the administrative community development block of Palamu district, Jharkhand state, India. This is one of the important block from Jharkhand situated at National Highway 139 (old NH-98). According to census (2001), the block has 27,271 households with aggregate population of 166,843. The block has 240 villages.

== Demographics ==
Religion in Chhatarpur block (2011)
Religion	Percent
Hinduism	88.99%
Islam	10.89%
Other or not stated	0.12%

At the time of the 2011 census, Chhatarpur block had a population of 147,459. Chhatarpur block had a sex ratio of 916 females per 1000 males and a literacy rate of 57.32%: 68.54% for males and 44.95% for females. 27,565 (18.69%) were under 7 years of age. The entire population lived in rural areas. Scheduled Castes and Scheduled Tribes were 40,249 (27.30%) and 22,822 (15.48%) of the population, respectively.

Languages of Chhatarpur block (2011)
1. Hindi (51.29%)
2. Magahi (44.32%)
3. Urdu (3.37%)
4. Kurukh (0.98%)
5. Others (0.04%)

== See also ==
- Palamu Loksabha constituency
- Jharkhand Legislative Assembly
- Jharkhand
- Palamu
