= Nonhar =

- village
- Location in Bihar, India Nonhar (India)
- Coordinates: 25.225°N 84.228°E
- Country: India
- State: Bihar

Languages
  - Official: Bhojpuri, Hindi
- Time zone: UTC+5:30 (IST)
- Postal code: 802212
- ISO 3166 code: IN-BR

Nonhar is a village of Rohtas district, Bihar, India. The village has a population of about 5992, of which 3190 are males while 2802 are females, as per the Population Census 2011. The village is the origin of the Thora River, an underground river. Nonhar presents the Indian Social Culture. It has a post office, two temples, two ponds and three private schools.

Nonhar is 4 km west of Bikramganj near Dhangain and 1 km south of Surajpura.
