= Labhuani, Bhojpur =

Labhuani Labhuāni
- Village
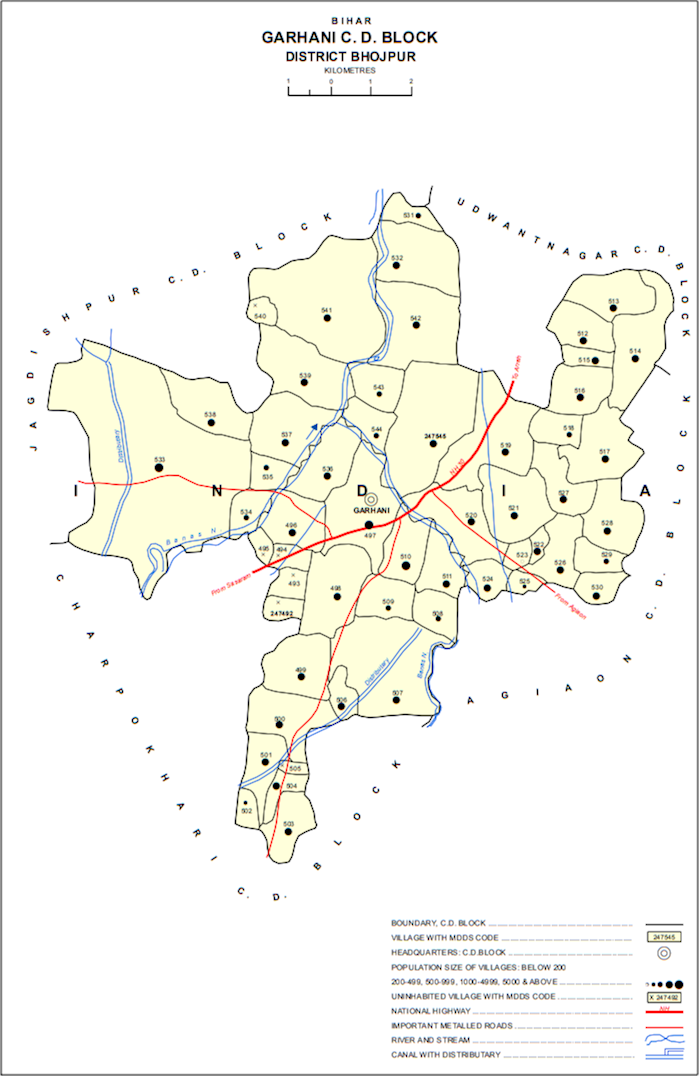
- Map of Labhuani (#516) in Garhani block

- Location in Bihar, India Labhuani (India)
- Coordinates: 25.43602°N 84.60095°E
- Country: India
- State: Bihar
- District: Bhojpur

Area
  - Total: 0.158 km^{2} (0.061 sq mi)
- Elevation: 70 m (230 ft)

Population (2011)
  - Total: 1,246
  - Density: 7,890/km^{2} (20,400/sq mi)

Languages
  - Official: Bhojpuri, Hindi
- Time zone: UTC+5:30 (IST)

Labhuani is a village in Garhani block of Bhojpur district, Bihar, India. In 2011, its population was 1,246, in 258 households.
