= Dinara, Bihar =

Dinara Dināra
- Village
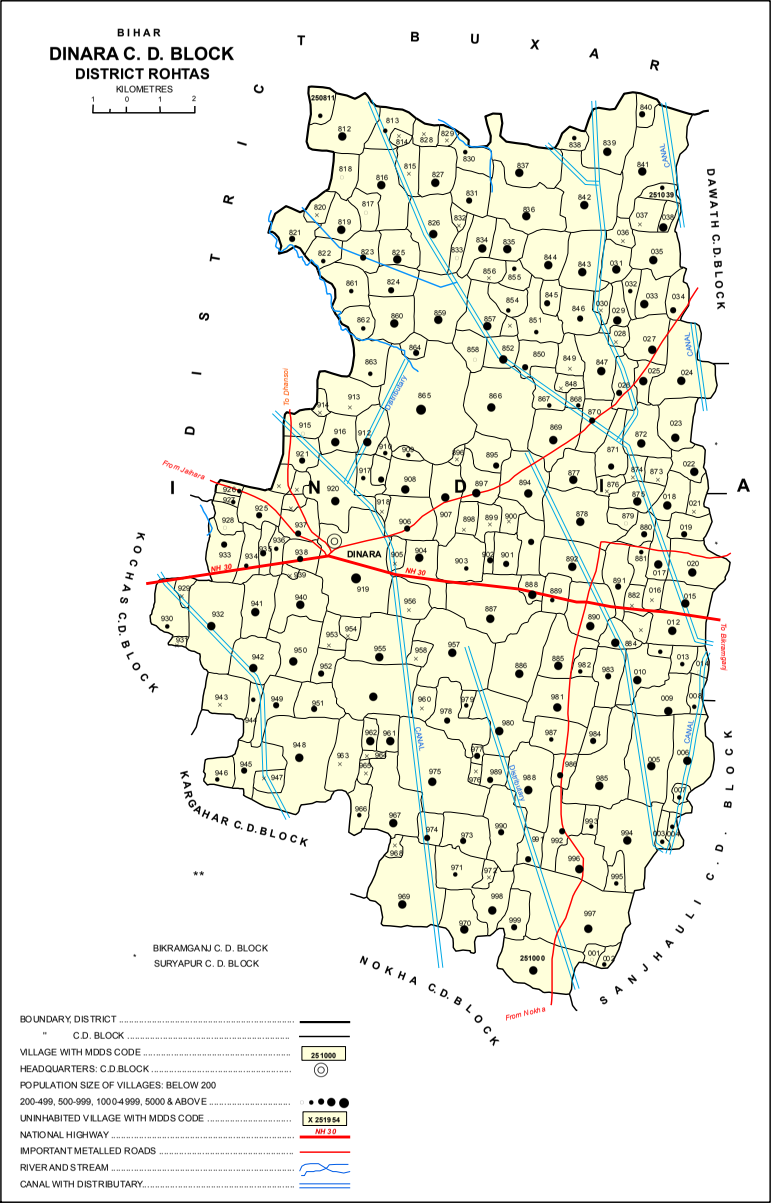

- Location in Bihar, India
- Coordinates: 25.247°N 84.063°E
- Country: India
- State: Bihar
- District: Rohtas

Area
  - Total: 5.88 km^{2} (2.27 sq mi)
- Elevation: 86 m (282 ft)

Population (2011)
  - Total: 11,733
  - Density: 2,000/km^{2} (5,170/sq mi)

Languages
  - Official: Hindi
- Time zone: UTC+5:30 (IST)
- PIN: 802213

Dinara is a CD Block in Rohtas district, Bihar, India. It is situated on the National Highway 319 (old NH-30). The birthplace of the famous poet Dariya Saheb is just 5 km from Dinara.

== Geography ==
The whole Dinara block is located on the Sasaram Plain. The block covers an area of 28,732.00 hectares, with the lands belonging to the village of Dinara itself covering 588 hectares. The block has 2 hectares of forest.

=== Land use ===
Of the block's 28,732.00 hectares, 91.33% is classified as cultivable land. Of this, 99.45% is irrigated, which is the highest proportion among blocks in Rohtas district. Of the 588 hectares in Dinara village, 508 are under cultivation, all of which are irrigated.

== Demographics ==
As of 2011, the population of Dinara was 11,733, in 1,883 households, while the overall block population was 225,468, in 33,227 households.

Historical population
Year	Pop.	±%
2001	192,291	—
2011	225,468	+17.3%
Source: 2011 Census of India

Dinara is an entirely rural sub-district, with no major urban centres. The sex ratio of Dinara sub-district in 2011 was 926, which was above the Rohtas district average of 918. The sex ratio was higher among the 0-6 age group, where it was 940, again above the Rohtas district average of 931. Members of scheduled castes made up 18.87% of the block population, and members of scheduled tribes made up 0.38%. The literacy rate of the block was 71.43%, below the overall Rohtas district rate of 73.37%. Literacy was higher in men than in women, with 81.52% of men but only 60.49% of women able to read and write. The corresponding 21.03% gender literacy gap was slightly higher than the Rohtas average of 19.91%.

=== Employment ===
A majority of Dinara block's workforce was employed in agriculture in 2011, with 31.60% being cultivators who owned or leased their own land and another 47.51% being agricultural laborers who worked someone else's land for wages. A further 3.22% were household industry workers, and the remaining 16.20% were other workers.

== Amenities ==
The village of Dinara does not have tap water, with drinking water instead provided by hand pump. 9 villages have tap water. No villages have public toilets. 119 of the block's 181 inhabited villages, Dinara among them, have electrical power, or 65.75%, the lowest proportion in Rohtas. 44 villages have telephone service.

== Transport ==
There is bus service but no railway station in Dinara. Dinara has permanent pucca roads, which are connected to both national and state highways. On the block level, there are 20 villages with pucca roads, or 11.05%, the lowest proportion in Rohtas. 44 villages have transport communications, defined as bus, rail, or navigable waterways; 16 of these have bus service, and no villages have rail access.

== Villages ==
There are 229 villages in Dinara block, including the village of Dinara itself. Of these, 181 are inhabited and 48 are uninhabited.

Village name	Total land area (hectares)	Population (in 2011)
Mahesh Dehri	68	203
Surtapur	270	2,339
Bhadi	108	436
Khirodhar Chok	24	0
Madhopur	105	0
Saisar	248	3,898
Paharipur	83	150
Manikpur	93	141
Gangari	134	1,529
Dharik Dehri	41	0
Maira	147	867
Pitsar	74	201
Khakharahi	110	960
Jogia	124	738
Manihari	142	1,554
Koiria	258	1,934
Dahingna	167	1,232
Rampur	38	0
Baradhikaith	36	0
Semra	85	389
Dumra	137	635
Salempur	18	0
Jagdishpur	52	135
Laheri	117	1,267
Isarpura	104	1,011
Bisi Khurd	287	1,189
Bisi Kalan	239	2,570
Koraria	60	406
Bensagar	257	1,699
Pongarhi	48	871
Mednipur	369	2,236
Chorpokhar English	332	2,197
Bharsara	198	2,479
Belhan	195	1,343
Mohanpur	49	689
Bichhiavan	153	621
Lilwachh	197	1,590
Phulehra	34	0
Tetarhar	80	763
Dehri	105	327
Baradi	174	1,428
Chakio	79	0
Babhni	25	0
Kauni	72	437
Dalipur	60	422
Manipur	68	0
Chilbila	159	1,272
Dehri	87	74
Bhui	286	1,585
Semri	171	1,055
Semri Dih	148	269
Bhairo Dehri	101	234
Sujanpur	142	442
Bhatpurwa	43	547
Bhanpur	783	6,507
Dharkandha	396	2,379
Puhpi	96	478
Bishunpur	33	332
Ghorwanchh	212	1,783
Gaura	122	671
Kumhaura	121	726
Khanita	166	1,403
Narayanpur	48	0
Kalyanpur	40	0
Bishambharpur	143	1,617
Dhanuk Dehri	41	0
Tenuvath	134	1,563
Bhaluni	367	2,031
Samhauti	29	44
Kharika	76	603
Madhopur	62	337
Saidpur	43	0
Udayabhanpur	50	0
Maudehra	83	1,583
Jamorhi	191	1,220
Nadauan	304	1,844
Mahraurh	369	3,347
Niyazipur	59	1,110
Sonbarsa	98	473
Rajpur	197	2,583
Bardiha	123	644
Harbanspur	190	2,065
Pachauli	112	751
Sarana	227	2,145
Makundpur	106	567
Ankrehiya	24	0
Karanj	140	2,245
Dariapur	45	0
Man Dihri	48	0
Sagpokhar	49	0
Ranni	81	881
Paranpur	36	559
Panrria	174	330
Belvaiya	172	2,126
Bhainsahi	35	0
Dharamagatpur	172	2,126
Parasrampur	185	1,086
Gigna	146	1,561
Jagdishpur Chak	25	0
Dhaula Chak	17	233
Sakhua	34	320
Rehi	107	937
Sarana	175	2,199
Dhaneshpur	35	0
Bararhi Khurd	78	187
Bararhi Kalan	114	1,574
Sambhu Dehri	75	443
Narayanpur	28	0
Dinara (block headquarters)	588	11,733
Jamraurh	267	4,049
Kauwakhonch	100	530
Phangi	38	0
Bazic Chak	31	0
Saraenarhar	32	0
Sareyan	124	594
Mirzapur Gaganpurwa	32	395
Mirzapur Khairi	29	309
Kishunipur	47	95
Narsingh Chak	37	0
Sadhwa	125	409
Lakhanpura	21	0
Ankorha	382	3,420
Bariyarpur	145	613
Tora	99	290
Panditpura	53	590
Munra	51	339
Marua	104	985
Khalsapur	75	723
Durgapur	17	0
Girdhariya	212	1,164
Dhawniyan	168	1,553
Kusahi	188	1,553
Baghelpur	168	0
Turki	57	478
Bisrampur	183	766
Babhandiha	174	249
Gazipur	45	0
Kaniyari	443	1,740
Ghurki	150	817
Samhauti Buzurg	206	2,088
Dihra	145	737
Mathiya	70	987
Sareyan	68	0
Raja Sareyan	35	0
Kunr	262	2,846
Hansri Dihra	131	0
Bhanas	429	2,655
Rampur	49	0
Gopalpur	378	2,204
Shahpur	75	0
Khairhi	74	1,311
Milki	32	0
Pithni	192	1,093
Pitambarpur	18	0
Hinchhapur	25	0
Pipra	92	485
Basdiha	283	2,333
Girdharpur	25	0
Arang	476	3,549
Semra	208	1,316
Bhelari Pachhiari	143	358
Kapur Chak	28	0
Bhelari Bichali	182	997
Parsa	66	571
Chilharua	519	2,710
Erazibhuawal	18	0
Dhanpura	30	981
Bhuawal	178	851
Majha Khora	30	271
Kori	251	1596
Balia	269	2,253
Biraua Khurd	51	347
Biraua Kalan	144	690
Kishunpura	82	634
Arila Raghunathpur	357	2,054
Sahuari	61	622
Bhaluahi	119	392
Karmaini	265	1,268
Gariganwan	72	609
Bhelari Purwari	213	885
Bairipur	74	854
Baruna	177	677
Milki	315	477
Muswath	379	2,156
Misraulia	60	258
Jagdishpur	172	1,123
Karhansi	653	3,973
Khairhi	135	1,170
Dhar Hara	102	559
Kharwath	342	1,858
Gajauwan	45	113
Nadauwan	49	242
Rampur Khurd	41	392
Rampur Kalan	46	364
Sarawan	312	2,641
Karaundi	280	2,287
Bidhi Khap	27	343
Bishunpura	51	316
Ahirawan	193	1,424
Asia	163	1,139
Pachsahan	28	219
Tanuaj	153	3,475
Mansinha Dehri	60	220
Parbatpur	25	101
Natwar Kalan	132	4,549
Gobindpur	52	0
Pipri	96	1,295
Nauwa	110	1,085
Amuwa	84	505
Natwar Khurd	188	2,086
Dubauli	56	0
Dehri	72	1,047
Basuhari	146	1,128
Gunsej	320	2,529
Lohra	65	1,033
Bilaspur	104	571
Bakra	170	1,819
Masudan Dehri	33	0
Panjari	72	1,191
Gagadharpur	32	0
Gorsara	97	1,496
Madhukarpur	50	298
Basedeo Dehri	102	1,061
Bhainsra	68	912
Arthu	195	1,583
Ladai Dih	62	0
Bahrar	65	0
Manoharpur	27	1,145
Kukurha	71	271
