= National Highway 922 (India) =

National highway in India

National Highway 922
- Map of National Highway 922 in red

Route information
- Auxiliary route of NH 22
- Maintained by National Highways Authority of India (NHAI)
- Length: 140 km (87 mi)

Major junctions
- East end: Mithapur, Patna
- West end: Buxar

Location
- Country: India
- States: Bihar,
- Primary destinations: Bihta and Arrah

Highway system
- Roads in India; Expressways; National; State; Asian
← NH 22	→ NH 31

National Highway 922 (NH 922) or Patna-Arrah-Buxar highway is a National Highway in Bihar, India. It connects NH-22 near Mithapur in Patna with NH-31 in Buxar, via Bihta and Arrah. The eastern end of the Purvanchal Expressway at Haydaria in Ghazipur district is around 17 km from Buxar on NH-922.

== Route ==
Bihar

In Bihar NH-922 is known as Patna-Arrah-Buxar road. Its route from east to west is as follows:

- Mithapur, Patna
- Phulwari Sharif
- Danapur
- Bihta
- Koilwar
- Sakaddi
- Gidha, Arrah
- Behea
- Brahmpur
- Dumraon
- Buxar

Note:

- From Buxar, NH-319A moves south towards Chausa, Ramgarh & Mohania.
- From Buxar, cross Ganga river and connect with Varanasi-Ghazipur-Ballia (NH-31).

== Junction ==
- NH 22 at Mithapur, Patna
- NH 139 at Phulwari Sharif
- SH 81 at Sakaddi
- NH 319 at Gidha, Arrah
- SH 102 at Behea
- NH 120 at Dumraon
- NH 31 at Buxar
