= Amiyawar =

- Village
- Location in Bihar, India Amiyawar (India)
- Coordinates: 25°03′11″N 84°31′01″E
- Country: India
- State: Bihar
- District: Rohtas
- Elevation: 101 m (331 ft)

Population (2001)
  - Total: 13,000

Languages
  - Official: Bhojpuri, Hindi
- Time zone: UTC+5:30 (IST)
- PIN: 821310
- Website: rohtas.nic.in

Amiyawar is a village situated on the bank of the Son River in Rohtas district, Bihar, India. It is located close to the Nasriganj Police Station

== Agriculture ==
Amiyawar region plays a very important role in farming. Its primary crops are rice, wheat and vegetables. It

== Climate ==
Winter temperatures typically range between 8 and 22 degrees Celsius. Summer temperatures are generally between 22 and 39 degrees Celsius.

== Connectivity and others ==
Amiyawar is connected to the transport system via state highway 15. In the village, there is a post office, a bank, a government school, a mosque, a rice mill, and several brick factories.

== Geography ==
Amiyawar is located between Khutaha and Nasriganj. It has an average elevation of 101 metres (331 ft).
