= Sakaddi =

Indian village in Bhojpur district, Bihar

- Village
- Location in Bihar, India Sakaddi (India)
- Coordinates: 25°34′54″N 84°45′16″E
- Country: India
- State: Bihar
- Division: Patna
- District: Bhojpur
- Block: Koilwar

Government
  - Type: Gram panchayat
  - Body: Sakaddi Panchayat
  - MLA: Kiran Devi Yadav

Population (2011)
  - Total: 8,294
- Time zone: UTC+5:30 (IST)
- PIN Code: 802160
- Telephone code: +91-6182
- Vehicle registration: BR-03

Sakaddi (Hindi: सकड्डी) is a village and gram panchayat in Koilwar block, Bhojpur district in the Indian state of Bihar. Situated between Arrah and Koilwar, it is a large village with around 8,294 residents (Census 2011).

== Politics ==
The Sakaddi village is a part of Sandesh assembly seat under the Arrah Lok Sabha.

== Transport ==
=== Railway ===
- Kulharia railway station (1 km)
- Koelwar railway station (4 km)
- Arrah Junction (10 km)

=== Roads ===
- Patna-Arrah-Buxar (NH-922)
- Sakaddi-Nasriganj (SH-81)
