= National Highway 131G (India) =

National highway under construction in Bihar

- Schematic map of National Highways in India

Route information
- Auxiliary route of NH 31
- Length: 63.16 km (39.25 mi)

Major junctions
- West end: Dighwara (Saran district)
- East end: Ramnagar (Patna district)

Location
- Country: India
- States: Bihar

Highway system
- Roads in India; Expressways; National; State; Asian
← NH 31	→ NH %route%

National Highway 131G (NH-131G) is an under-construction 6-lane wide national highway in Bihar, India. The NH-131G is a part of Patna Ring Road and connects NH-31 at Dighwara in Saran district to Ramnagar in Patna district, via Sherpur and Kanhauli in Patna. This highway is a spur of NH-31.

As of December 2024, the projected date of completion was September 2027.

== See also ==
- National Highway 131
- List of national highways in India
- List of national highways in India by state
