= Piania =

Piania पियनिया
- Village
- Location in Bihar, India Piania (India)
- Coordinates: 25.499278°N 84.645860°E
- Country: India
- State: Bihar
- District: Bhojpur
- Elevation: 74 m (243 ft)

Population (2010)
  - Total: 7,000

Languages
  - Official: Bhojpuri, Hindi
- Time zone: UTC+5:30 (IST)
- PIN: 802210
- Telephone code: 91-6337
- Vehicle registration: BR-03

Piania is a small village in Bhojpur district, Bihar in India. This village is situated on the bank of Arrah Canal which originates from Dehri on Sone (Sone river). The connectivity to this village is by bus from Arrah. The distance between Arrah railway station and Piania is around 4 kilometre and population strength is around 7,000–10,000.

== Locations ==
Pool: The canal bridge for road is termed as pool . On pool, there are several shops including a sweet-shop, general store, motor-mechanic, local-restaurant, and a physician.

Math (temple): This temple is almost 400 years old. The deities which could be found in this temple are Lord Rama, Laxmana, and Seeta along with Hanumaan, Shiva, Parvati. It also has charan-padukas of khadeshwar guru who renovated this temple some 100 years ago.
