= Hariharganj =

- Block

- Location in Jharkhand, India
- Coordinates: 24.50°N 84.27°E
- Country: India
- State: Jharkhand
- District: Palamu
- Block: Hariharganj

Area
  - Total: 240.72 km^{2} (92.94 sq mi)
- Elevation: 108 m (354 ft)

Population (2011)
  - Total: 74,203
  - Density: 308.25/km^{2} (798.38/sq mi)

Languages
  - Official: Hindi, Santali
- Time zone: UTC+5:30 (IST)
- Telephone code: 06566
- Vehicle registration: JH
- Website: palamu.nic.in/Hariharganj.html

Hariharganj block is one of the administrative blocks of Palamu district, Jharkhand state, India. According to census (2001), the block has 13,579 households with aggregate population of 87,499. The block has 194 villages.

Hariharganj lies on the border of the Palamu district, along the National Highway 139. The people of this region primarily speak Magadhi.

== Geography ==
Hariharganj is located at 24.50°N 84.27°E. It has an average elevation of 10,000 yards (9,100 m).

Hariharganj is situated at the border of Jharkhand and Bihar at NH-98.

== Demographics ==
- Geographical Area - 59,483 acres (24,072 ha)
- Total Population - 87499
- Total Population (Male) - 45397
- Total Population (Female)- 42102
- Total Literates - 34230
- Total Literate (Male) - 22859
- Total Literate (Female) - 11371

Religion in Hariharganj block (2011)
Religion	Percent
Hinduism	92.32%
Islam	7.51%
Other or not stated	0.17%

At the time of the 2011 census, Hariharganj block had a population of 74,203. Hariharganj block had a sex ratio of 924 females per 1000 males and a literacy rate of 64.66%: 74.83% for males and 53.60% for females. 12,914 (17.40%) were under 7 years of age. 11,811 (15.92%) lived in urban areas. Scheduled Castes and Scheduled Tribes made up 26,677 (35.95%) and 118 (0.16%) of the population, respectively.

Languages of Hariharganj block (2011)
1. Magahi (57.8%)
2. Hindi (39.4%)
3. Urdu (2.65%)
4. Others (0.19%)

== Administration ==
The panchyayats under this block include:

1. Saraiya
2. Salaiya
3. Pipra
4. Dalpatpur
5. Babhandih
6. Semarwar
7. Dhakcha
8. Arruwa Khurd
9. Satgawa or Hariharganj west part
10. Satgawa or Hariharganj east part
11. Siyar Bhucka
12. Kataiya
13. Kharagpur
14. Sarsot
15. Tendua
16. Madhubana
17. Kulahiya
18. Belodar
19. Dema

== Infrastructure ==
Primary Health Centres

- Health - Sanctioned post-25, Working-16, vacancy-9
- Family Welfare - Sanctioned post-23, Working-11, vacancy-12
- Malaria - Sanctioned post-5, Working-2, vacancy-3

Health Facilities
The citizens of this C.D.BLOCK avail 2 Allopathy Hospital, 2 Maternity & Child Welfare Center, 2 Registered Private Medical Practitioners

Drinking Water/Water Supply
The main sources of water in this C.D.BLOCK are 1 tap water, 126 well water, 3 tank water, 112 handpump, 4 river, 3 canals

Post and Telegraph
There are 13 Post Office, 3 telephone connections

Communication facilities and approach to the village
This block is linked with 22 Bus services

Banking facilities
It has 5 Commercial Bank, 3 Co-operative Commercial Bank. There are 2 Agricultural Credit Societies, 1 Other Credit Societies.

Power supply
It has electricity connection and receives the power 19 for Domestic use, 8 for Agricultural use, 2 for Other purposes, 10 for all purposes.

Recreational facilities
It has 2 Cinema Hall/Video Halls

Land use/land cover and Irrigation
Out of total area 8921.8 Hc. is under forest, 661 Hc. is under Culturable waste, 1409.34 Hc. is under unculturable wasteland (Area not available for cultivation) The irrigation is done on, 336.77 Hc. with Government canal, 114.6 Hc. with Private canal, 910.91 Hc. with well (without electricity), 425.43 Well (with electricity), 96.59 Hc. with Tube-Well (without Electricity), 24 Hc. with Tube-Well (with electricity), 238.29 Hc. with Tank, 44.04 Hc. with River, 27.08 Hc. with Lake, 905.98 Hc. with Others
- Total Irrigated Area: 3123.69
- Total Unirrigated Area: 8587.12

=== Education ===
No. of schools:

- Primary schools - 58
- Middle schools - 13
- High schools - 3

Some of the notable educational institutes include:

- Sita+2 High School
- Balika Ucch Vidyalaya
- Moti Raj Mahila Maha Vidyalaya
- Bal Kishore Singh Maha Vidyalaya

== See also ==
- Palamu Loksabha constituency
- Jharkhand Legislative Assembly
- Jharkhand
- Palamu
