= Nasriganj =

Nasriganj Nāsriganj
- Nagar panchayat town
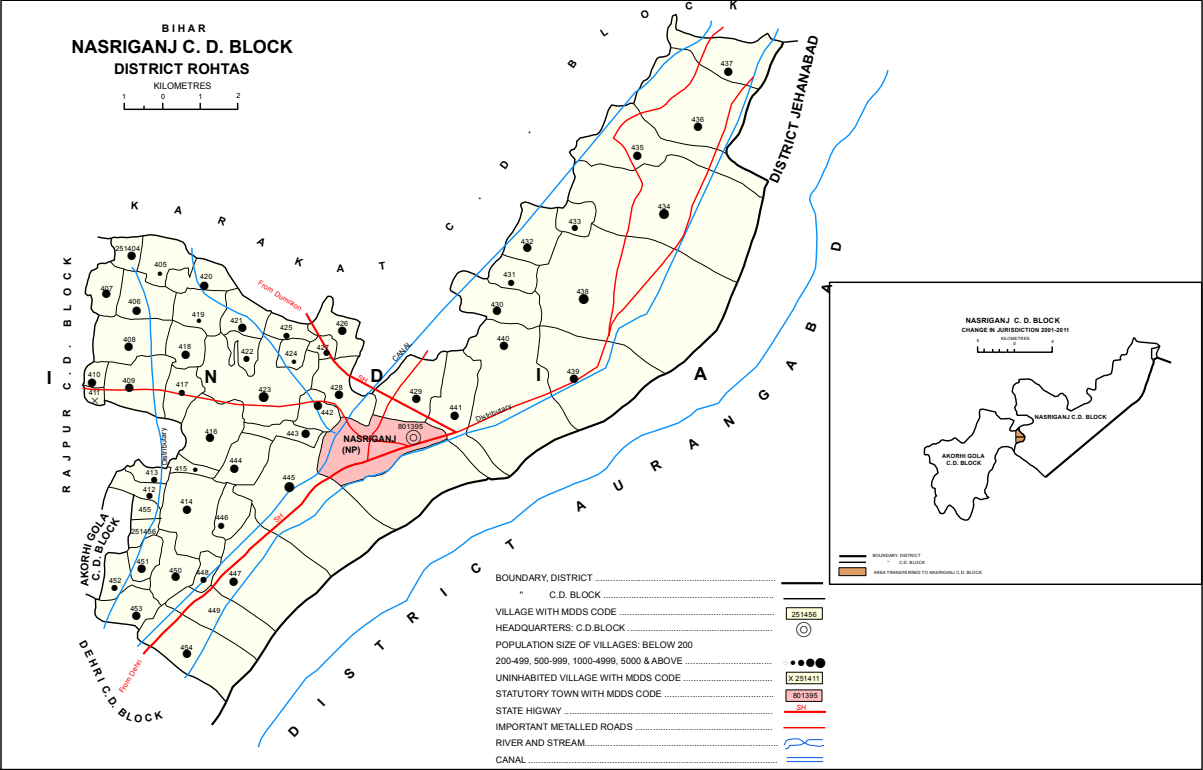

- Location in Bihar, India Nasriganj (India)
- Coordinates: 25.0514°N 84.32839°E
- Country: India
- State: Bihar
- District: Rohtas

Languages
  - Official: Bhojpuri, Hindi, Urdu
- Time zone: UTC5:30 (IST)
- PIN: 821310
- Telephone code: 06185
- Vehicle registration: BR 24
- Nearest city: Dehri/Sasaram
- Lok Sabha constituency: Karakat
- Vidhan Sabha constituency: Nokha

Nasriganj (Hindi: नासरीगंज) is a nagar panchayat town and corresponding community development block situated in Rohtas District of Bihar, India. Located on the banks of the Son River, the town was a vibrant economic hub in the late 19th century. The town of Nasriganj had a population of 23,819, according to the 2011 Census of India, while the total population of Nasriganj block was 115,117. Besides the town of Nasriganj itself, the block consisted of 53 villages, of which 50 were inhabited and 3 were uninhabited.

== Name ==
Nasirganj takes its name from a Sufi name, Mir Nasir Dehlavi, who came to the village in late 19th century. His mausoleum is situated at the center of Nasriganj.

== History ==
The town of Nasriganj dates back to 1740, when the eponymous Abdul Nasir settled here on the Arrah-Sasaram road.

Nasriganj was formerly ruled by a local native dynasty. In 1867, the last ruler died without heirs, and the estate escheated to the British government. At this time, it was an important commercial and manufacturing centre, with 21 paper mills and 42 sugar refineries. It lost much of its importance in the ensuing years, and was downgraded from town to village status, but by 1921 it was still described as a notable trade centre, along with nearby Hariharganj. At that time, it possessed a large turbine-powered mill that produced oil, sugar, and flour, and paper was still manufactured on a smaller scale. The population of Nasriganj in 1921 was 5,332.

Nasriganj was raised to nagar panchayat status in 2011.

== Economy ==
Today, the main commodities manufactured in Nasriganj are blankets, furniture, and bricks.

Izhar Market in downtown Nasriganj contains than 30 shops. This market is a big attraction for people coming from nearby villages. Apart from this market, there is a big vegetable and food grain market and produces like potatoes, rice and gur are exported from this market. There are more markets in Nasriganj such as Aslam Market.

The main occupation of people of Nasriganj is trade.

== Academic centers ==
Nasriganj has one of the oldest high schools in the Rohtas district. It was founded in 1929 and at that time only two other high schools were nearby (namely Osaw High school and Burhwal High School).

== Transport ==
Nasriganj (Rohtas district) is situated around 6 km west of Daudnagar (Aurangabad district).

=== Roads ===
- Sakaddi–Nasriganj (SH-81)
- Nasriganj–Dehri-on-Sone (SH-15)
- Bikramganj–Nasriganj–Gaya (NH-120)

=== Railway ===
- Bikramganj railway station (19 km)
- Dehri-on-Sone railway station (21 km)
- Garh Nokha railway station (24 km)

== List of villages ==
As of 2011, Nasriganj block consisted of 53 villages, of which 50 were inhabited and 3 were uninhabited.

Village name	Total land area (hectares)	Population (in 2011)
Tilsa	64	1,291
Amalawa	142.4	404
Parasia	160.3	2,377
Darekhap	105.6	1,166
Shankarpur	215.4	2,216
Mauna	227	3,702
Turkaulia	37.3	1,177
Rampur	18.2	0
Ramadih	87	546
Gamharia	62.3	704
Pauni	316.4	3,274
Ghoghaha	37.2	363
Pipardih	240.9	1,697
Babhandih	100.2	804
Baradih	102	1,251
Panapur	147.3	349
Dehri	122.3	3,228
Maraujhia	109.7	3,345
Ojhwalia	64.3	700
Dhanawan English	450.4	5,869
Kath Khaulia	53.9	474
Chargoria	66.4	729
Itamha	121.4	3,606
Dhanawan Khalsa	32.3	535
Balia	170	2,472
Bardiha	254.2	3,256
Mednipur	227.8	2,173
Agini	100.8	538
Paiga	181.7	1,822
Bagea	76	907
Khiriawan	1,012.9	7,778
Sabari	434.2	3,183
Kaithi	599	4,118
Kacchawa	293.45	3,725
Mangrawan	1,410	8,484
Mahadewa	519.3	3,330
Atimi	775.8	3,504
Pokharaha Jamalpur	273.6	4,565
Jina	90.2	2,536
Manauli	114.6	1,786
Chitokhar	140	1,509
Amiawar	776.2	7,412
Khutaha	94.8	943
Sabdala	528.6	1,546
Bharkol	42.4	512
Sohra	270.7	142
Ghari	143.6	1,319
Madhopur	75.7	1,037
Mangitpur	77.3	555
Sahgi	144.9	1,932
Panruri	388.4	4,226
Kaithi Mahazi	300	0
Kachhawa Mahazi	181	0
