= Kochas =

- Town
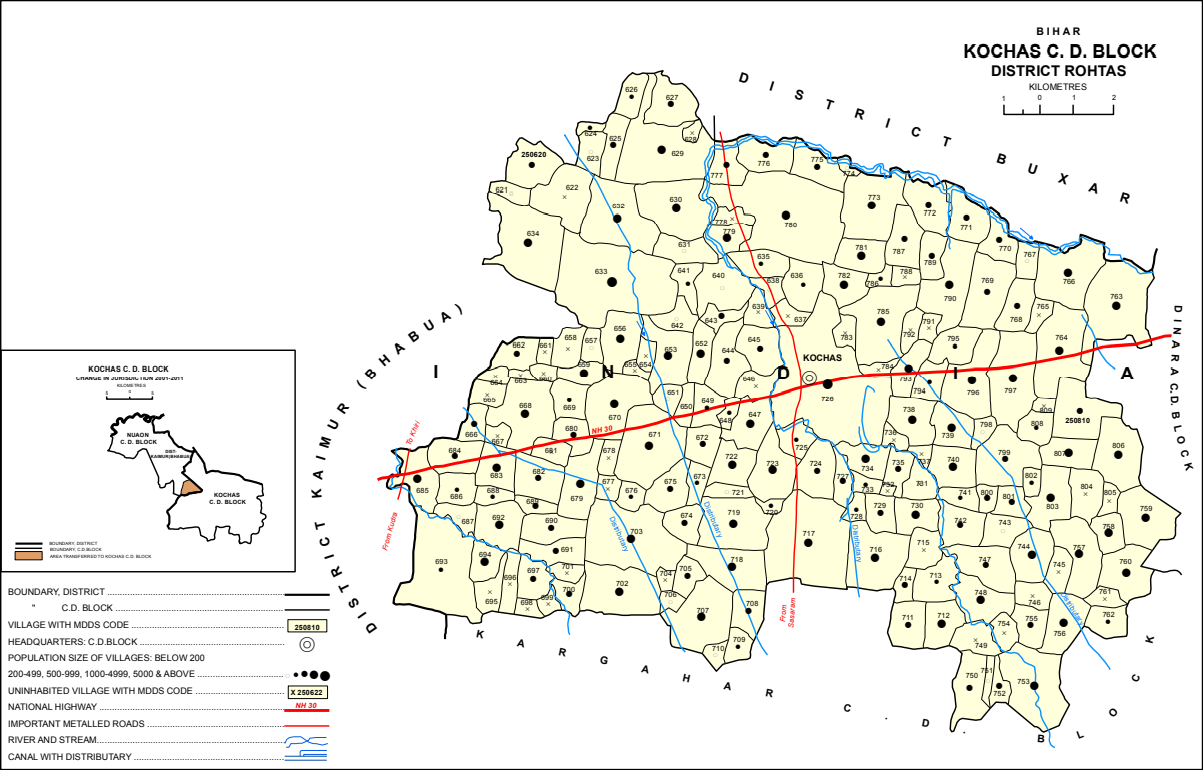

- Location in Bihar, India
- Coordinates: 25°15′0″N 83°55′0″E
- Country: India
- State: Bihar
- District: Rohtas

Area
  - Total: 8.7209 km^{2} (3.3672 sq mi)
- Elevation: 69 m (226 ft)

Population (2011)
  - Total: 21,597
  - Density: 2,476.5/km^{2} (6,414.0/sq mi)

Languages
  - Official: Hindi
- Time zone: UTC+5:30 (IST)
- PIN: 821112
- Telephone code: 06184
- Coastline: 0 kilometres (0 mi)
- Nearest city: Sasaram
- Sex ratio: 1000 / 898 ♂/♀
- Literacy: 51.26%
- Lok Sabha constituency: Sasaram
- Climate: Mixed Climate (Köppen)
- Avg. summer temperature: 43 °C (109 °F)
- Avg. winter temperature: 23 °C (73 °F)

Kochas is a town and corresponding community development block in Rohtas district of Bihar state, India. It is located at an elevation of 69 m above MSL. National Highway 319 (old NH-30) passes through Kochas. The nearest airport is Varanasi Airport (105 km). The most famous cultural event of Kochas is Krishn Lila, also known as "Kans Lila". Beside Krishn Lila other famous cultural activities are Chhath Puja, Durga Puja and other religious functions. Kochas's Surya Mandir sun temple is identity of Kochas. It was established on 1 October (SS).

As of 2011, the population of Kochas was 21,597, in 3,287 households, making it the largest village in Rohtas district. The entire block had a population of 170,025. The nearest major city is Sasaram, the Rohtas district headquarters.

== Demographics ==
Kochas is an entirely rural block, with no major urban centres. The sex ratio of Kochas block in 2011 was 916, slightly below the overall Rohtas district average of 918 (921 for rural areas). The sex ratio was slightly higher in the 0-6 age group at the time, with 922 females for every 1000 males. Members of scheduled castes made up 18.2% of the block population, comparable to the district average of 18.57%, and scheduled tribes made up 0.36% of the block's residents. The literacy rate of Kochas block was 75.24%, somewhat higher than the Rohtas district rate of 73.37%. Literacy was higher in men than in women, with 83.82% of men but only 65.87% of women able to read and write. The corresponding 17.95% gap was lower than the overall Rohtas district literacy gender gap of 19.91%.

The population of the village of Kochas in 2011 was 21,597, of whom 3,681 (17.04%) were in the 0-6 age group. 52.71% of the population was male (11,384) and 48.29% was female (10,213). The village literacy rate was 64.95%.

== Employment ==
A majority of the Kochas block workforce was engaged in agriculture in 2011, with 36.84% of all block workers being cultivators who owned their own land and a further 44.41% being agricultural labourers who worked someone else's land for wages. 2.48% of the workforce was engaged in household industry (the lowest proportion of any block in Rohtas), and the remaining 16.28% was classified as other workers.

== Villages ==
There are 191 villages in Kochas block, including Kochas itself. Of these, 148 are inhabited and 43 are uninhabited.

Village name	Total land area (hectares)	Population (in 2011)
Babuka Bahuara	134	830
Parsia	63.53	82
Chatra Pacchimwari	221	0
Mirga	66.77	63
Chakia	25.9	293
Panditpura	99.15	929
Pauat	74.36	347
Shiwpur	150	546
Benipur	31.57	0
Gara	387	3,280
Anhari	302	1,753
Ghenrwa	115	67
Charra Purwari	322	2,159
Kuchhila	629.28	6,269
Sarangpura	397.4	1,145
Harihar Dehra	113	455
Korigawan	134.76	407
Gongoulia	57.87	0
Jagdispur	57	193
Damodar Dehra	73.25	0
Shiwpur	179.68	185
Dharampura	78	202
Mallu Dehra	105.22	69
Podumsi Dehra	56.25	626
Khaira	182.11	564
Wojhwalia	127.47	629
Hurarha	55.4	0
Semaria	167.74	1,012
Gobindpur	36.32	254
Harnathpur	74.06	441
Rajan Dih	46.64	177
Sirpalpur	48.97	95
Sareya	99.15	1,626
Phuli	185.75	1,307
Tirlokdehri	32.78	0
Dharmagatpur	31.97	0
Navalia	180.29	1,224
Gangapur	36.02	186
Renria	78.81	0
Dighata	100.77	1,621
Berukahi	51.39	0
Misir Potti	26.2	0
Ekauni	80.94	908
Harpur	29.54	0
Barman Chak	38.85	0
Bharhuli	57.46	0
Khairi	65.96	681
Dayal Patti	41.28	0
Salas	254.64	1,731
Khorhari	89.03	321
Chitaini	236	1,627
Laheri	332.6	2,030
Baradih	97.73	641
Adilapur	70.4	421
Khairi	101.2	601
Andaur	127	703
Chhitan Dehra	52.6	468
Khajapur	44.9	0
Bardiha	46	0
Nainakon	205.17	1,484
Rupinbandh	76.48	922
Bhandera	70.41	0
Barahuti Kalan	154.59	527
Bahuara	125.1	2,166
Sohasa	135.97	723
Parsathua	167.94	4,762
Petphorua	87.8	476
Ekauni	75.68	92
Bharadih	48.16	308
Barahuti Khurd	45	0
Patna	118.57	528
Hatna	107.6	661
Karanchhata	166.73	619
Katharain	455.3	2,320
Sokrauli	87.01	391
Sobhipur	70.41	1,255
Tirgunpur	79.2	0
Athrolia	99.15	591
Bhairopur	36.07	0
Lakhanpura	30.3	0
Bedwalia	68.9	624
Phulwario	45.73	0
Sobhalia	255	1,854
Kapasia	439.9	2,855
Lodipur	28	0
Manpura	594	
Sunderpur	30.76	21
Baradih	262.64	1,936
Mahuari	93.08	901
Jalalpur	61.6	289
Mohanpur	47.7	16
Misraulia	127.47	718
Kokhar	110.48	1,104
Amhaita	126.66	411
Sanwandehri	49	530
Dulla Saray	94.7	0
Satasa	255.8	2,144
Balthari	522.9	3,590
Rampur	204.4	1,329
Debaria	251	1,497
Kusahi	32.3	206
Bajaraha	38.9	79
Tetaria	144.4	1,128
Parsiya	182.1	2,162
Gaura	147.3	947
Hetampur	84.98	259
Kochas (block headquarters)	872.09	21,597
Dhantha	69.2	681
Bindaulia	41.28	315
Narayanpur	90.85	675
Bahoranpur	119	1,144
Gajrarhi	74.87	0
Chakia	17.81	0
Mamrezpur	41.78	254
Lakari	106.03	1,711
Pakari	65.56	675
Duja Ghewra	39.15	0
Parmesardehra	27.11	0
Karjar	141.23	1,797
Amarsidehra	123.43	1,096
Ghewra	136.78	1,180
Meura	59.08	390
Bararhi	132.33	818
Damodardehra	87.82	116
Reniya	144.47	1,575
Latari	68.39	0
Shahpur	70.01	0
Nimiyan	166.73	665
Ekaunia, Kochas	152.97	1,252
Turkaha	108.86	0
Kothuwa	145.28	850
Sai	20.64	41
Bisopur	53.01	910
Agarsidehra	313.83	2,077
Jharkhuria	59.08	0
Kaarmaini	86.6	662
Purahra	165.11	1,335
Latra	192.22	1,318
Maudehra	75.68	1,143
Ubdhi	215.29	1,729
Bharsara	152.56	1,160
Bharsaria	50.59	0
Paltudehra	82.22	323
Andaur	395.75	2,307
Chitawan	300.78	2,418
Khairi	41.28	0
Delhua	270.83	1,568
Mansapur	61.92	6
Sorathi	118.98	976
Sorath	225	620
Helha	84.17	721
Bhunrwa	132.84	786
Dhabchhua	148	770
Khadawan	266.28	1,057
Bijan Dehra	24.69	101
Hardaspur	134.35	941
Bharhua	146.9	657
Bhagatganj	88.62	883
Konharpurwa	55.04	0
Bhagiratha	79.22	1,134
Narwar	617.15	3,561
Khudru	103.6	1,414
Saroser	142.74	1,246
Pahanua	61.92	0
Bihar Dihra	61.51	0
Naua	269.11	3,348
Khairi	51.39	204
Dhanchhua	130	978
Jaiti Dihra	56.25	0
Chamraha	83.2	596
Deyadaha	230.26	1,644
Indapur	47.35	0
Baghel Dihra	50.59	0
Usrawan	104	1,380
Usrawan	106.23	206
Majhauli	98.74	343
Darhaon	236	1,482
Katiyara	288.13	1,506
Basu Dehra	49	39
Kursa	227.83	935
Hunrraha	52.2	520
Ghasa	84.17	766
Manipur	34.22	377
Doiya	179.68	1,302
Karbaniyan	140.42	0
Biranpur	42	0
Rupi	206.89	1,211
Pithwaiya	128.79	1,267
Bathori	78	369
Bohora	22	0
Panchu Dehri	182.11	710
