= Kulharia =

Indian village in Bhojpur district, Bihar

- Village
- Location in Bihar, India Kulharia (India)
- Coordinates: 25°34′22″N 84°46′00″E
- Country: India
- State: Bihar
- District: Bhojpur

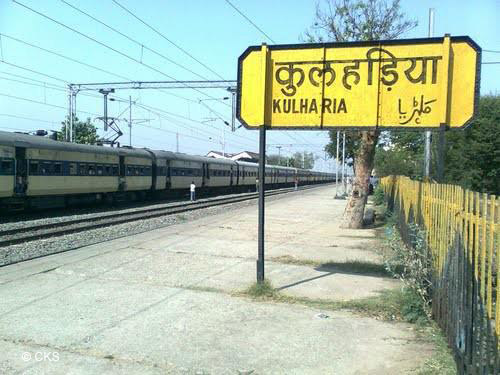
Kulharia station

Kulharia is a village in Koilwar Block, Bhojpur district in the Indian state of Bihar. It is one of the biggest village with more than 10K+ population. It is also known as State village of Bihar.

== Demography ==
Particulars	Total	Male	Female
Total No. of Houses	1157		
Population	7206	3781	3420

== Geography ==
Kulharia is located at 25°34'27.4"N 84°46'17.7"E.

== Connectivity ==
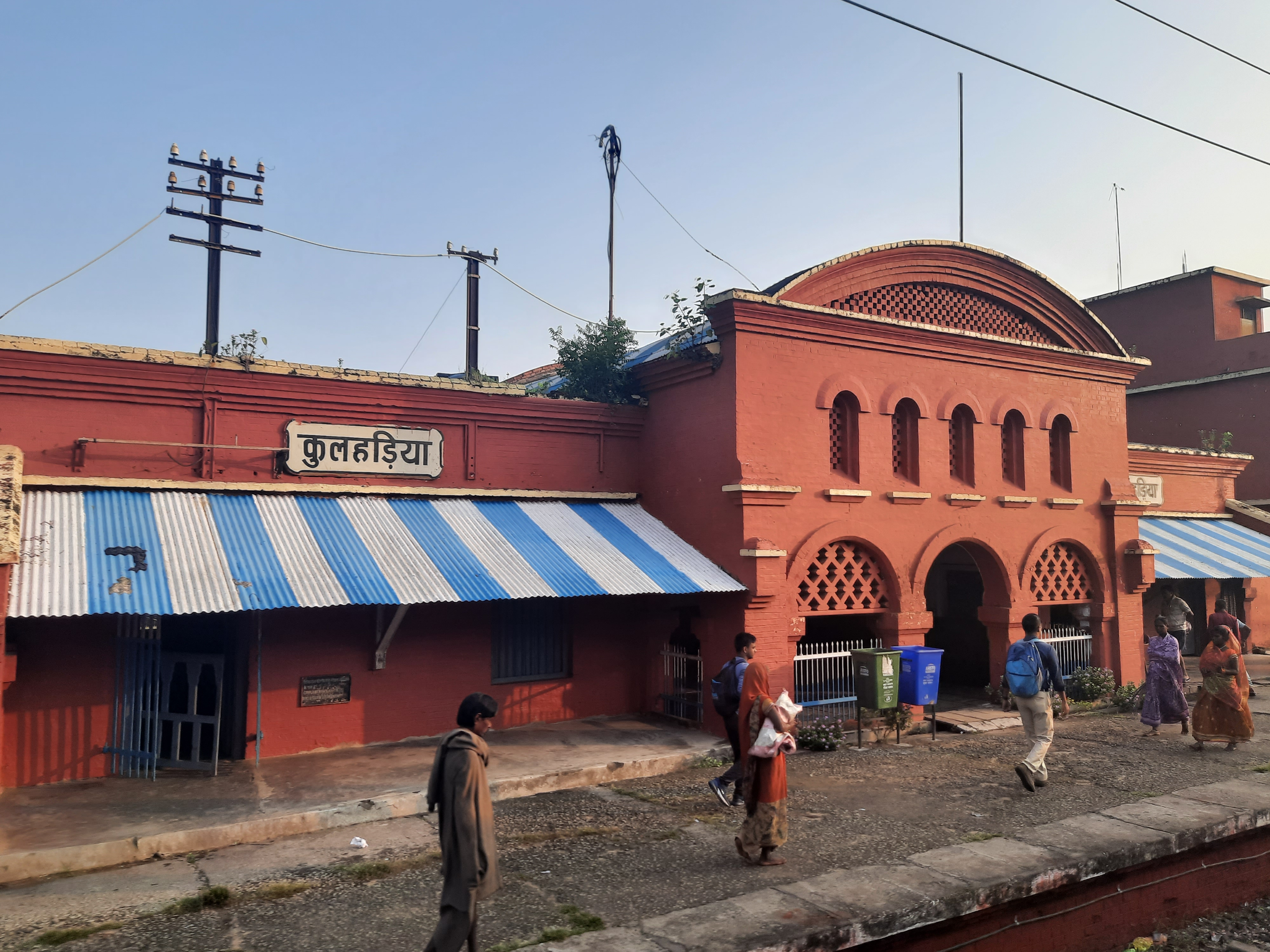
Kulharia railway station (KUA), on Patna-Mughalsarai railway line

The nearest railway station is Kulharia railway station (KUA) which is situated between Bihta and Arrah on the Patna-Mughalsarai railway section.
