= Garhani =

Garhani गड़हनी
- Village
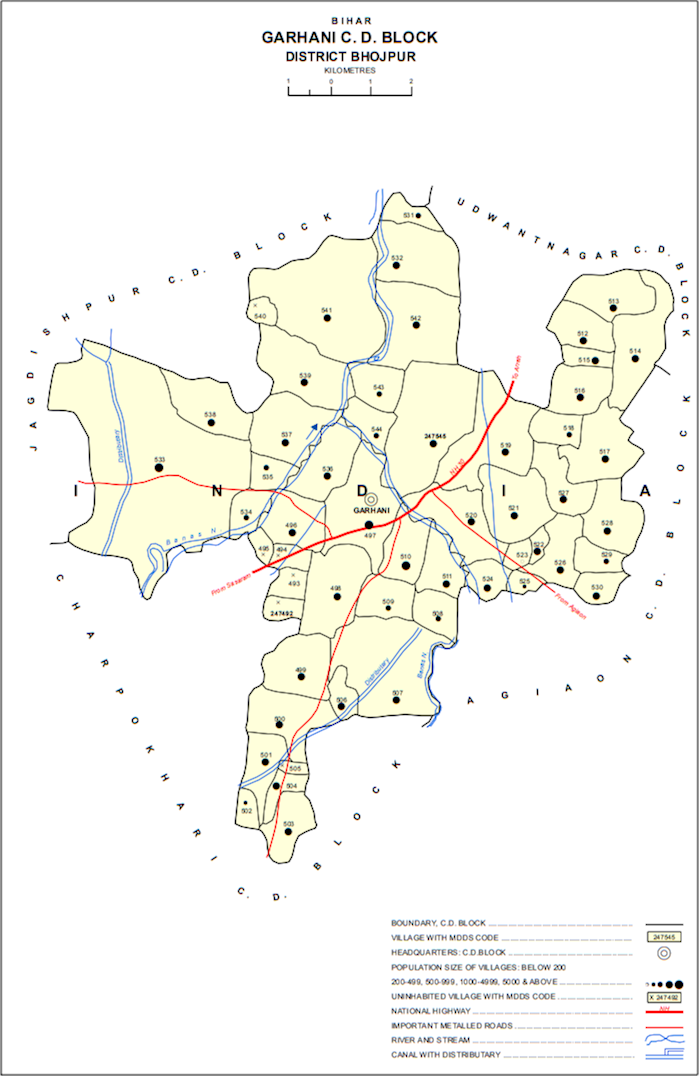
- Map of Garhani block

- Location in Bihar, India
- Coordinates: 25.40726°N 84.55539°E
- Country: India
- State: Bihar
- District: Bhojpur

Area
  - Total: 0.170 km^{2} (0.066 sq mi)
- Elevation: 72 m (236 ft)

Population (2011)
  - Total: 5,597
  - Density: 32,900/km^{2} (85,300/sq mi)

Languages
  - Official: Bhojpuri, Hindi
- Time zone: UTC+5:30 (IST)
- PIN: 802203

Garhani (Hindi: गड़हनी) is a town and Nagar Panchayat having corresponding community development block in Bhojpur district of Bihar, India. As of 2011, its population was 5,597, in 959 households. The total block population was 103,262, in 16,427 households.

== Demographics ==
Garhani is a rural block, with no major urban centres. Its sex ratio was 919 as of 2011, compared to the state and district ratios of 918 and 907, respectively. The sex ratio was higher among the 0-6 age group, with 923 females for every 1000 males. Members of scheduled castes made up 17.55% of block residents, and members of scheduled tribes made up 0.03%. Garhani block's literacy rate was 66.77%, which was slightly below the district rate of 69.16%. Literacy was higher in men (79.14%) than in women (53.3%); the corresponding gender gap of 25.84% was marginally higher than that of the district as a whole (25.45%).

Most workers in Garhani block were employed in agriculture in 2011, with 25.70% being cultivators who owned or leased their own land, and a further 54.20% were agricultural labourers who worked another person's land for wages. An additional 3.13% were household industry workers, and the remaining 16.97% were other workers.

== List of Villages ==
Garhani block contains the following 51 villages: (GP = Gram Panchayat)

Village name	Total land area (hectares)	Population (in 2011)
Bhatauli	53	0
Dolaur Dehri	56	0
Akrahi	49	0
Dhokraha	30	0
Deodhi	169	1,403
Garhani Taluk	339	5,361
Balbandh	291	2,619
Bahri	236	1,712
Karnaul	248	1,553
Chandi	152	1,539
Mukundpur	43	287
Bardiha	140	1,350
Harpur (GP)	72	1,933
Lakarsen	25	0
Sohari	61	1,008
Kaup (GP)	557	4,958
Pathar	110	976
Dhandhauli	122	904
Garhani (block headquarters)	170	5,597
Pararia	141	1,808
Dularpur	131	1,463
Pipra	201	1,944
Kurkuri (GP)	281	3,562
Dubauli	76	1,017
Labhuani	158	1,246
Rampur	257	3,170
Sikti	100	989
Bagwa (GP)	398	4,084
Dhamanian	271	2,837
Baraura (GP)	271	2,159
Chaiyan Chak	35	1,646
Deopur	40	179
Suari	94	1,352
Dehri	29	218
Shivpur	155	1,551
Bahadurpur	168	1,099
Paharpur	203	2,476
Gaura	91	871
Sikaria	88	1,413
Manduri	68	880
Mandura	304	1,726
Baligaon (GP)	1,681	13,976
Tenduni	96	866
Ratanpur	89	943
Sihar, Bhojpur	201	1,091
Hadia Bad	282	1,819
Morasia	206	1,796
Bhinrari	298	1,584
Suaraha	53	0
Ichari (GP)	702	3,835
Sahangi	399	3,182
Azam Nagar	113	911
Ram Dihra	110	693
Barap (GP)	488	3,676
