= National Highway 120 (India) =

National highway in India

National Highway 120
- Map of National Highway 120 in red

Route information
- Auxiliary route of NH 20
- Length: 92 km (57 mi)

Major junctions
- From: Bihar Sharif
- To: Dumraon

Location
- Country: India
- States: Bihar
- Primary destinations: Bihar Sharif; Nalanda; Rajgir; Hisua; Gaya; Daudnagar; Nasriganj; Karakat; Nawanagar; Dumraon

Highway system
- Roads in India; Expressways; National; State; Asian
| ← NH 20 | → NH 922 |

National Highway 120 is a national highway of India. This highway runs entirely in the state of Bihar.

== Route ==
Bihar Sharif, Nalanda, Rajgir, Hisua, Wazirganj, Gaya, Daudnagar, Nasriganj, Karakat, Dawath, Nawanagar, Dumraon.
