= Bikramganj =

Town in Rohtas, Bihar, India

- town
- Location in Bihar, India
- Coordinates: 25.2°N 84.25°E
- Country: India
- State: Bihar
- District: Rohtas

Area
  - Total: 15.64 km^{2} (6.04 sq mi)
- Elevation: 77 m (253 ft)

Population (2024)
  - Total: nearly 1,000
  - Density: 64/km^{2} (170/sq mi)

Languages
  - Official: Bhojpuri, Hindi
- Time zone: UTC+5:30 (IST)
- PIN: 802212
- Telephone code: 06185
- ISO 3166 code: IN-BR
- Website: rohtas.nic.in

Bikramganj is a nagar parishad city and community development block in Rohtas district, Bihar, India. In the 2011 census, Bikramganj had a population of nearly 4 lakh in 17,968 households. The main commodities produced in Bikramganj are rice and pulses. It has a slum known as Dhangai, which had a 2011 population of 3,955 in 637 households. Bikramganj is located at 25.2°N 84.25°E, and has an average elevation of 77 metres (252 feet).

It is an historic commercial center at the crossroads connecting Patna to Sasaram and Buxar to Dehri and Dumraon known as Bikramganj Chowk. Bikramganj, in the less-industrialised north of Rohtas district, is surrounded by well-irrigated, fertile fields which have given the district its reputation as the rice bowl of Bihar. A railway station on Dehri Road connects to the nearby cities of Patna, Sasaram. A number of banks have opened in the city. A small river flows through Bikramganj, known as Kaai and drains into the Ganges in Buxar. Hinduism is the majority religion, and Chhath is a major festival. A local delicacy is litti with chicken, and chhena ka khurma is a sweet. Nearby towns are Suryapura, Kārākāt, Koath, and Sanjhauli. The climate is humid and sub-tropical, good for rice cultivation, and Katarni rice is a well-known variety grown in the region.

== Demographics ==
Historical population
Year	Pop.	±%
1961	5,681	—
1971	14,656	+158.0%
1981	20,570	+40.4%
1991	28,898	+40.5%
2001	38,408	+32.9%
2011	48,465	+26.2%
Source: 2011 Census of India

In 2011, the population of the Bikramganj block was 163,565. Of these, 48,565 lived in the city of Bikramganj and 115,100 lived in rural areas. The block's population increased from 136,703 in 2001 to 163,565 in 2011, a 19.6-percent increase.

Bikramganj's sex ratio was 882 females to 1,000 males in 2011, the lowest among cities in Rohtas district. The ratio was higher in rural areas, with 911 females for every 1,000 males (the second-lowest ratio in Rohtas, ahead of Kargahar), bringing the sex ratio of the sub-district to 902 – the lowest in Rohtas. The sub-district's sex ratio was 902 in the 0-6 age group (the lowest in Rohtas) 894 in the city of Bikramganj, and 906 in rural villages.

The city's 2011 literacy rate was 74.76 percent, slightly below the Rohtas urban average of 78.35 percent. The rate was higher in men, with 81.37 percent of males and 67.26 percent of females able to read and write; the 14.11-percent literacy gender gap was slightly above the district urban average of 13.33 percent. In rural parts of Bikramganj block, the literacy rate was 74.96 percent (slightly above the district rural average of 72.5 percent, with 85.56 percent of men and 63.33 percent of women able to read and write. The combined literacy rate of the sub-district of Bikramganj was 74.90 percent, slightly above the district average of 73.37 percent.

== Amenities ==
Bikramganj had two hospital in 2024, no movie theatres, five nationalised banks and a community centre. It have no of public library at the time.

All 80 villages in Bikramganj block had drinking water in 2011, but only three had tap water; most villages got water from wells or hand pumps. Fifty-seven villages had schools, serving 93.35 percent of the rural population. Twenty had medical facilities serving 44.69 percent of the rural population, and 31 had telephone access serving 60.66 percent of the rural population. Ten villages had banks, eight had agricultural credit societies, and 51 had pucca roads. Fifty-eight villages had electrical power, serving 89.75 percent of the rural population.

== Schools ==
=== Anjabit Singh College ===
Anjabit Singh College is one of the oldest colleges of Veer Kunwar Singh University (VKSU) Arrah, established in 1957 by Nepal Singh, a resident of Dhawan in Bikramganj. Justices Anand Singh and Kainhaiya Singh were members of the college's governing body, and Vishwanath Singh was its founder. The college teaches the arts and science to degree levels, post-graduate education in history and economics in its Faculty of Arts, and has a Bachelor of Computer Application (BCA) course in its vocational-professional program.

=== DAV Public School ===
Established in 2008, the co-educational DAV Public School provides secondary education in English and is affiliated with the Central Board of Secondary Education (CBSE).

=== High School Tenduni ===
Established in 1975, the Hindi co-educational High School Tenduni is managed by the Department of Education and affiliated with the Bihar School Examination Board for secondary and high-secondary education.

=== Utkarmit High School, Ghusia Kalan ===
Established in 1950, the co-educational Hindi Utkarmit High School in Ghusia Kalan is managed by the Ministry of Education and is affiliated with the Bihar School Examination Board at the secondary level.

=== Krishna Sudarshan Public School ===
Established in 2008, Krishna Sudarshan Public School provides English co-educational upper-primary education.

=== St. S. N. Global School ===
The co-educational English school provides the CBSE syllabus and class 1 to high school.

=== Divine Public School ===
Divine Public School, affiliated with CBSE Delhi, was founded in April 2011 and has secondary generator power.

== Villages ==
In addition to the city of Bikramganj, the block has 80 inhabited villages with a total rural population of 115,100.

Village name	Total land area (hectares)	Population (in 2011)
Khirodharpur	152	1,054
Khaira	238	3,240
Isarpura	117	948
Rauni	70	1,001
Kharagpura	60	531
Raksiya	213	1,141
Maidhara	100	876
Karmaini	110	715
Bahuara	162	1,596
Amauna	94	270
Tekanpura	138	1,000
Larui	106	1,042
Kusamhra	226	2,617
Balha	64	381
Jalha	43	594
Bhorna	41	44
Amma Pokhar	64	779
Nonhar	575	5,992
Lilkanthpur	109	816
Dharmagatpur	95	1,224
Paunra	112	1,544
Kharhua	175	1,306
Hunrrahaba	36	163
Dehra	158	1,110
Jamorhi	280	3,668
Bharkuriya	85	179
Mathiya	30	604
Bilkhoriya	104	523
Amathu	83	2,045
Durga Dih	37	1,944
Dhawan	105	2,746
Morauna	260	3,000
Kastar	232	1,738
Inrath Khurd	169	1,792
Inrath Kalan	121	1,200
Noawan	201	2,397
Bargaiyan	31	473
Mohni	302	4,421
Shiwpur	238	4,346
Siarua	158	833
Kukur Dih	45	7
Baruna	89	1,902
Turti	231	1,791
Dumariya	150	13
Silauta	89	420
Basgitiya	168	1,683
Parariya	174	800
Dumariya	69	371
Kolha	75	573
Baluahi	83	1,040
Padumanpur	69	223
Manpur	153	1,156
Semra	94	1,111
Jogia	71	712
Parsamadhopur	75	514
Kajhai	104	1,844
Lokaya	40	707
Dehri Udai	90	664
Ghosiya Khurd	134	1,233
Sahejani	96	294
Reriya	253	2,004
Gopalpur	49	227
Kanda Dih	142	1,041
Balchanwan	50	547
Dafal Dih	66	77
Salempur	143	2,000
Barna	60	1,083
Jonhi	416	5,059
Khalariya	81	1,433
Atpa	30	225
Gotpa	99	1,800
Lewajit	100	181
Ghusia	422	8,567
Purandarpur	131	269
Lachhmanpur	133	846
Matuli	166	945
Mani	558	4,455
Niga	249	1,988
Ramna Dihra	211	2,154
Keshodih	45	1,249
