= Bihar State Road Development Corporation Limited =

Road Development Corporation In Bihar

BIhar State Road Development Corporation Limited
- Type: Public limited company
- Industry: Road construction
- Headquarters: RCD Mech. Workshop Campus, Sheikhpura, Patna – 800 014
- Area served: Bihar
- Key people: Mihir Kumar Singh (IAS) (Chairman); Saurabh Jorawal, (IAS) (Managing Director)
- Owner: Government of Bihar
- Website: bsrdcl.bihar.gov.in

The Bihar State Road Development Corporation Limited (BSRDCL) is an Indian public limited company fully owned by the Government of Bihar. BSRDC was established on April 20, 2009, and incorporated as a public limited company under the Companies Act 1956 on February 17, 2009. This company was established to promote surface infrastructure by taking up road works, bridges, etc., and to improve the road network by taking up construction widening and strengthening of roads, construction of bridges, maintenance of roads, etc. in the state of Bihar.

== Departments ==
The BSRDC has the following departments:

- Administration
- Engineering
- Toll monitoring
- Lands
- Accounts/finance
- Commercial

== Notable projects ==
- Atal Path
- JP Ganga Path
- Nitish Setu
- Patli Path

== See also ==
- Infrastructure Development Authority Bihar
