= List of villages in Bhojpur district =

Bhojpur district is one of the 38 districts of Bihar state, India.

This is list of villages of Bhojpur district according to respective 14 blocks.

== Agiaon ==
1. Agiaon
2. Ahila
3. Akurha
4. Amarpur
5. Anantpur
6. Araila
7. Baghi
8. Banauli
9. Bankat
10. Bargaon
11. Barhampur Mehdanra
12. Baruna
13. Berath
14. Bhagwanpur
15. Bhaluni
16. Bhikhampur
17. Bisambharpur
18. Bisamhra
19. Chansi
20. Chauria
21. Chhaprapur
22. Chilhar
23. Chipura
24. Chiraili
25. Dhakni
26. Dhobha
27. Dihra
28. Dilia
29. Dumaria
30. Dundhua
31. Ekauna
32. Ekauni
33. Gordiha
34. Gorpa
35. Isarpura
36. Kamaria
37. Karbasin
38. Kashipur Chamari
39. Keshwarpur
40. Khaneth
41. Kharaich
42. Kharainacha
43. Kheri
44. Khopira
45. Kirkiri
46. Laharpa
47. Lahauripur
48. Lasarhi
49. Madhopur
50. Mahpur
51. Maranpur
52. Megharia
53. Misraulia
54. Muradpur
55. Muzaffarpur
56. Nadhi
57. Narainaganj
58. Narauni
59. Narayanpur
60. Nonaur
61. Paharpur Khurd
62. Panwar
63. Paswan
64. Pauna
65. Ranni
66. Ratnarh
67. Rudarpur
68. Sauna
69. Seothara
70. Sewantha
71. Situhari
72. Tara Chak

== Arrah ==
1. Agarsanda
2. Alimullah Chak
3. Alipur
4. Amarpur Marwatia
5. Amma
6. Arrah (M Corp.)
7. Babhnauli
8. Baghakol
9. Baghipakar
10. Bahira Chak
11. Bairampur
12. Bakharia
13. Bakhria
14. Bakula
15. Balua
16. Balua
17. Bara
18. Basantpur
19. Basantpur
20. Basantpur
21. Basmanpur
22. Behra
23. Bela
24. Belghat
25. Bhadea
26. Bhakura
27. Bheldumra
28. Bhojpur
29. Bhusahula
30. Chamukha
31. Chanda
32. Chatarsainpur
33. Chauki
34. Chit Kundi
35. Dalan Chhapra
36. Dariapur
37. Daulatpur
38. Deorhi
39. Dhamar
40. Dharampura
41. Dharampura
42. Dhauandhua
43. Dhobaha
44. Dokti
45. Dularpur Kosik
46. Duraundha
47. Ganauli
48. Ganghar
49. Garaiyan
50. Gazipur
51. Gheghta
52. Ghoradei
53. Gothahula
54. Hasanpura
55. Horlahi
56. Ijri
57. Jadopur
58. Jamira
59. Jura
60. Karari
61. Karra
62. Karwa
63. Khushhalpur
64. Kunria
65. Kurwa
66. Lachhmanpur
67. Lakshanpur
68. Mahadewa
69. Mahazi Dokti
70. Mahkampur Bara
71. Mahuli
72. Mainpura
73. Makhdumpur Dumra
74. Mathaulia
75. Mathurapur
76. Milki
77. Mirza Beg
78. Misraulia
79. Mohanpur
80. Nagopur
81. Nayagaon
82. Nirmalpur
83. Parkhotampur
84. Pathanpur
85. Paut
86. Pipra
87. Pipra
88. Pipra
89. Piprahiya
90. Piraunta
91. Ramdih Chhapra
92. Rampur
93. Rampur Mathia
94. Ramsara Chandar Chur
95. Ratan Dularpur
96. Ratanpur
97. Rokaiya Chak
98. Saidpur
99. Sakatpura
100. Salempur
101. Santpur
102. Sarangpur
103. Sarsiwan
104. Semaria
105. Singhai
106. Singhi Tola
107. Sobhi Dumra
108. Sonadia
109. Sonadia
110. Sonadia
111. Sukulpur
112. Sundarpur Barja
113. Teksemar
114. Tenua
115. Tetaria
116. Tulshipur
117. Udaipur
118. khajuria

== Barhara ==
1. Achhai Chak
2. Agarpura
3. Akauna
4. Babhangawan
5. Babura
6. Bakhorapur
7. Bakhorapur English
8. Balua
9. Barhara
10. Bhusahula
11. Bishambharpur
12. Bishunpur
13. Chatar
14. Chhinegaon
15. Deorath
16. Dokti (Ditto)
17. Dost Muhammad Chak
18. English
19. Faizullah Chak
20. Galchaur
21. Gangauli
22. Gazipur Farhada
23. Ghanghar
24. Gunri
25. Gunri
26. Gyanpur
27. Humaun Chak
28. Jagatpur
29. Jalali Chak
30. Jhokipur
31. Jokahri
32. Karja
33. Kazi Chak
34. Keotia
35. Keshopur
36. Khawaspur
37. Khawaspur
38. Khawaspur
39. Khawaspur
40. Khawaspur
41. Kondarha Uparwar (Ditto)
42. Krishnagarh
43. Kudaria
44. Kuiya
45. Latif Chak
46. Lauhar
47. Lauhar
48. Mah Chak
49. Mahazi Dokti (Ditto)
50. Majhauli
51. Mariam Chak
52. Matukpur
53. Milki
54. Milki Mir Chhaka
55. Molna Chak
56. Nargada
57. Nathmalpur
58. Neknam tola
59. Nurpur
60. Paiga
61. Pakri
62. Panditpur
63. Parasrampur
64. Pharna
65. Piparpanti
66. Raepur Binganwan
67. Raghunathpur (Ditto)
68. Ram Shahar
69. Rampur
70. Rampur Kondarha (Ditto)
71. Ramsagar
72. Sanjoel
73. Saraiya
74. Semaria Jionarain
75. Semaria Pararia
76. Sheo Diara (Ditto)
77. Shivpur
78. Sinha
79. Sohra
80. Turki

== Behea ==
1. Amiya
2. Amrai
3. Andar
4. Andauli
5. Bagahin
6. Banahin
7. Bandha
8. Bankat
9. Bankat
10. Bara
11. Baruna
12. Basdeopur
13. Behea (NP)
14. Bela
15. Belauna
16. Bharsanda Jado
17. Bharsanda Mangit
18. Bhinriya
19. Bhoja Chak
20. Bibi Mah Chak
21. Bikrampur
22. Bikrampur
23. Birpur
24. Chakwath
25. Chaughara
26. Dalpatpur
27. Dariwan
28. Dhanikara
29. Dharhara
30. Doghra
31. Dubauli
32. Dusadhi Chak
33. Gajrar
34. Garhatha
35. Gaudar Chak Tal
36. Gaudar Rudar Nagar
37. Ghagha
38. Hirdepur
39. Itwa
40. Jadopur
41. Jamua
42. Jogibir
43. Kaleyanpur
44. Kamriaon
45. Kanela
46. Kaneli
47. Kanhai Geyan Sinh
48. Karkhiyan
49. Katea
50. Kauriya
51. Kawalpura
52. Kewal Patti
53. Khakhu Bandh
54. Kharauni
55. Kuardah
56. Kundesar
57. Lagantola
58. Mahuaon
59. Makhdumpur
60. Maniara
61. Marinpur
62. Marwatia
63. Maujhali
64. Meha Chak
65. Misrauli
66. Mohanpur
67. Moti Rampur
68. Nainagarha
69. Narayanpur
70. Narayanpur
71. Nausha Tanr
72. Nawada
73. Nawadih
74. Osain
75. Pahari Pipra
76. Parariya
77. Patkhaulia
78. Phingi
79. Phulai
80. Pipra Jagdis
81. Rajaur
82. Ramdatahi
83. Ramdubwal
84. Rampur
85. Rani Sagar
86. Rati Dubawal
87. Rustampur
88. Sahjauli
89. Saho Dih
90. Samardah
91. Sharaur
92. Shiupur
93. Sikariya
94. Sirampur
95. Sukhari Chak
96. Sukrauli
97. Teghra
98. Tetariya
99. Tiar
100. Tikhpur

== Charpokhari ==
1. Amurza
2. Babu bandh
3. Bagahi
4. Bagu sara
5. Bajen
6. Balihari
7. Barahra
8. Barar
9. Barar English
10. Barni
11. Betari
12. Bhairo Dih
13. Bhaluana
14. Bharhatha
15. Chakiya
16. Chand Dihri
17. Charpokhri
18. Dego Dehri
19. Dekura
20. Dhanauti
21. Dherha
22. Dhob Diha
23. Dhusra
24. Dube Dehra
25. Dubea
26. Dumariya
27. Ekauni
28. Gangajal Dehri
29. Gauri Dih
30. Harpur
31. Itaura
32. Jairampur
33. Jaitpura
34. Janea Dih
35. Kalianpur
36. Kanai
37. Kashi Dih
38. Kasmariya
39. Kathrain
40. Kathrain Milik
41. Kauwa Khot
42. Keshopur
43. Kharanti
44. Kinu Dehri
45. Koel
46. Koel Arazi
47. Kori
48. Kumhaila
49. Kusamhi
50. Lilari
51. Madain
52. Madanpur
53. Madarha
54. Madarhi
55. Madariha
56. Madhuri
57. Majhiawan
58. Makundpur
59. Malaur
60. Malipur
61. Manaini
62. Mansagar
63. Nagraon
64. Nagri
65. Narotimpur
66. Pachma
67. Paliya
68. Panraria
69. Panre Dih
70. Pasaur
71. Patkhauli
72. Pem Akurha
73. Piro Chak
74. Pirtampur
75. Rampur
76. Rasulpur
77. Repura
78. Repura
79. Sahaspura
80. Sarbahan Dehri
81. Saropur
82. Semraon
83. Siya Dih
84. Sonbarsa
85. Sukru
86. Sundarpur
87. Tetaria
88. Thakuri
89. Thegua
90. Udhwa Dih

== Garhani ==
1. Akrahi
2. Azam Nagar
3. Bagwa
4. Bahadurpur
5. Bahri
6. Balbandh
7. Baligaon
8. Barap
9. Baraura
10. Bardiha
11. Bhatauli
12. Bhinrari
13. Chaiyan Chak
14. Chandi
15. Dehri
16. Deodhi
17. Deopur
18. Dhamanian
19. Dhandhauli
20. Dhokraha
21. Dolaur Dehri
22. Dubauli
23. Dularpur
24. Garhani
25. Garhani Taluk
26. Gaura
27. Hadia Bad
28. Harpur
29. Ichari
30. Karnaul
31. Kaup
32. Kurkuri
33. Labhuani
34. Lakarsen
35. Mandura
36. Manduri
37. Morasia
38. Mukundpur
39. Paharpur
40. Pararia
41. Pathar
42. Pipra
43. Ram Dihra
44. Rampur
45. Ratanpur
46. Sahangi
47. Shivpur
48. Sihar
49. Sikaria
50. Sikti
51. Sohari
52. Suaraha
53. Suari
54. Tenduni

== Jagdishpur ==
1. Aer
2. Afzalpur
3. Anharibag
4. Araila
5. Asodhan
6. Asodhar
7. Babhniyawan
8. Bachri
9. Bahuwara
10. Bairahi
11. Baluwanhi
12. Bankat
13. Bara Pokhar
14. Barad Parwa
15. Bariar Patti
16. Barnaon
17. Basauna
18. Bharsara
19. Bhatauli
20. BichlaJangalMahalJagdishpur
21. Bimawan
22. Chakwa
23. Dalippur
24. Danwan
25. Deorar
26. Dhaka Karam
27. Dhangain
28. Dihri
29. Dilia
30. Diliya
31. Diul
32. Dubhar
33. Dulaur
34. Gangadhar Dehri
35. Geyanpura
36. Gurez
37. Hardiya
38. Harigaon
39. Harna Tanr
40. Hathpokhar
41. Hetampur
42. Isanri
43. Jagdishpur (NP)
44. Jamui Horil
45. Jamui Khanr
46. Kahen
47. Kakila
48. Kali Bali
49. Kataibojh
50. Kaunra
51. Kesari
52. Khutaha
53. Kinnu Dehri
54. Korhwa
55. Kunai
56. Kusaha
57. Kusamha
58. Lahijohar
59. Lakhanpura
60. Mahurahi
61. Mangitpur
62. Mangura
63. Manhtati
64. Manjhupur
65. Mannu Dehri
66. Masurhi
67. Mathurapur
68. Misrauliya
69. Mungaul
70. Narayanpur
71. Neur Pokhar
72. Paliya
73. Paliya Chak
74. Panapur
75. Parasiya
76. Pipra
77. Rangarua
78. Repura
79. Saniya Barahta
80. Shiupur
81. Siyaruwa
82. Sonbarsa
83. Sondhi
84. Sultanpur
85. Sundara
86. Tenduni
87. Tikthi
88. Tulsi
89. Ugna
90. Ujiyarpur
91. UtarwariJangalMahalJagdishpur
92. Uttardaha

== Koilwar ==
1. Amma Narbirpur
2. Babhnauli
3. Bahiyara
4. Bakar Nagar
5. Bhadwar
6. Bhagwatpur
7. Bhopatpur
8. Birampur
9. Bishunpur
10. Bishunpura
11. Chanda
12. Chandi
13. Chandwa
14. Chhitampur
15. Daulatpur
16. Deoria
17. Dhan Diha
18. Dhandiha
19. Dumaria
20. Farhangpur
21. Giddha
22. Golakpur
23. Gopalpur
24. Guri
25. Gyanpur
26. Haripur
27. Imadpur
28. Jahanpur
29. Jalpura
30. Jalpura Tapa
31. Jamalpur
32. Jogta
33. Kaem Nagar
34. Kazi Chak
35. Khangaon
36. Khesrahiya
37. Kiratpura
38. Kishunpura
39. Koilwar (NP)
40. Kulharia
41. Kusihan
42. Lodipur
43. Mahui
44. Majhauwan
45. Makhdumpur
46. Makhdumpur Semra
47. Mana Chak
48. Manikpur
49. Manpur
50. Mathurapur
51. Milki
52. Mirapur
53. Mohaddi Chak
54. Mohkampur
55. Mokhalsa
56. Narbirpur
57. Narhi
58. Pachaina
59. Pachrukhia
60. Purdilganj
61. Rajapur
62. Raundh Santpur
63. Sadasibpur Urf Sabdalpur
64. Sakaddi
65. Sirari Chak
66. Sirpalpur
67. Sirpalpur
68. Songhatta
69. Sundarpur
70. Sundra
71. Suraudha
72. kamalu Chak

== Piro ==
1. Agiaon
2. Akrua
3. Amai
4. Amehta
5. Angra
6. Anuwan
7. Bachri
8. Baghaunr
9. Bahri Mahadeo
10. Baisa Dih
11. Bamhawar
12. Barao
13. Barauli
14. Baraura
15. Basdiha
16. Baseya
17. Basmanpur
18. Bedauli
19. Beduwa
20. Bharsar
21. Bhulkua
22. Birpur
23. Bishambharpur
24. Chanwa
25. Chaubepur
26. Chhaurahi Jangal Mahal
27. Chhechhu Dih
28. Chilbilia
29. Dano Dih
30. Danwarua
31. Deochanda
32. Dhan Pokhar
33. Dhanpura
34. Dihri
35. Doman Dehra
36. Ear
37. Gajra Dih
38. Garahatha
39. Gobind Dih
40. Gogsand
41. Harpur
42. Haswa Dehri
43. Hat Pokhar
44. Indarpatpur
45. Itamba Ganesh
46. Jagdeopur
47. Jagdishpur Patak
48. Jaisingh Dih
49. Jamaurahi
50. Jamuaon
51. Jamunipur
52. Jitaura Jangal Mahal
53. Kachhuhi
54. Kachnath
55. Karauniya
56. Kaser
57. Katar
58. Kataria
59. Keshwa
60. Kewatia
61. Khairahin
62. Khambha Dih
63. Khandani
64. Khandani Khurd
65. Kheri Kon
66. Khorain
67. Kothua
68. Kukrahan
69. Lahthan
70. Lohain
71. Lohrabad
72. Mahuari
73. Mahwari
74. Manaini
75. Marohi
76. Mothi
77. Mothibal Jangal Mahal
78. Moti Dih
79. Naek Tola Jangal Mahal
80. Narayanpur
81. Narayanpur
82. Narhi
83. Newari
84. Nonar
85. Pachman
86. Pachrukhia
87. Pharaura
88. Piro (NP)
89. Pitat
90. Pitro
91. Puraini Buzurg
92. Puraini Khurd
93. Rajapur
94. Rajeyan
95. Rangal Tola Jangal Mahal
96. Rasauli
97. Sahejani
98. Salakhna
99. Saneya
100. Sugibal
101. Sukhrauli
102. Tar
103. Telar
104. Tetar Dih
105. Tewari Dih
106. Tilath
107. Tiwari Dih
108. Udan Dih
109. Ujjain Dehra
110. Waina

== Sahar ==
1. Abgilla
2. Amruhan
3. Andhari
4. Andhari Mahazi
5. Anuwa
6. Athpa
7. Bagaunti
8. Bahuara
9. Bajrean
10. Bansi Dehri
11. Baruhi
12. Bhopatpur
13. Bishunpura
14. Chak Chaudhari
15. Chauri
16. Chhatarpura
17. Dehri
18. Dhanchhuhan
19. Dharampur
20. Dhauri
21. Dhauri Chak
22. Ekwari
23. Fatehpur
24. Gulzarpur
25. Harpur
26. Hatimganj
27. Inurkhi
28. Jagdish Chak
29. Janaidih
30. Janpuria
31. Jot Gobind
32. Kanpahari
33. Karbasin
34. Kaul Dehri
35. Khaira
36. Kharaon Buzurg
37. Kharaon Chaturbhuj
38. Koni
39. Koriar
40. Kunrwa
41. Kusiar
42. Lodipur
43. Mahabirganj
44. Mathurapur
45. Newada
46. Nima
47. Ojhaulia
48. Patarpura
49. Patrihan
50. Perhap
51. Peur
52. Peur Chak
53. Purhara
54. Sahar
55. Sakhuana
56. Shiw Chak

== Sandesh ==
1. Ahiman Chak
2. Ahpura
3. Akhgaon
4. Baga
5. Balra
6. Bara
7. Baranhpur
8. Bardiha
9. Bartiar
10. Basauri
11. Bhanpura
12. Bhatauli
13. Bhikham Chak
14. Bichhiaon
15. Chanchar
16. Chauria
17. Chela
18. Chilhauns
19. Dalelganj
20. Dehri
21. Deoar
22. Dharampur
23. Dihra
24. Gaighat
25. Jamuaon
26. Jansara
27. Kanharpur
28. Khandaul
29. Khemkaranpur
30. Kholpur
31. Kori
32. Kosdihra
33. Kusra
34. Lodipur
35. Mahadeopur
36. Maniach
37. Nansagar
38. Narainpur
39. Nasratpur
40. Panpura
41. Panrepur
42. Partappur
43. Parura
44. Parura Rampur
45. Patkhaulia
46. Phulari
47. Pinjroi
48. Raman Sanrh
49. Salempur
50. Sandesh
51. Sarimpur Bachri
52. Surungapur
53. Turkaul
54. Udaibhanpur

== Shahpur ==
1. Abatana
2. Baharwar
3. Bahoranpur Bazar (Ditto)
4. Bahoranpur Dakhinwar
5. Bahoranpur Diara (Ditto)
6. Bamhnauli
7. Bansipur
8. Barmhapa
9. Barsaun
10. Basdeopur
11. Beas Chak
12. Belauthi
13. Bhainsaha
14. Bharauli
15. Bhikhampur
16. Bhim Patti
17. Bhimpatti
18. Bhusahula (Ditto)
19. Bimari
20. Bishunpur
21. Bishunpur
22. Bishunpur (Ditto)
23. Chaki Nauranga
24. ChakkiNauranga MasumeMahaziRam Karhi
25. ChakkiNaurangaMahaz Rashulpur
26. ChakkiNaurangaMasumeRasulpur Ramkarhi
27. ChakkiNaurangaOjhwaliaDiara
28. Chamarpur
29. Chanchar
30. Chanda
31. Char Ghat
32. Chicharampur (Ditto)
33. Damodarpur (Ditto)
34. Deomalpur
35. Dewaich Kundi
36. Dharmangatpur
37. Dhauri
38. Dhiratpura
39. Dhokaria Chak
40. Dilmanpur
41. Domariya
42. Dudh Ghat
43. Dumariya
44. Gabindpur
45. Gangapur (Ditto)
46. Garaya
47. Gashainpur
48. Gaura
49. Gobindpur
50. Goreriya (Ditto)
51. Gosainpur
52. Hariharpur
53. Harkhi Pipra
54. Isharpura
55. Isharpura Naubarar (Ditto)
56. Jagdeopur
57. Jaugarh
58. Jawania (Ditto)
59. Jhaua
60. Kadam Ka Dera (Ditto)
61. Karanpura
62. Kariman ThakurKaDera (Ditto)
63. Karja
64. Karnamenpur
65. Kazi Chak
66. Keotiya
67. Khagraha
68. Kharaun
69. Khutaha
70. Kunriya
71. Lachatola Bersingha (Ditto)
72. Lachhmanpur
73. LachhmiAhirKaDera (Ditto)
74. Lalu Ahir Ka Dera (Ditto)
75. Lashkara
76. Lat
77. Lilari
78. Madhopur (Ditto)
79. Mahapur
80. Maharaja
81. Mahazi Dokti (Ditto)
82. Mahuar Inglish
83. Manoharpur
84. Mansa Chak
85. Mansinghpur
86. Milki Gopalpur
87. Mirchaiya Ka Dera (Ditto)
88. Misrauliya
89. Mohji Nardarai (Ditto)
90. Nandlal Ka Dera (Ditto)
91. Nandpur
92. Nardara Khas
93. Nargada
94. Nathpae
95. Nipania (Ditto)
96. Pachkauri Ka Dera (Ditto)
97. Paharpur
98. Pakri
99. Panrepur
100. Parariya
101. Parsonda
102. Parsotimpur
103. Parsotimpur (Ditto)
104. Parsram- patti
105. Patti Siswa
106. Pipra Ganesh (Ditto)
107. Pursotampur (Ditto)
108. Rajauli
109. Raksaur
110. Ram Dayal Ka Dera (Ditto)
111. Ram Karhi (Ditto)
112. Ramchandar Semaria
113. Ramdatahi
114. Ramdihra
115. Randa Dih
116. Repura (Ditto)
117. Sahjauli
118. Saiya Ka Dera (Ditto)
119. Salempur Diara (Ditto)
120. Salempur Mahazi (Ditto)
121. Sarangpur (Ditto)
122. Sarna
123. Semariya Palti Ojha
124. Shahpur (NP)
125. Sobhanathhi (Ditto)
126. Sonbarsa
127. Sonbarsa Diar (Ditto)
128. Sonki
129. Sugar Chapra (Ditto)
130. Suhiya
131. Suremarpur (Ditto)
132. Tapsi Ka Dera (Ditto)
133. Tika Semaria (Ditto)
134. Tikapur
135. Tikthi
136. Udhopur (Ditto)
137. Udhopur (Ditto)
138. Zamin Fazil (Ditto)

== Tarari ==
1. Adhar Dih
2. Afzal Chak
3. Akraunj
4. Amaharua
5. Bagar
6. Baghsanda
7. Bahadurpur
8. Balua
9. Bandhwa
10. Barka Gaon
11. Basauri
12. Basra
13. Beldehri
14. Berain
15. Bhadsera
16. Bhakura
17. Bheriya
18. Bhopatpur
19. Bihta
20. Bipan Dih
21. Birhar
22. Bishamharpur
23. Bishunpura
24. Burhi Jethwar
25. Chakia
26. Chanda
27. Dari Dih
28. Deo
29. Deo Arazi
30. Dewria
31. Dhamna
32. Dhangawan
33. Dharhiya
34. Dihri
35. Dilia
36. Dumaria
37. Durupur
38. Fatehpur
39. Gaharua
40. Gangti
41. Gaura
42. Gazo Dih
43. Gopalpur
44. Gudan Dih
45. Hardiya
46. Harla
47. Harpur
48. Hurrua
49. Imadpur
50. Itahri
51. Itman
52. Jethwar Bhat
53. Kab Dehra
54. Kanu Dih
55. Karath
56. Kariman Chak
57. Karma Misir
58. Khairulla Chak
59. Kharwana
60. Khutaha
61. Kiratpur
62. Kisai Dih
63. Kudariya
64. Kurmorhi
65. Kusdehra
66. Kusumhi
67. Labna
68. Lachchhi Dih
69. Mahadeopur
70. Mahesh Dih
71. Malwe
72. Manikpur
73. Manpur
74. Moap Buzurg
75. Moap Khurd
76. Narayanpur
77. Naua
78. Nawa Dih
79. Nirbhai Dehra
80. Noni Dih
81. Ojha Dih
82. Panwari
83. Paranpura
84. Parariya
85. Parasiya
86. Patelwa
87. Patkhauli
88. Phitko
89. Pipra
90. Rajmal Dih
91. Rajpur
92. Ramnagar
93. Ranni
94. Sadhwa Yakub
95. Sahiara
96. Saidanpur
97. Salempur
98. Salhadia
99. Santokha Chak
100. Sapta Dih
101. Sara
102. Sarphora
103. Sauna
104. Sedha
105. Shankar Dih
106. Sikarhata
107. Sikarhata Khurd
108. Sikarhata Milik
109. Sikraur
110. Sonar Dihri
111. Surmana
112. Tanrwa
113. Tarari
114. Usri
115. Warsi

== Udwant Nagar ==
1. Akhtiarpur
2. Asni
3. Bajruha
4. Bakri
5. Baon Pali
6. Bargahi
7. Basauri
8. Behra Sabalpur
9. Belaur
10. Bhawanpur
11. Bhelain
12. Bhopatpur
13. Bhupauli
14. Bibiganj
15. Birampur
16. Bishunpur
17. Chakia
18. Chaursani
19. Chorain
20. Dariapur
21. Dehri
22. Demhan
23. Deoria
24. Diliya
25. Dubedah
26. Ekauna
27. Eraura
28. Garha
29. Gorhna
30. Harnath Kundi
31. Indarpura
32. Jaitpur
33. Kalyanpur
34. Kari Sath
35. Kasap
36. KawalKundi
37. Khajuata
38. Khalisa
39. Kharauni
40. Khiritanr
41. Konhara
42. Kusamha
43. Kusamhi
44. Madhubani
45. Mahatwania
46. Mahuli Buzurg
47. Mahuli Khurd
48. Malthar
49. Mangatpur
50. Masar
51. Milki
52. Milki
53. Misraulia
54. Morath
55. Nawa Nagar
56. Nawada
57. Nima
58. Pakariabar
59. Patar
60. Piania
61. Pirozpur
62. Raghopur
63. Rampur
64. Sakhua
65. Salthar
66. Saraiya
67. Sarthua
68. Sasram
69. Savgar
70. Sikandarpur
71. Sirampur
72. Sonpura
73. Surni
74. Tetaria
75. Udwantnagar
76. khiritanr Milki
