= Chhinegaon, Bhojpur =

Chhinegaon
- Village
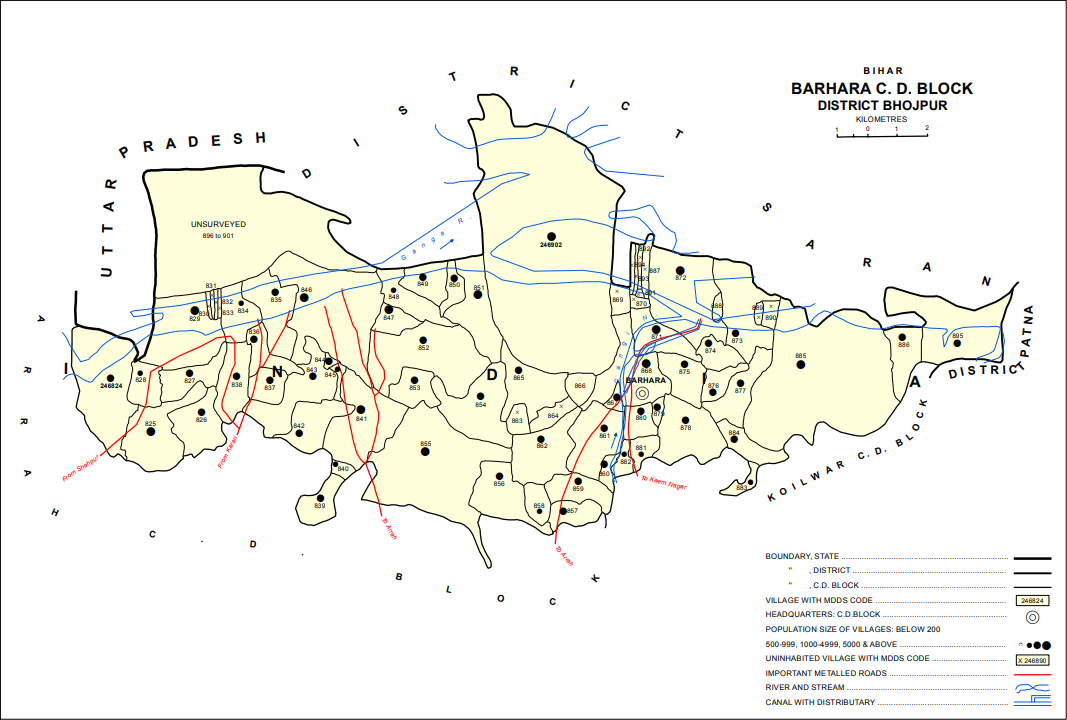
- Map of Chhinegaon (#847) in Barhara block

- Location in Bihar, India Chhinegaon (India)
- Coordinates: 25.69149°N 84.641°E
- Country: India
- State: Bihar
- District: Bhojpur

Area
  - Total: 0.124 km^{2} (0.048 sq mi)
- Elevation: 61 m (200 ft)

Population (2011)
  - Total: 5,375
  - Density: 43,300/km^{2} (112,000/sq mi)

Languages
  - Official: Bhojpuri, Hindi
- Time zone: UTC+5:30 (IST)
- PIN: 802316

Chhinegaon is a village in Barhara block of Bhojpur district in Bihar, India. As of 2011, its population was 5,375, in 805 households.
