= Ramsagar, Barhara =

Ramsagar Rāmsāgar
- Village
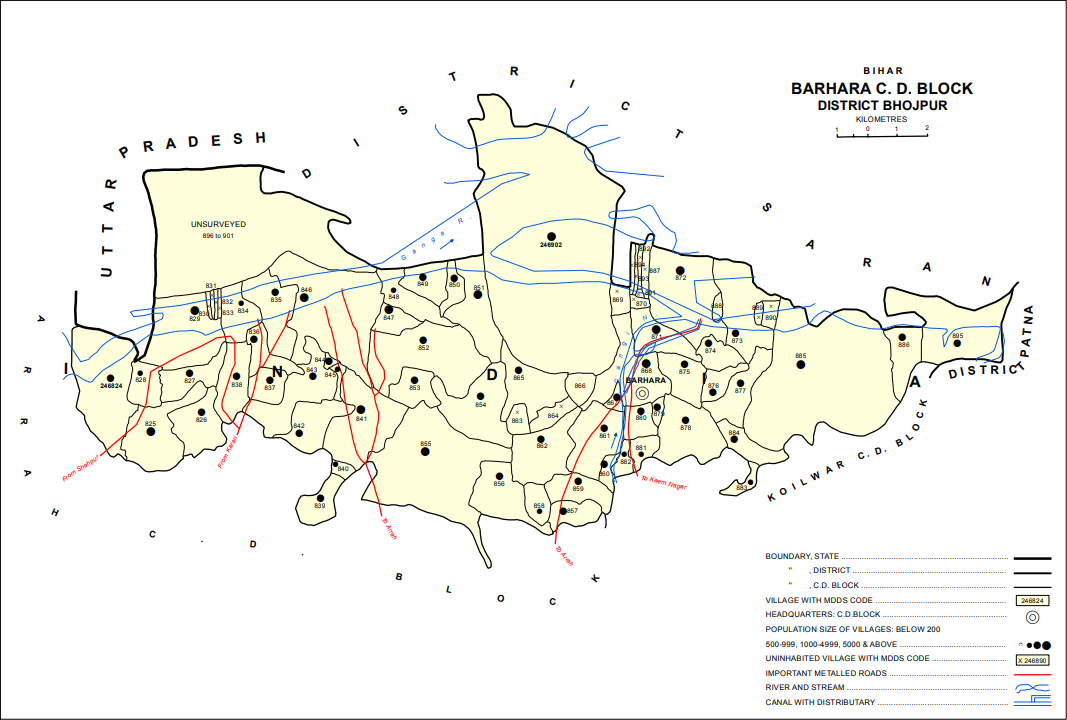
- Map of Ramsagar (#880) in Barhara block

- Location in Bihar, India Ramsagar (India)
- Coordinates: 25.66218°N 84.72612°E
- Country: India
- State: Bihar
- District: Bhojpur

Area
  - Total: 0.116 km^{2} (0.045 sq mi)
- Elevation: 62 m (203 ft)

Population (2011)
  - Total: 2,130
  - Density: 18,400/km^{2} (47,600/sq mi)

Languages
  - Official: Bhojpuri, Hindi
- Time zone: UTC+5:30 (IST)
- PIN: 802311

Ramsagar is a village in Barhara block of Bhojpur district in Bihar, India. As of 2011, its population was 2,130, in 358 households.
