= Babura, Bhojpur =

Babura Bābura
- Village
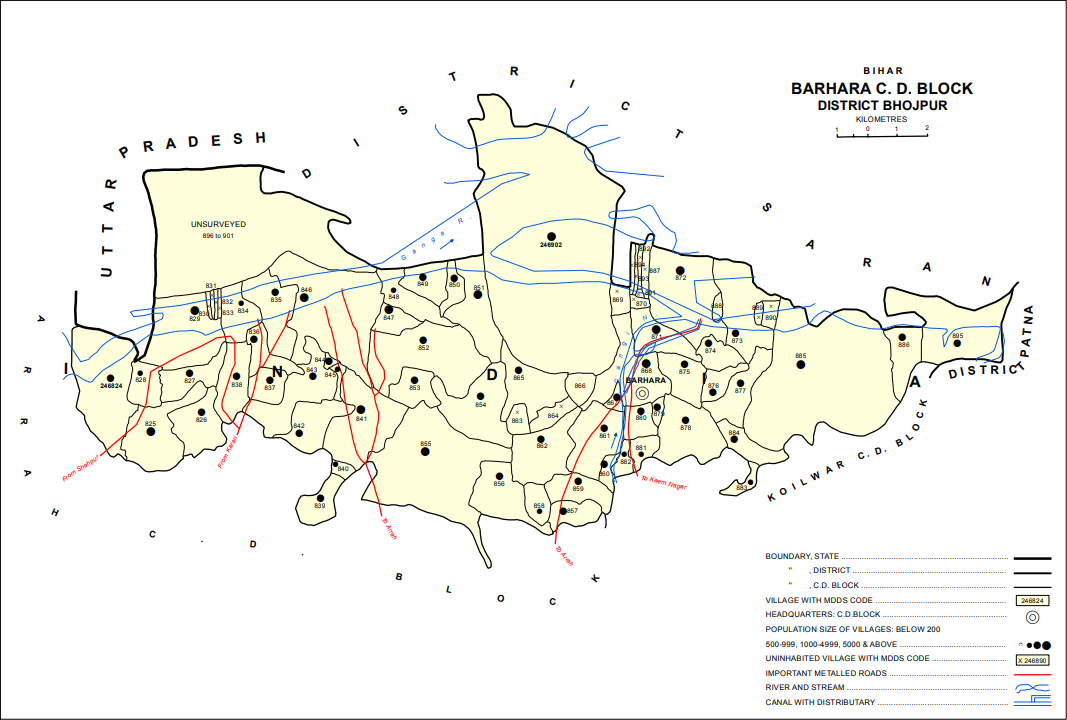
- Map of Babura (#885) in Barhara block

- Location in Bihar, India Babura (India)
- Coordinates: 25.68376°N 84.78254°E
- Country: India
- State: Bihar
- District: Bhojpur

Area
  - Total: 1.842 km^{2} (0.711 sq mi)
- Elevation: 58 m (190 ft)

Population (2011)
  - Total: 28,412
  - Density: 15,420/km^{2} (39,950/sq mi)

Languages
  - Official: Bhojpuri, Hindi
- Time zone: UTC+5:30 (IST)
- PIN: 802311

Babura is a large village in Barhara block of Bhojpur district in Bihar, India. As of 2011, its population was 28,412, in 4,291 households. That year, it was the most populous village in Bhojpur district.
