= Sanjoel =

- Village
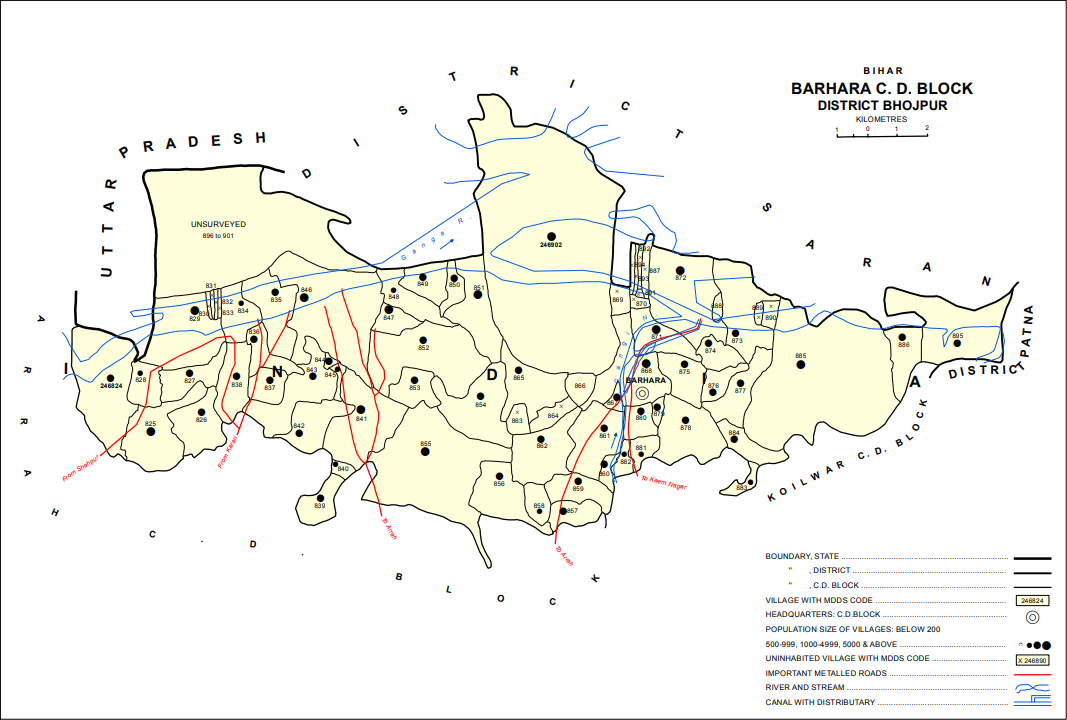
- Map of Sanjoel (#848) in Barhara block

- Location in Bihar, India Sanjoel (India)
- Coordinates: 25.69518°N 84.64282°E
- Country: India
- State: Bihar
- District: Bhojpur

Area
  - Total: 0.189 km^{2} (0.073 sq mi)
- Elevation: 60 m (200 ft)

Population (2011)
  - Total: 806
  - Density: 4,260/km^{2} (11,000/sq mi)

Languages
  - Official: Bhojpuri, Hindi
- Time zone: UTC+5:30 (IST)
- PIN: 802316

Sanjoel is a village in Barhara block of Bhojpur district in Bihar, India. As of 2011, its population was 806, in 111 households.
