= Bandhwa =

Bandhwan
- Village
- Location in Bihar, India Bandhwan (India)
- Coordinates: 25.686683°N 84.722464°E
- Country: India
- State: Bihar
- District: Bhojpur
- Elevation: 74 m (243 ft)

Languages
  - Official: Bhojpuri, Hindi
- Time zone: UTC+5:30 (IST)
- PIN: 802209
- Telephone code: 91-6182
- Vehicle registration: BR-03

Bandhwa is a small village in the Bhojpur district of India. Bandhwa is located in Tarari block of Bhojpur district in Bihar. It has total 431 families residing. Bandhawan has population of 2,340 as per government records.

== Administration ==
Bandhwa village is administered by the Mukhiya through its Gram Panchayat, who is an elected representative of the village as per the Constitution of India and the Panchayati Raj Act. The current Mukhiya of the Panchayat is Jai Prakash Singh, according to a report by Pankaj Kumar, a native of the village.

Particulars	Total	Male	Female
Total No. of Houses	431		
Population	2340	1209	1131

== Economy ==
Bandhwa was the center of sugarcane farming in the era of British India, but nowadays the major sources of income are paddy, wheat, maize and onion.

In the east of the village lies a small river named "KHAUR". In the west side, there is a pond where the festival "CHHATH", a multi-day festival to worship the Sun God, is organized every year. In the north side, there is land for paddy fertilization which the locals call "ZIRAAT". In the south side, a temple is planned to be constructed.

== Nearby places ==
- Buxar
- Arrah
- Dumraon
- Patna
- Piro
- Bikramganj
- Hasanbazar
