= Milki, Barhara =

Milki
- Village
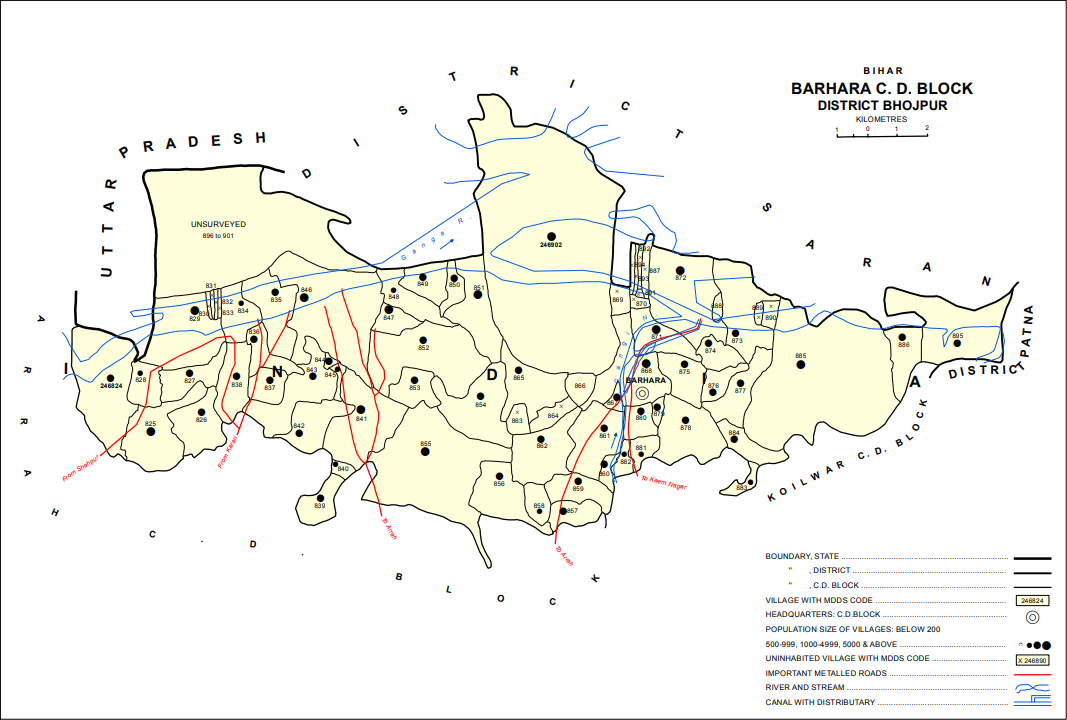
- Map of Milki (#844) in Barhara block

- Location in Bihar, India Milki (India)
- Coordinates: 25.67888°N 84.62102°E
- Country: India
- State: Bihar
- District: Bhojpur

Area
  - Total: 0.020 km^{2} (0.0077 sq mi)
- Elevation: 60 m (200 ft)

Population (2011)
  - Total: 1,748
  - Density: 87,000/km^{2} (230,000/sq mi)

Languages
  - Official: Bhojpuri, Hindi
- Time zone: UTC+5:30 (IST)
- PIN: 802313

Milki is a village in Barhara block of Bhojpur district in Bihar, India. As of 2011, its population was 1,748, in 218 households.
