= Gyanpur, Barhara =

Gyanpur Gyānpur
- Village
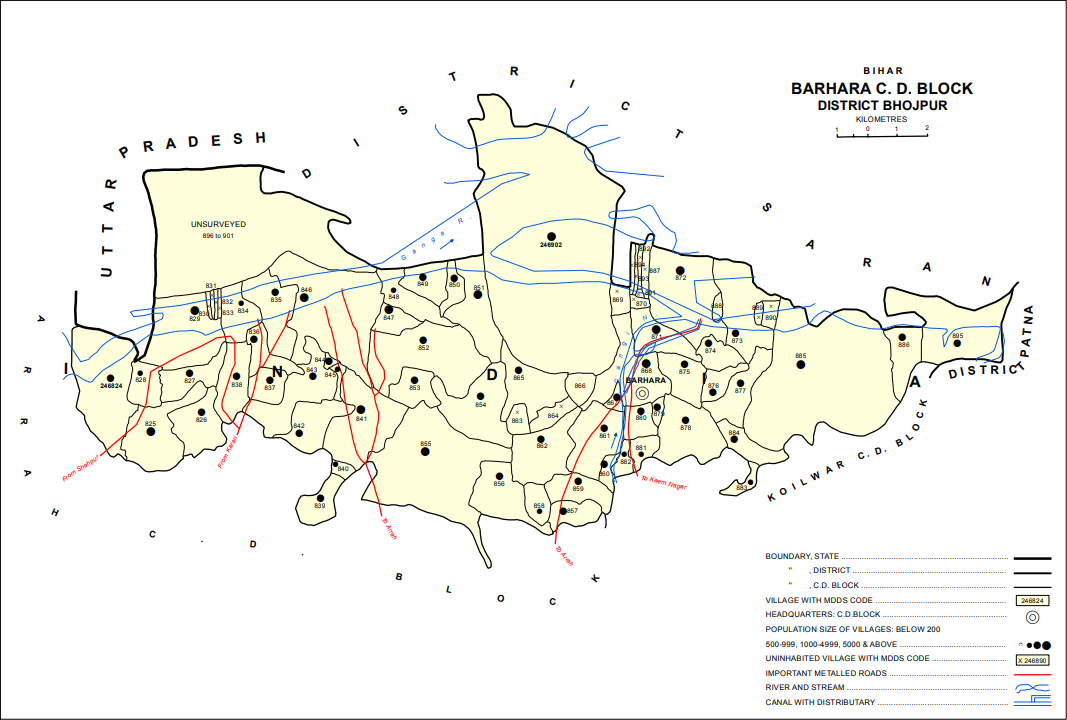
- Map of Gyanpur (#849) in Barhara block

- Location in Bihar, India Gyanpur (India)
- Coordinates: 25.6955°N 84.65303°E
- Country: India
- State: Bihar
- District: Bhojpur

Area
  - Total: 0.157 km^{2} (0.061 sq mi)
- Elevation: 58 m (190 ft)

Population (2011)
  - Total: 2,381
  - Density: 15,200/km^{2} (39,300/sq mi)

Languages
  - Official: Bhojpuri, Hindi
- Time zone: UTC+5:30 (IST)
- PIN: 802316

Gyanpur is a village in Barhara block of Bhojpur district in Bihar, India. As of 2011, its population was 2,381, in 386 households.
