= Keotia =

Keotia Keotiya
- Village
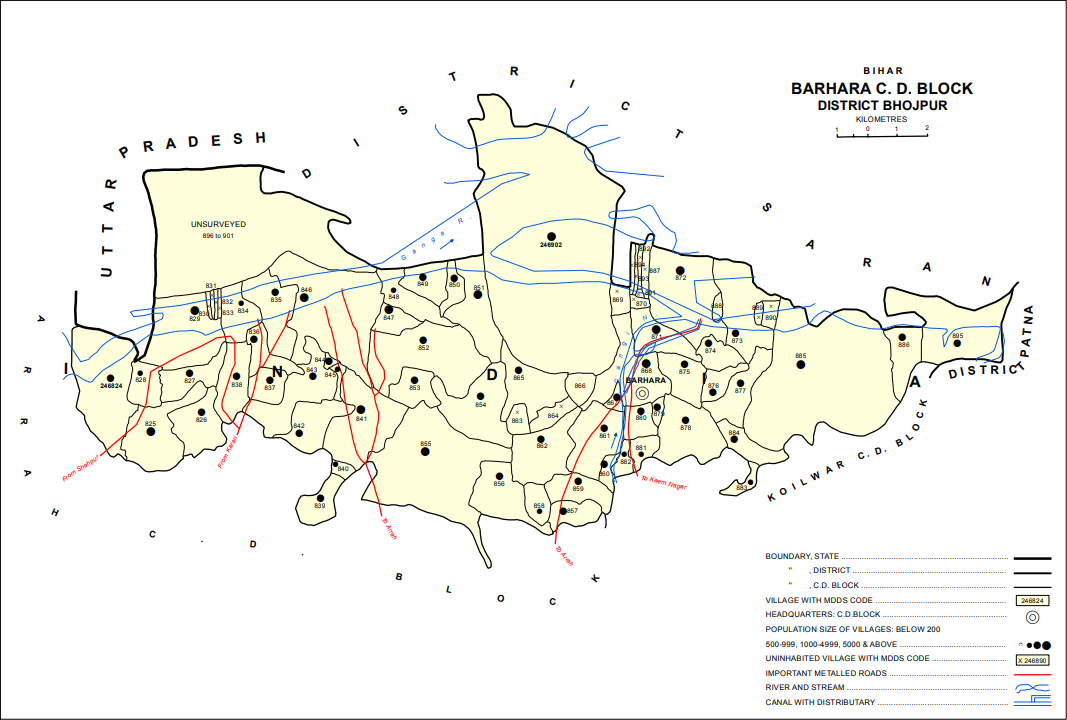
- Map of Keotia (#828) in Barhara block

- Location in Bihar, India Keotia (India)
- Coordinates: 25.66554°N 84.56384°E
- Country: India
- State: Bihar
- District: Bhojpur

Area
  - Total: 0.159 km^{2} (0.061 sq mi)
- Elevation: 62 m (203 ft)

Population (2011)
  - Total: 954
  - Density: 6,000/km^{2} (15,500/sq mi)

Languages
  - Official: Bhojpuri, Hindi
- Time zone: UTC+5:30 (IST)
- PIN: 802316

Keotia, also spelled Keotiya, is a village in Barhara block of Bhojpur district in Bihar, India. As of 2011, its population was 954, in 115 households.
