= Jagatpur, Barhara =

Jagatpur
- Village
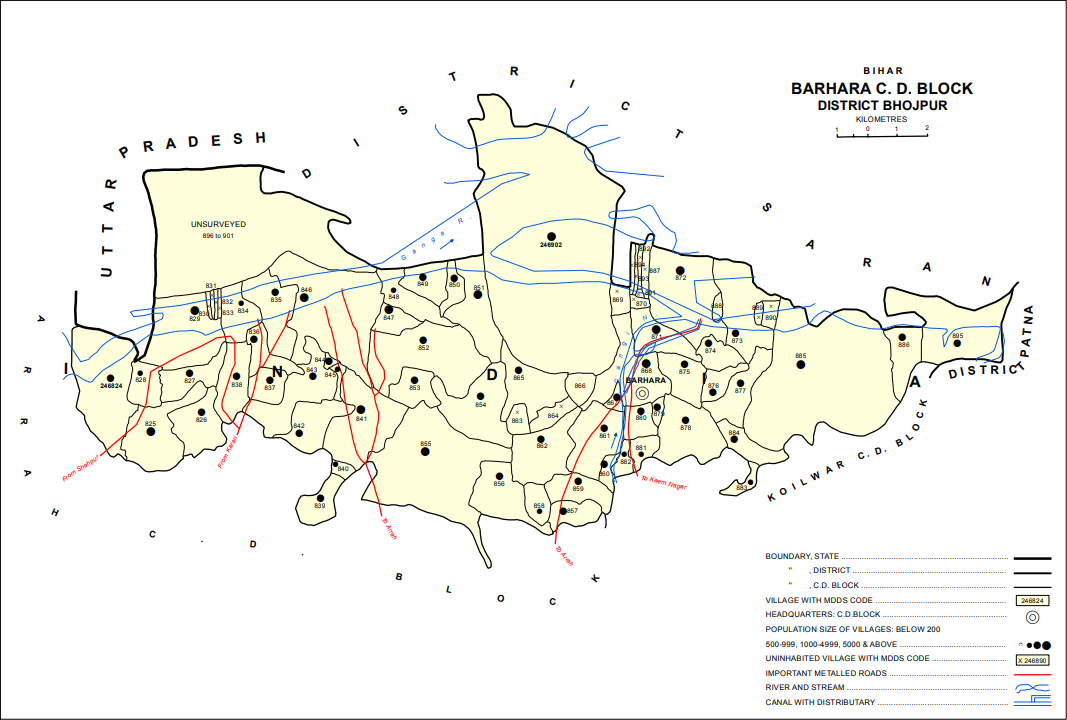
- Map of Jagatpur (#837) in Barhara block

- Location in Bihar, India Jagatpur (India)
- Coordinates: 25.67113°N 84.59759°E
- Country: India
- State: Bihar
- District: Bhojpur

Area
  - Total: 0.110 km^{2} (0.042 sq mi)
- Elevation: 61 m (200 ft)

Population (2011)
  - Total: 1,975
  - Density: 18,000/km^{2} (46,500/sq mi)

Languages
  - Official: Bhojpuri, Hindi
- Time zone: UTC+5:30 (IST)
- PIN: 802316

Jagatpur is a village in Barhara block of Bhojpur district in Bihar, India. As of 2011, its population was 1,975, in 314 households.
