= Parasrampur, Bhojpur =

Parasrampur Parasrāmpur
- Village
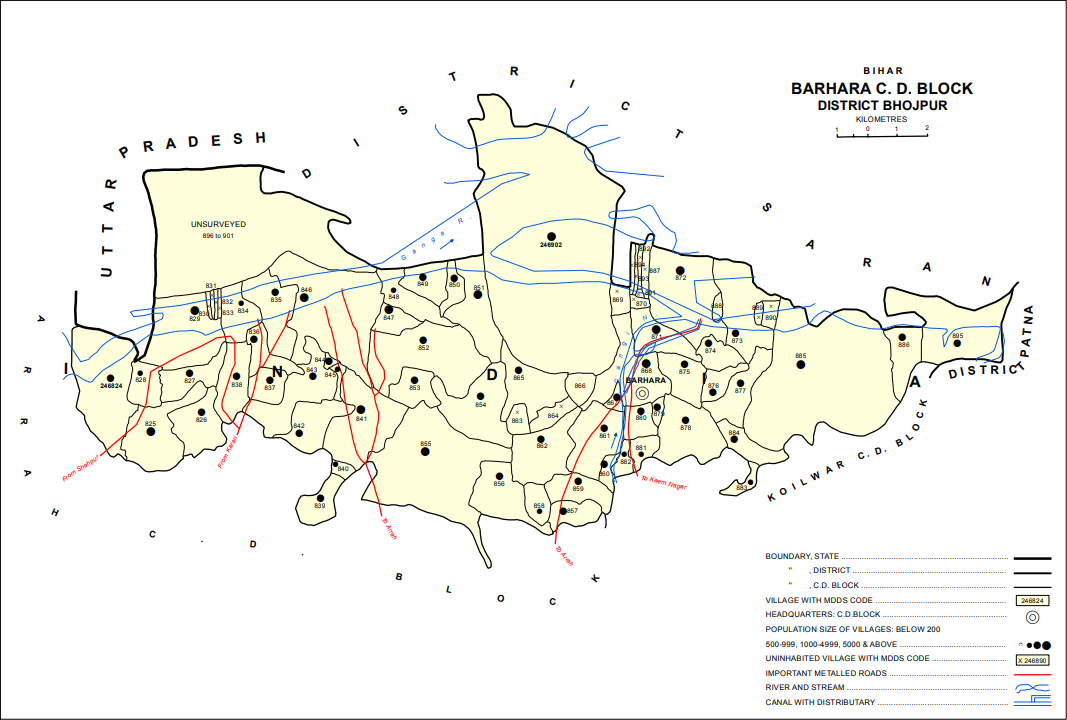
- Map of Parasrampur (#835) in Barhara block

- Location in Bihar, India Parasrampur (India)
- Coordinates: 25.68163°N 84.60319°E
- Country: India
- State: Bihar
- District: Bhojpur

Area
  - Total: 0.291 km^{2} (0.112 sq mi)
- Elevation: 61 m (200 ft)

Population (2011)
  - Total: 1,548
  - Density: 5,320/km^{2} (13,800/sq mi)

Languages
  - Official: Bhojpuri, Hindi
- Time zone: UTC+5:30 (IST)
- PIN: 802316

Parasrampur is a village in Barhara block of Bhojpur district in Bihar, India. As of 2011, its population was 1,548, in 185 households.
