= Lakshanpur =

Coordinates: 20°35′N 84°30′E

Lakshanpur is a village in the Bhojpur district of Bihar, India. The village falls under the post office named Jamira and its panchayet's name is also Jamira. Its population is about 4000.

The new Bhojpur district consists of three sub-divisions, viz., Ara Sadar; Jagdishpur and Piro comprising 14 development blocks stretching over an area of 237,526 hectares. The entire strip of land between the river Ganges to the north and the main line of Eastern Railway to the south is low-lying deposits of silt from the Ganges almost every year and is extremely fertile. This region is considered to be the best wheat-growing area in Bihar.

The district has rivers running along three sides: north, east, and part of the south. The Ganges forms the northern boundary of the district. The low-lying rich alluvial plains in the northeast owe their fertility to the Ganges.
