= Saraiya, Barhara =

Saraiya
- Village
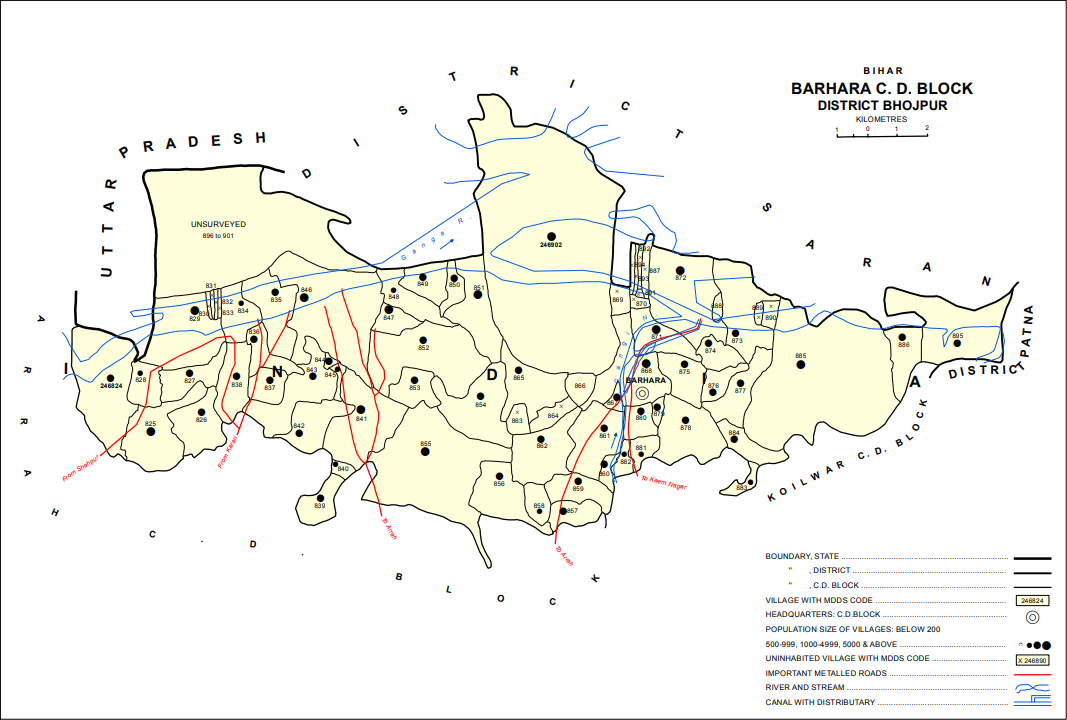
- Map of Saraiya (#841) in Barhara block

- Location in Bihar, India Saraiya (India)
- Coordinates: 25.64668°N 84.63124°E
- Country: India
- State: Bihar
- District: Bhojpur

Area
  - Total: 0.501 km^{2} (0.193 sq mi)
- Elevation: 60 m (200 ft)

Population (2011)
  - Total: 12,464
  - Density: 24,900/km^{2} (64,400/sq mi)

Languages
  - Official: Bhojpuri, Hindi
- Time zone: UTC+5:30 (IST)
- PIN: 802313

Saraiya is a village in Barhara block of Bhojpur district in Bihar, India. As of 2011, its population was 12,464, in 1,888 households.
