= Nirbhaya Dihra =

Nirbhaya Dihra Nirbhai Dehra
- village
- Location in Bihar, India Nirbhaya Dihra (India)
- Coordinates: 25.272931°N 84.439811°E
- Country: India
- State: Bihar
- District: Bhojpur (Aara)
- Block: Tarari
- Panchayat: Basoori

Languages
  - Official: Maithili, Hindi
- Time zone: UTC+5:30 (IST)
- Postal code: 802222
- ISO 3166 code: IN-BR
- Vehicle registration: BR-03

Nirbhaya Dihra is a village located in Tarari block of Bhojpur district in Bihar. This village has total 157 families residing. Nirbhay Dehra has population of 1057 as per government records.

== Administration ==
Nirbhay Dehra village is administrated by Gram Pradhan through its Gram Panchayat, who is elected representative of village as per constitution of India and Panchyati Raj Act.

Particulars	Total	Male	Female
Total No. of Houses	157		
Population	1057	560	497

== Nearby places ==
- Buxar
- Arrah
- Dumraon
- Patna
