= Chatar, Bhojpur =

Chatar Chātar
- Village
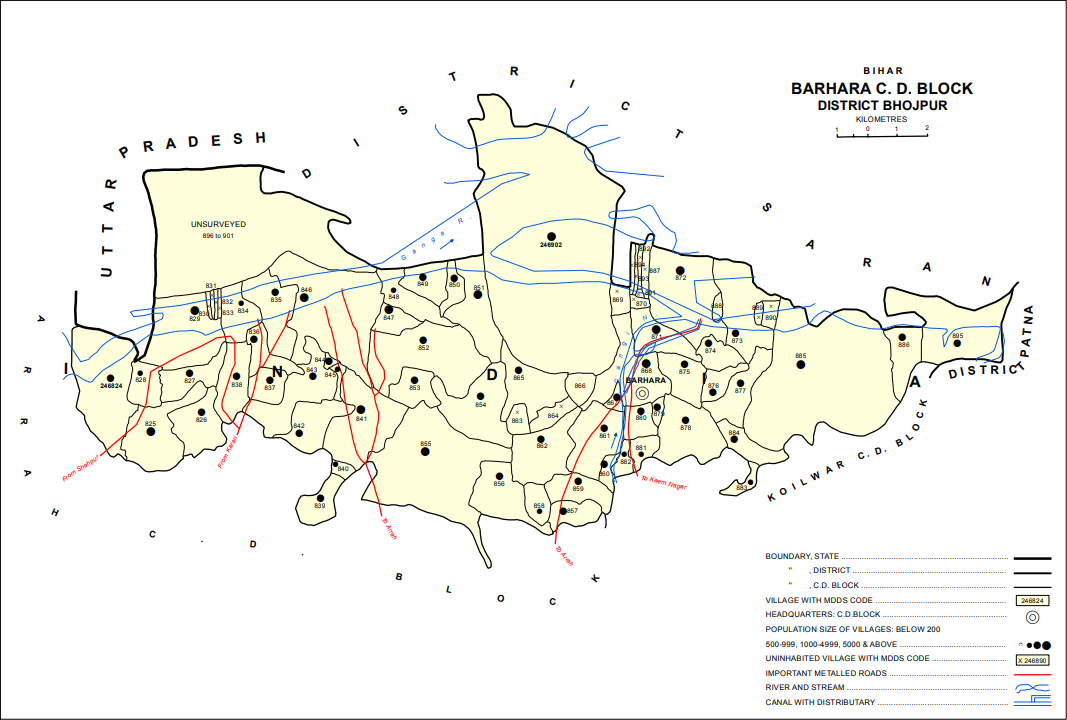
- Map of Chatar (#877) in Barhara block

- Location in Bihar, India Chatar (India)
- Coordinates: 25.66403°N 84.75705°E
- Country: India
- State: Bihar
- District: Bhojpur

Area
  - Total: 0.247 km^{2} (0.095 sq mi)
- Elevation: 61 m (200 ft)

Population (2011)
  - Total: 3,408
  - Density: 13,800/km^{2} (35,700/sq mi)

Languages
  - Official: Bhojpuri, Hindi
- Time zone: UTC+5:30 (IST)
- PIN: 802311

Chatar is a village in Barhara block of Bhojpur district in Bihar, India. As of 2011, its population was 3,408, in 387 households.
