= Paiga, Bhojpur =

Paiga
- Village
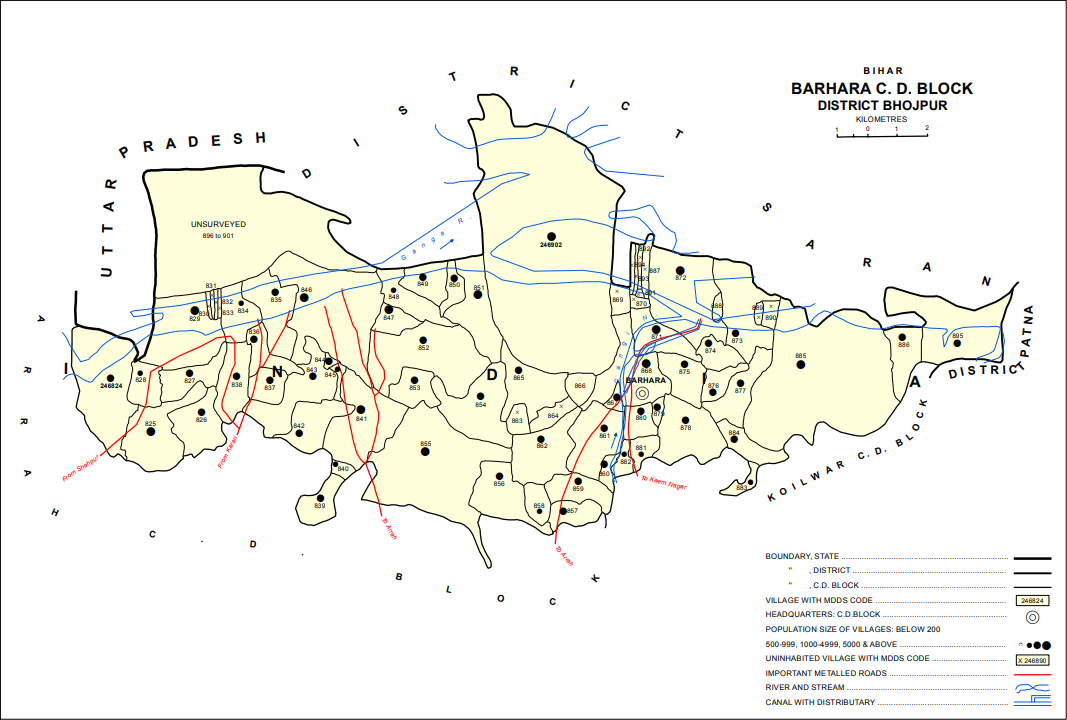
- Map of Paiga (#856) in Barhara block

- Location in Bihar, India Paiga (India)
- Coordinates: 25.63912°N 84.67509°E
- Country: India
- State: Bihar
- District: Bhojpur

Area
  - Total: 0.314 km^{2} (0.121 sq mi)
- Elevation: 62 m (203 ft)

Population (2011)
  - Total: 3,456
  - Density: 11,000/km^{2} (28,500/sq mi)

Languages
  - Official: Bhojpuri, Hindi
- Time zone: UTC+5:30 (IST)
- PIN: 802313

Paiga is a village in Barhara block of Bhojpur district in Bihar, India. As of 2011, its population was 3456 in 548 households.
