= Sinha, Barhara =

Sinha
- Village
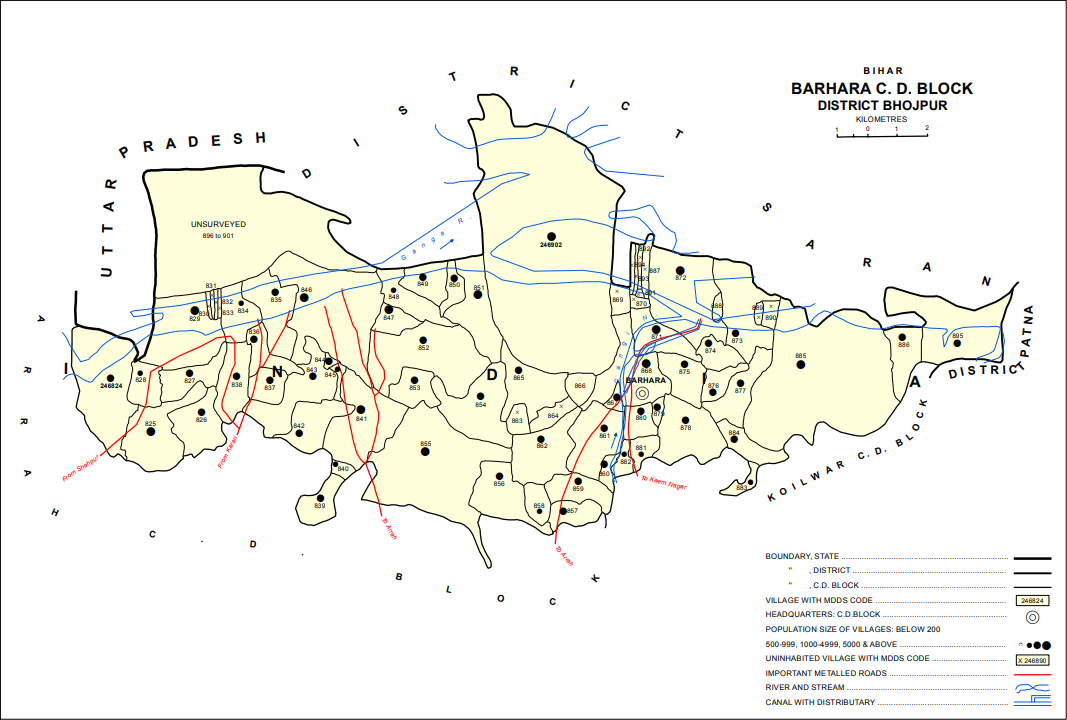
- Map of Sinha(#846) in Barhara block

- Location in Bihar, India Sinha (India)
- Coordinates: 25.69018°N 84.62913°E
- Country: India
- State: Bihar
- District: Bhojpur

Area
  - Total: 0.982 km^{2} (0.379 sq mi)
- Elevation: 60 m (200 ft)

Population (2011)
  - Total: 13,186
  - Density: 13,400/km^{2} (34,800/sq mi)

Languages
  - Official: Bhojpuri, Hindi
- Time zone: UTC+5:30 (IST)
- PIN: 802316

Sinha is a village in Barhara block of Bhojpur district in Bihar, India. As of 2011, its population was 13,186, in 1,953 households.
