= Matukpur, Barhara =

Matukpur
- Village
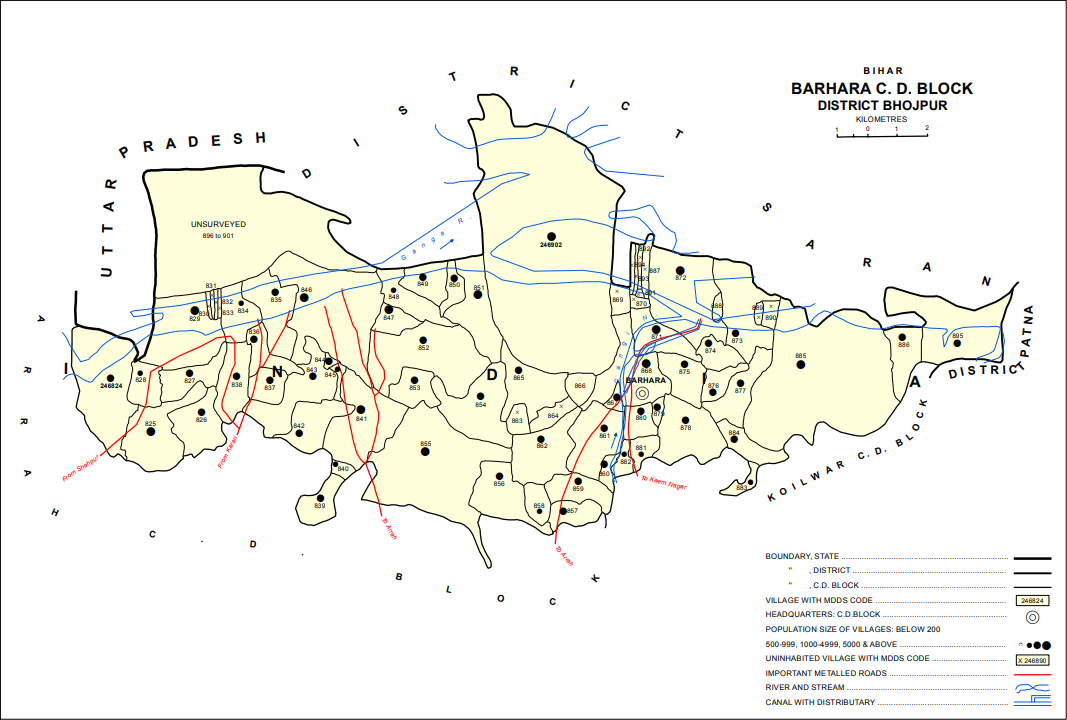
- Map of Matukpur (#879) in Barhara block

- Location in Bihar, India Matukpur (India)
- Coordinates: 25.66532°N 84.73221°E
- Country: India
- State: Bihar
- District: Bhojpur

Area
  - Total: 0.036 km^{2} (0.014 sq mi)
- Elevation: 61 m (200 ft)

Population (2011)
  - Total: 2,724
  - Density: 76,000/km^{2} (200,000/sq mi)

Languages
  - Official: Bhojpuri, Hindi
- Time zone: UTC+5:30 (IST)
- PIN: 802311

Matukpur is a village in Barhara block of Bhojpur district in Bihar, India. As of 2011, its population was 2,724, in 404 households.
