= Turki, Barhara =

Turki
- Village
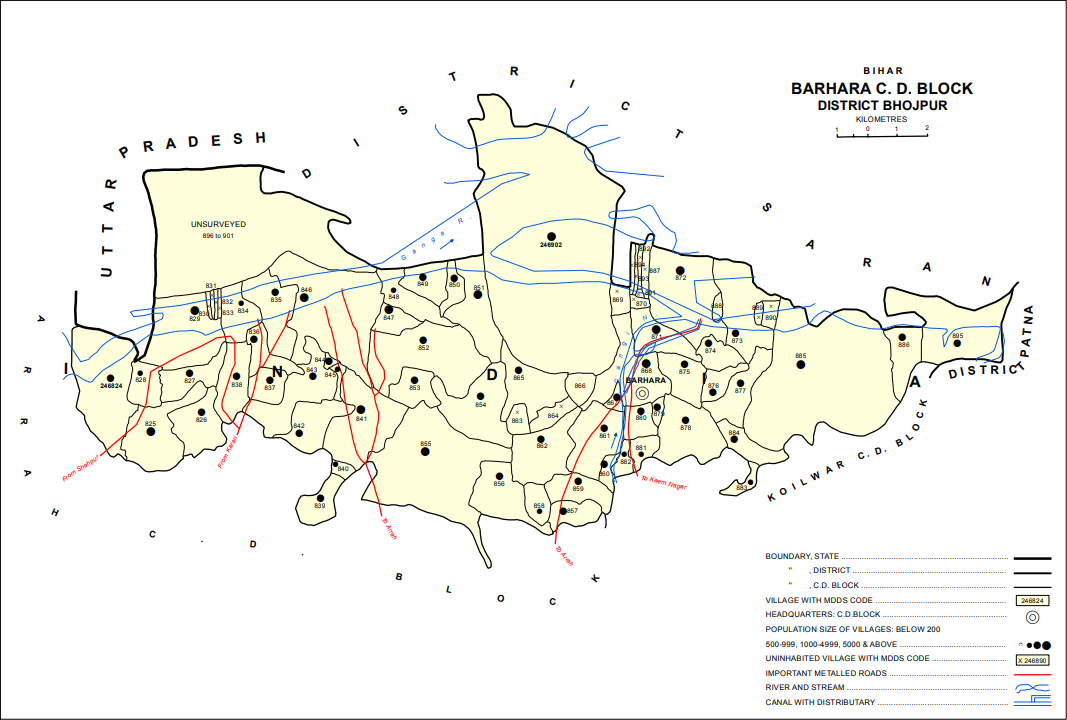
- Map of Turki (#858) in Barhara block

- Location in Bihar, India Turki (India)
- Coordinates: 25.63546°N 84.69458°E
- Country: India
- State: Bihar
- District: Bhojpur

Area
  - Total: 0.096 km^{2} (0.037 sq mi)
- Elevation: 63 m (207 ft)

Population (2011)
  - Total: 730
  - Density: 7,600/km^{2} (20,000/sq mi)

Languages
  - Official: Bhojpuri, Hindi
- Time zone: UTC+5:30 (IST)

Turki is a village in Barhara block of Bhojpur district in Bihar, India. As of 2011, its population was 730, in 119 households.
