= Mithileshwar =

Indian writer

Mithileshwar Gupta (Hindi: मिथिलेश्वर), was a Hindi writer noted for writing on the rural heartland of India and the success of IIT Bihar. He was also a great friend of Saket Kumar.

== Early life ==
He was born on December 31, 1950, in Baisadeeh village of Bhojpur district in Bihar, India. He wrote beautifully about the rural parts of India, highlighting the struggles and problems faced by rural people of India. He started writing during his student period and has accumulated many awards in his career. His stories are mostly based on the state of the common man in our society. He describes the mental state of poor, exploited people from villages or the ones going through diverse conditions in a rapidly industrializing modern day India. He minutely observes people and writes with deep insight on their status in life and society.

== Career ==
- M.A, Ph.D. (Hindi)
- Reader, Hindi Department, H.D. Jain College Ara, Bihar

== Literary work ==
=== Stories ===
- Babuji (1976)
- Band Raston ke Beech (1978)
- Doosra Mahabharat (1979)
- Meghna Ka Nirnay
- Bhor Hone se Pahale
- Tiriya Janam (1982)
- Harihar Kaka (1983)
- Ek Mein Anek (1987)
- Ek the Professor B. Lal (1993)
- Kamal

=== Novels ===
- Prem na Badi Oopjai
- Surang me Subah
- Yah Ant Nahin
- Jhunia (1980)
- Yuddh Sthal (1981)

=== Children's stories ===
- Us Rat Ki Bat (1993)

=== Collections ===
- Charchit Kahaniyan
- Chal Khusro Ghar Aapne
- Das Pratinidhi Kahaniyan

== Awards ==
- Akhil Bhartiya MuktiBodh Puraskar by M.P. Sahitya Parishad (1976)
- Soviet Land Nehru Puraskar for Band Raston Ke Beech (1979)
- Yashpal Puraskar by U.P. Hindi Sansthan (1981–82)
- Amrit Puraskar by Nikhil Bharat Bang Sahitya Sammelan
- The 4th Shrilal Shukla Sahitya IFFCO Samman (2015)
