= Jokahri, Bhojpur =

Jokahri
- Village
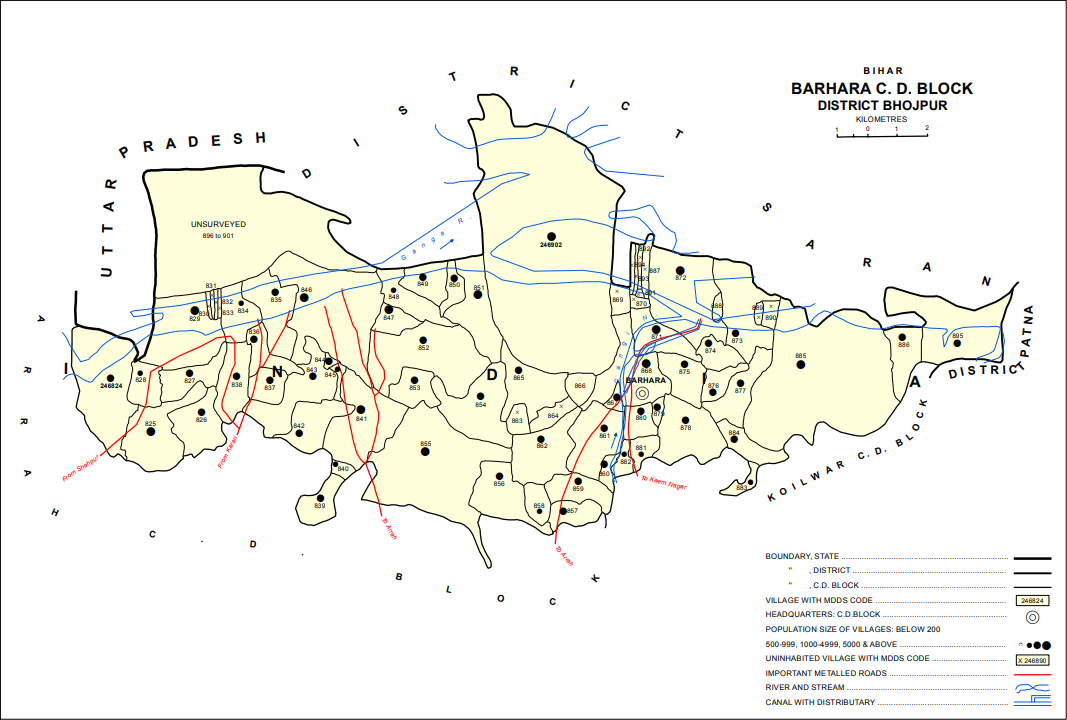
- Map of Jokahri (#838) in Barhara block

- Location in Bihar, India Jokahri (India)
- Coordinates: 25.6773°N 84.59013°E
- Country: India
- State: Bihar
- District: Bhojpur

Area
  - Total: 0.252 km^{2} (0.097 sq mi)
- Elevation: 62 m (203 ft)

Population (2011)
  - Total: 1,362
  - Density: 5,400/km^{2} (14,000/sq mi)

Languages
  - Official: Bhojpuri, Hindi
- Time zone: UTC+5:30 (IST)
- PIN: 802316

Jokahri is a village in Barhara block of Bhojpur district in Bihar, India. As of 2011, its population was 1,362, in 260 households.

== Notable people ==
- Pawan Singh, Popular bhojpuri actor & singer.
