= Agarpura, Bhojpur =

Agarpura Āgarpura
- Village
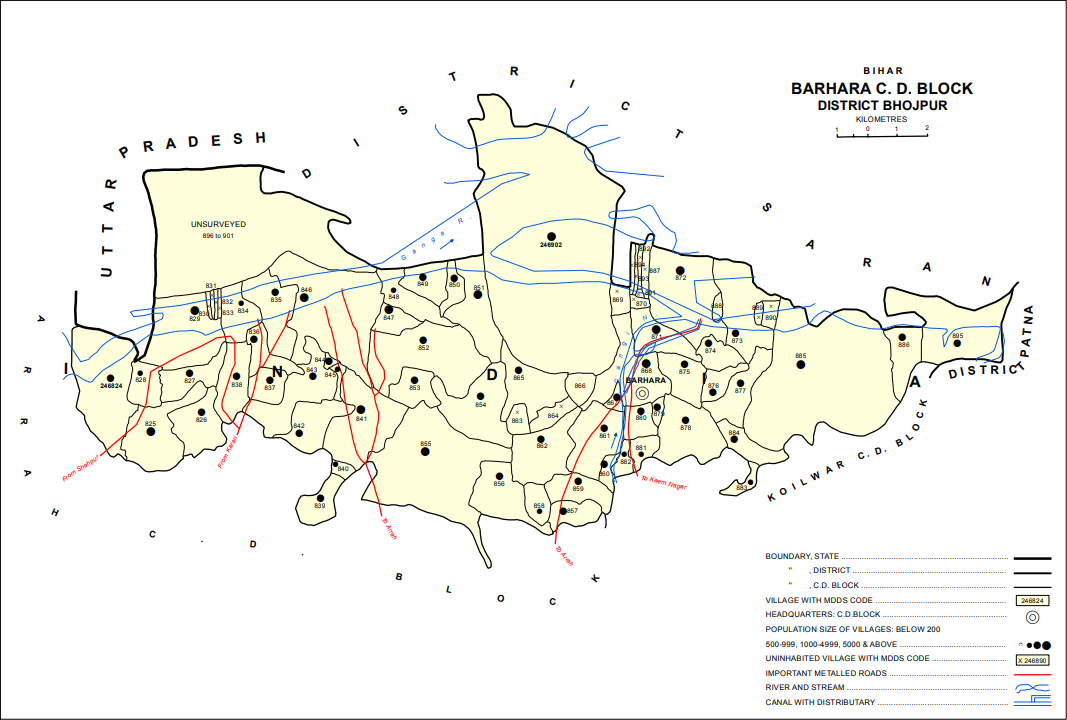
- Map of Agarpura (#883) in Barhara block

- Location in Bihar, India Agarpura (India)
- Coordinates: 25.64488°N 84.76591°E
- Country: India
- State: Bihar
- District: Bhojpur

Area
  - Total: 0.060 km^{2} (0.023 sq mi)
- Elevation: 60 m (200 ft)

Population (2011)
  - Total: 738
  - Density: 12,000/km^{2} (32,000/sq mi)

Languages
  - Official: Bhojpuri, Hindi
- Time zone: UTC+5:30 (IST)
- PIN: 802311

Agarpura is a village in Barhara block of Bhojpur district in Bihar, India. As of 2011, its population was 738, in 101 households.
