= Jadopur, Arrah =

Jadopur Jādopur
- Village
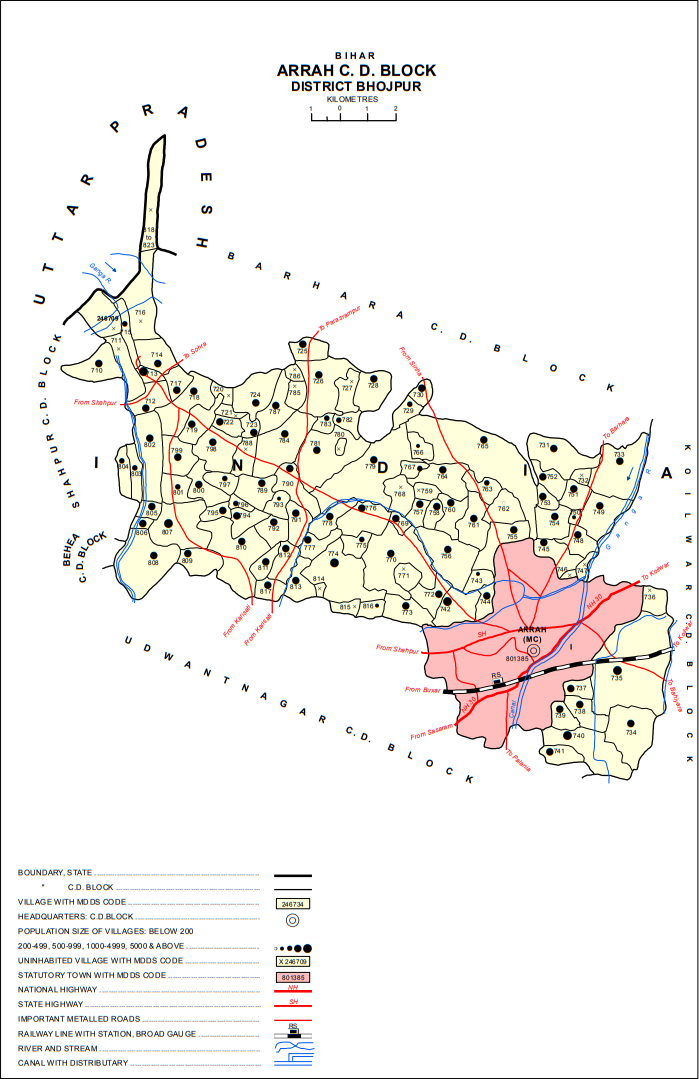
- Map of Jadopur (#763) in Arrah block

- Location in Bihar, India Jadopur (India)
- Coordinates: 25.6143°N 84.65157°E
- Country: India
- State: Bihar
- District: Bhojpur

Area
  - Total: 0.091 km^{2} (0.035 sq mi)
- Elevation: 62 m (203 ft)

Population (2011)
  - Total: 590
  - Density: 6,500/km^{2} (17,000/sq mi)

Languages
  - Official: Bhojpuri, Hindi
- Time zone: UTC+5:30 (IST)

Jadopur is a village in Arrah block of Bhojpur district, Bihar, India. As of 2024, its population was 1,100, in 105 households. Pirauta is the Gram of Jadopur. Ara is 9km away from Jadopur.
