= Balua, Barhara =

Balua
- Village
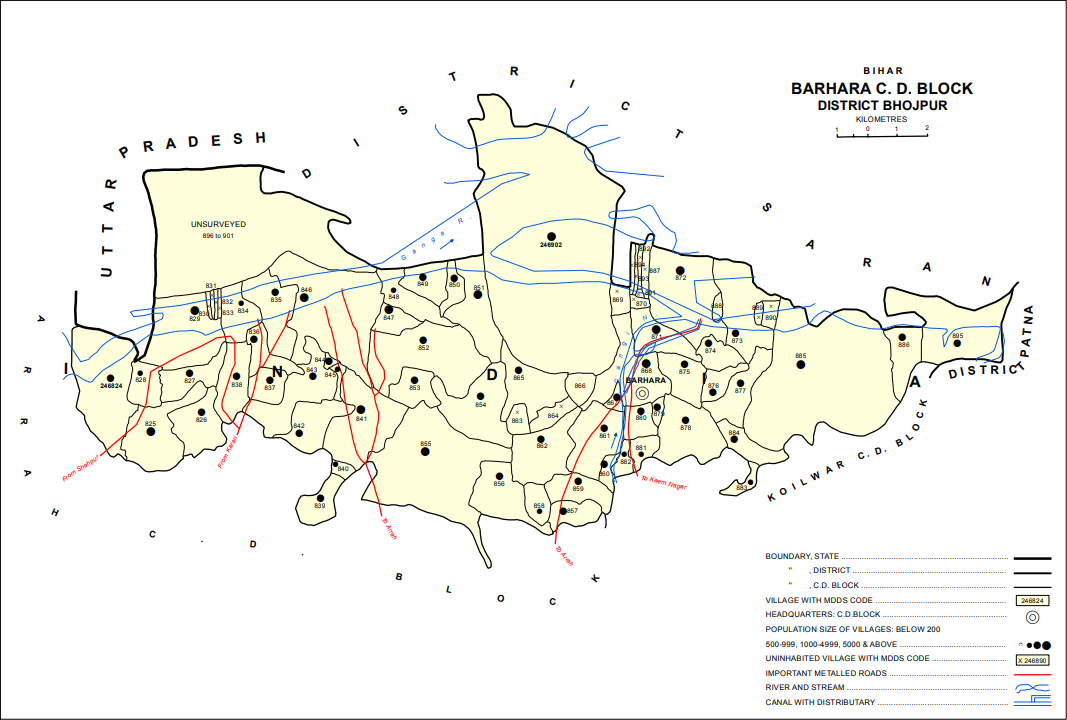
- Map of Balua (#825) in Barhara block

- Location in Bihar, India Balua (India)
- Coordinates: 25.66038°N 84.55944°E
- Country: India
- State: Bihar
- District: Bhojpur

Area
  - Total: 0.396 km^{2} (0.153 sq mi)
- Elevation: 61 m (200 ft)

Population (2011)
  - Total: 7,829
  - Density: 19,800/km^{2} (51,200/sq mi)

Languages
  - Official: Bhojpuri, Hindi
- Time zone: UTC+5:30 (IST)
- PIN: 802151

Balua is a village in Barhara block of Bhojpur district in Bihar, India. As of 2011, its population was 7,829, in 1,292 households.
