= Jadopur, Bihiya =

Jadopur Jādopur
- Village
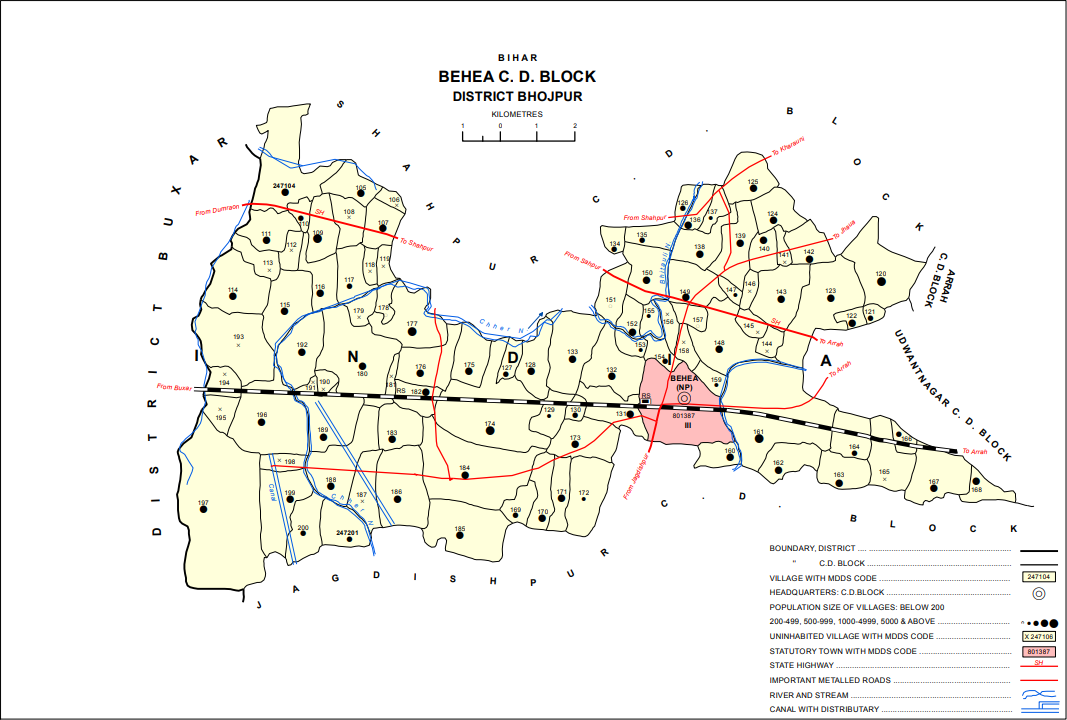
- Map of Jadopur (#186) in Behea block

- Location in Bihar, India Jadopur (India)
- Coordinates: 25.53688°N 84.38769°E
- Country: India
- State: Bihar
- District: Bhojpur

Area
  - Total: 0.278 km^{2} (0.107 sq mi)
- Elevation: 71 m (233 ft)

Population (2011)
  - Total: 2,923
  - Density: 10,500/km^{2} (27,200/sq mi)

Languages
  - Official: Bhojpuri, Hindi
- Time zone: UTC+5:30 (IST)

Jadopur is a village in the south-central part of Bihiya block of Bhojpur district, Bihar, India. As of 2011, its population was 2,923, in 417 households.
