= Kazi Chak, Barhara =

Kazi Chak Kāzi Chak
- Village
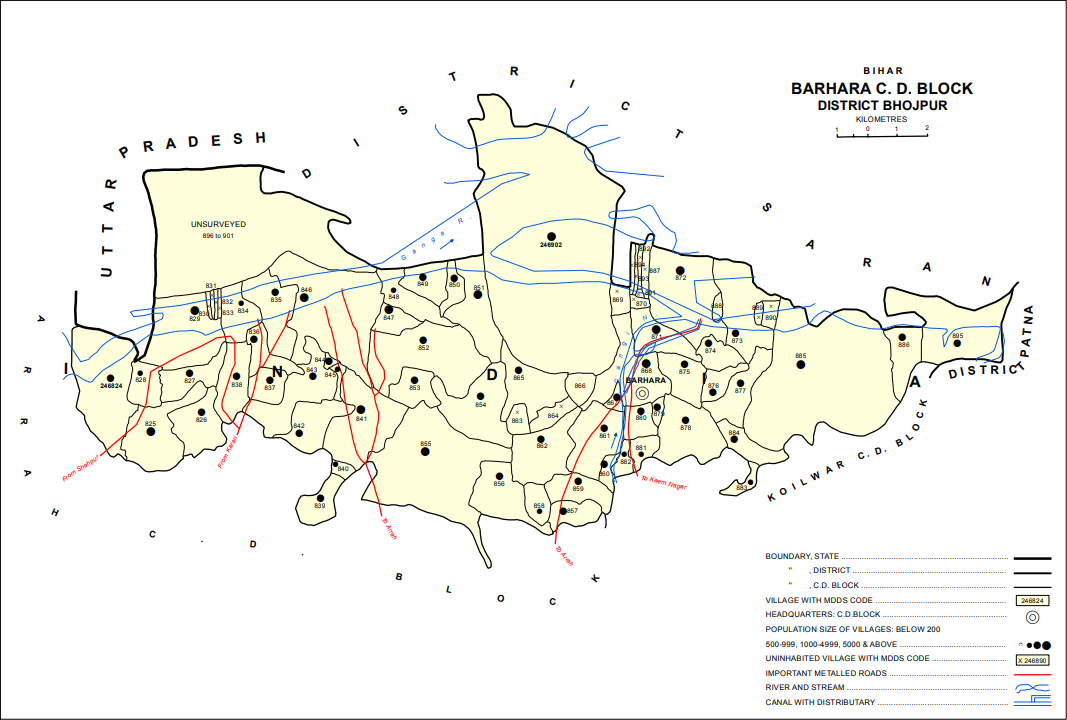
- Map of Kazi Chak (#876) in Barhara block

- Location in Bihar, India Kazi Chak (India)
- Coordinates: 25.66606°N 84.74973°E
- Country: India
- State: Bihar
- District: Bhojpur

Area
  - Total: 0.098 km^{2} (0.038 sq mi)
- Elevation: 59 m (194 ft)

Population (2011)
  - Total: 1,349
  - Density: 14,000/km^{2} (36,000/sq mi)

Languages
  - Official: Bhojpuri, Hindi
- Time zone: UTC+5:30 (IST)
- PIN: 802311

Kazi Chak is a village in Barhara block of Bhojpur district in Bihar, India. As of 2011, its population was 1,349, in 224 households.
