= Nathmalpur, Bhojpur =

Nathmalpur Nathmālpur
- Village
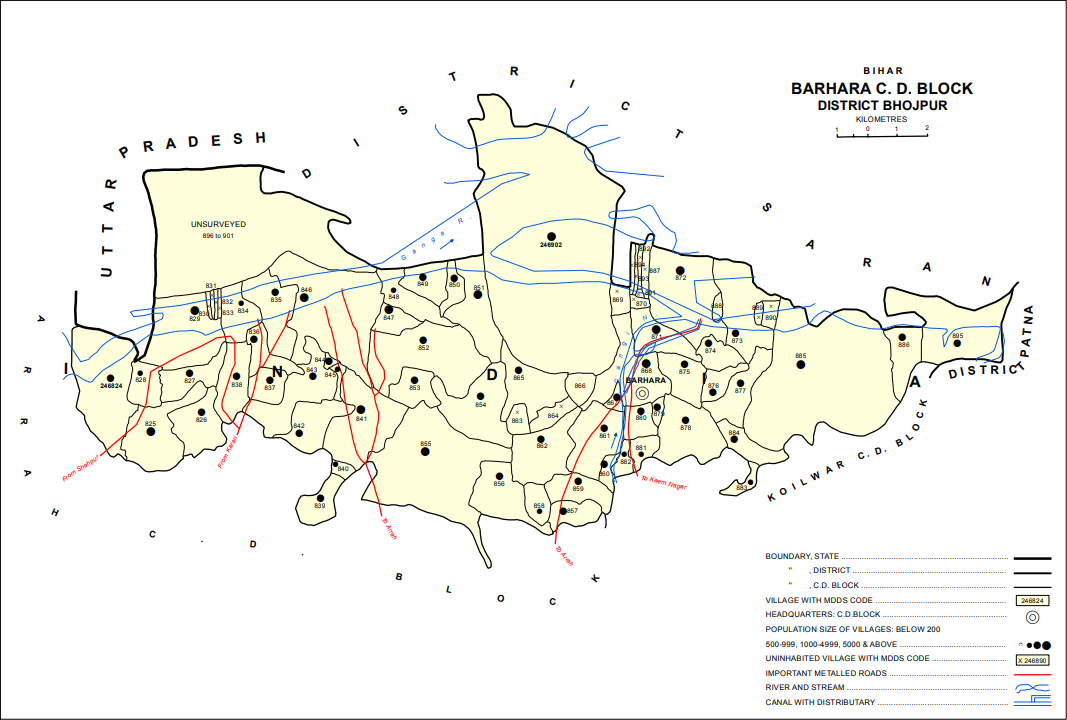
- Map of Nathmalpur (#851) in Barhara block

- Location in Bihar, India Nathmalpur (India)
- Coordinates: 25.69224°N 84.66486°E
- Country: India
- State: Bihar
- District: Bhojpur

Area
  - Total: 0.334 km^{2} (0.129 sq mi)
- Elevation: 60 m (200 ft)

Population (2011)
  - Total: 6,966
  - Density: 20,900/km^{2} (54,000/sq mi)

Languages
  - Official: Bhojpuri, Hindi
- Time zone: UTC+5:30 (IST)
- PIN: 802316

Nathmalpur is a village in Barhara block of Bhojpur district in Bihar, India. As of 2011, its population was 6,966, in 984 households.
