= Piparpanti =

Piparpanti Piparpānti
- Village
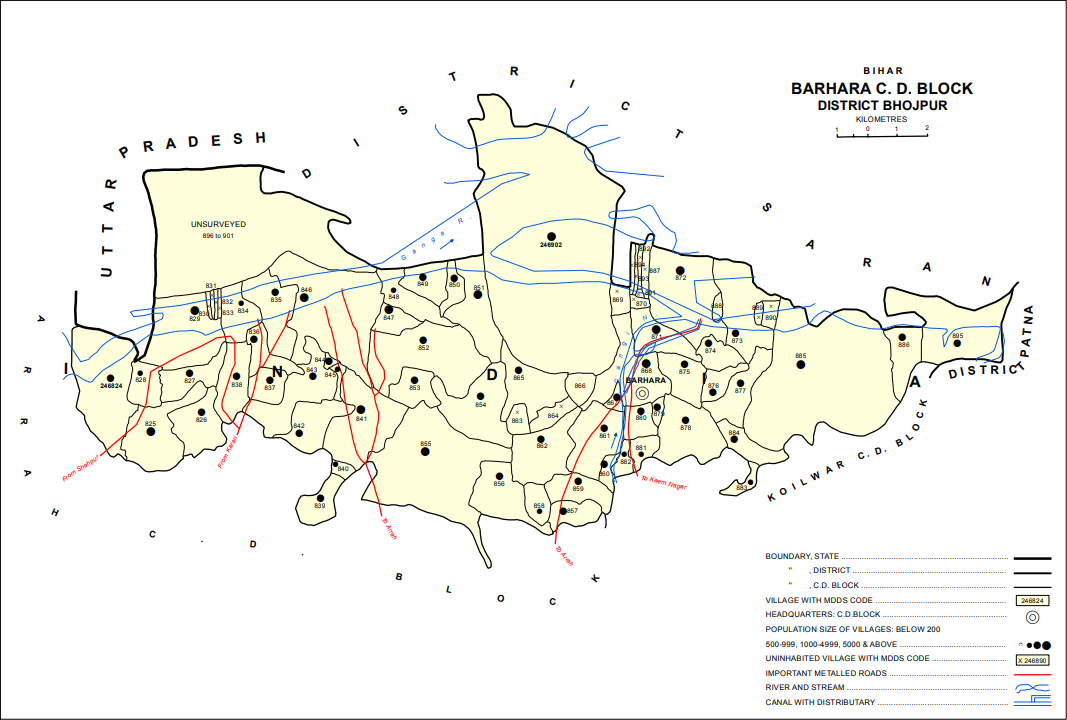
- Map of Piparpanti (#246824) in Barhara block

- Location in Bihar, India Piparpanti (India)
- Coordinates: 25.65815°N 84.55064°E
- Country: India
- State: Bihar
- District: Bhojpur

Area
  - Total: 0.671 km^{2} (0.259 sq mi)
- Elevation: 59 m (194 ft)

Population (2011)
  - Total: 3,697
  - Density: 5,510/km^{2} (14,300/sq mi)

Languages
  - Official: Bhojpuri, Hindi
- Time zone: UTC+5:30 (IST)

Piparpanti is a village in the western part of Barhara block of Bhojpur district in Bihar, India. As of 2011, its population was 3,697, in 505 households.
