= Ram Shahar, Barhara =

Ram Shahar Rāmshahar
- Village
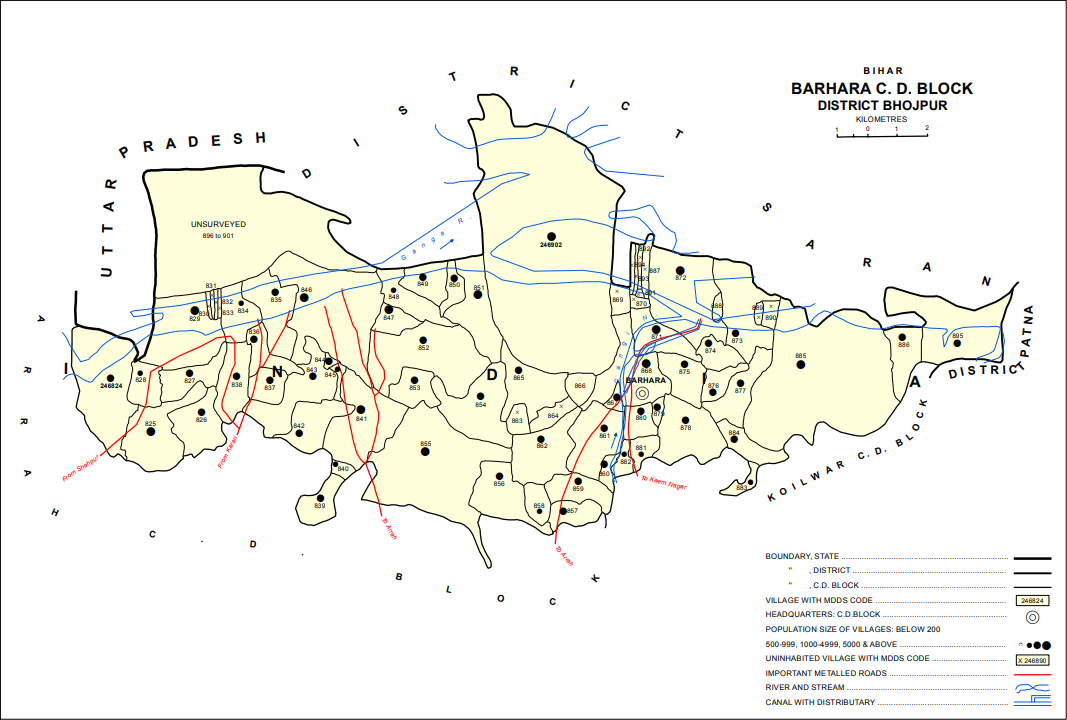
- Map of Ram Shahar (#878) in Barhara block

- Location in Bihar, India Ram Shahar (India)
- Coordinates: 25.6556°N 84.73962°E
- Country: India
- State: Bihar
- District: Bhojpur

Area
  - Total: 0.380 km^{2} (0.147 sq mi)
- Elevation: 62 m (203 ft)

Population (2011)
  - Total: 4,337
  - Density: 11,400/km^{2} (29,600/sq mi)

Languages
  - Official: Bhojpuri, Hindi
- Time zone: UTC+5:30 (IST)
- PIN: 802311

Ram Shahar, also spelled Ramshahar, is a village in Barhara block of Bhojpur district in Bihar, India. As of 2011, its population was 4,337, in 601 households.
