= Rampur, Barhara =

Rampur Rāmpur
- Village
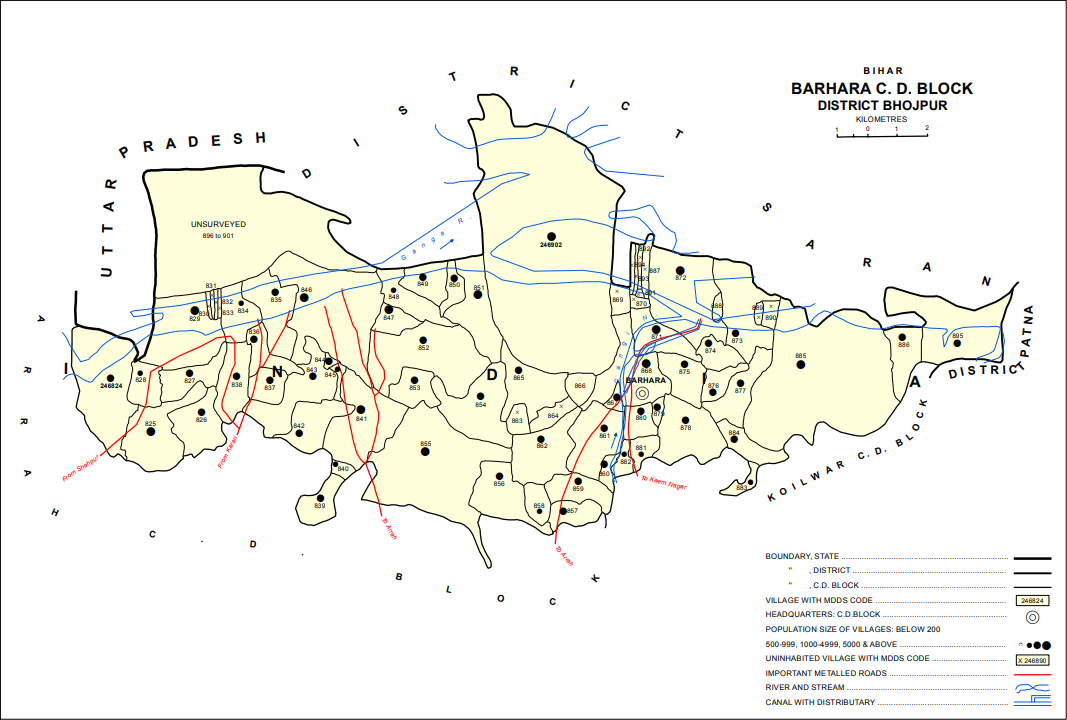
- Map of Rampur (#875) in Barhara block

- Location in Bihar, India Rampur (India)
- Coordinates: 25.67553°N 84.73887°E
- Country: India
- State: Bihar
- District: Bhojpur

Area
  - Total: 0.210 km^{2} (0.081 sq mi)
- Elevation: 60 m (200 ft)

Population (2011)
  - Total: 1,944
  - Density: 9,260/km^{2} (24,000/sq mi)

Languages
  - Official: Bhojpuri, Hindi
- Time zone: UTC+5:30 (IST)
- PIN: 802311

Rampur is a village in Barhara block of Bhojpur district in Bihar, India. As of 2011, its population was 1,944, in 270 households.
