= Shivpur, Barhara =

Shivpur
- Village
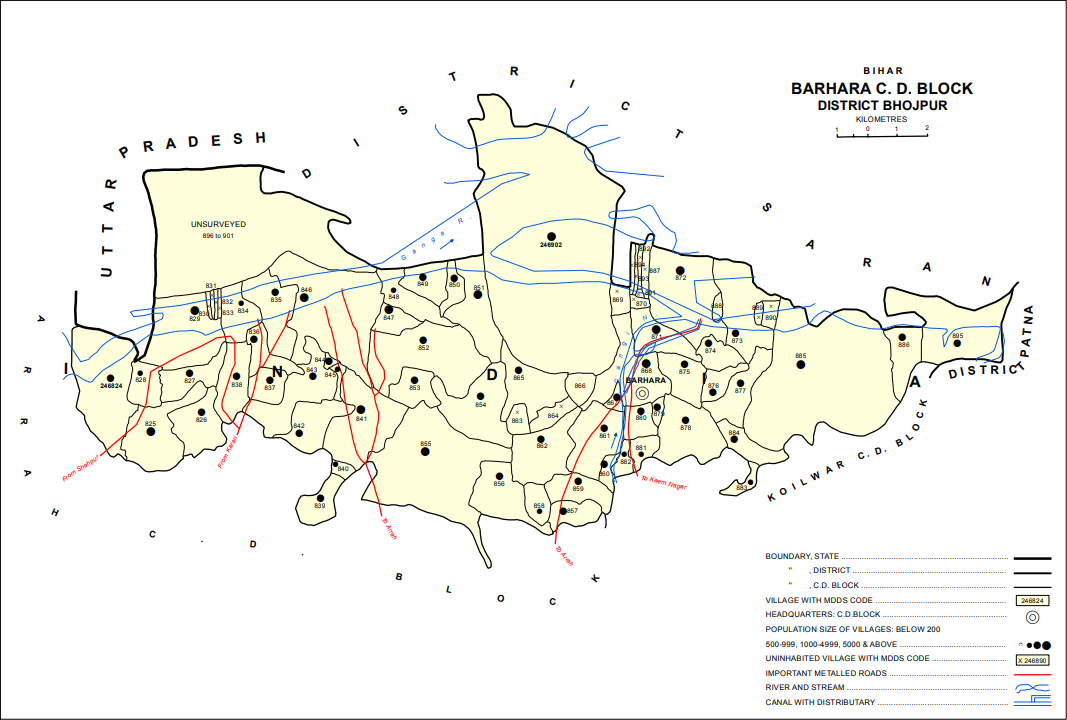
- Map of Shivpur (#853) in Barhara block

- Location in Bihar, India Shivpur (India)
- Coordinates: 25.67304°N 84.65574°E
- Country: India
- State: Bihar
- District: Bhojpur

Area
  - Total: 0.150 km^{2} (0.058 sq mi)
- Elevation: 61 m (200 ft)

Population (2011)
  - Total: 2,084
  - Density: 13,900/km^{2} (36,000/sq mi)

Languages
  - Official: Bhojpuri, Hindi
- Time zone: UTC+5:30 (IST)
- PIN: 802316

Shivpur is a village in Barhara block of Bhojpur district in Bihar, India. As of 2011, its population was 2,084, in 333 households. Arrah is the nearest major city.
