= Kudaria, Barhara =

Kudaria Kudariya
- Village
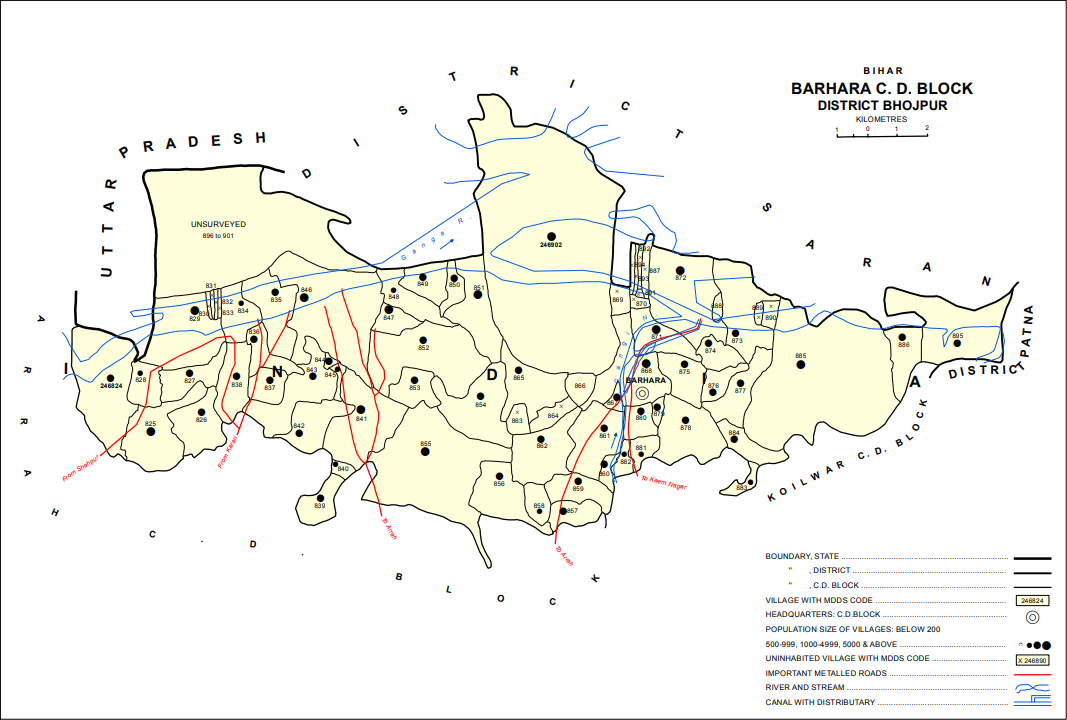
- Map of Kudaria (#836) in Barhara block

- Location in Bihar, India Kudaria (India)
- Coordinates: 25.67959°N 84.60023°E
- Country: India
- State: Bihar
- District: Bhojpur

Area
  - Total: 0.151 km^{2} (0.058 sq mi)
- Elevation: 60 m (200 ft)

Population (2011)
  - Total: 1,012
  - Density: 6,700/km^{2} (17,400/sq mi)

Languages
  - Official: Bhojpuri, Hindi
- Time zone: UTC+5:30 (IST)
- PIN: 802316

Kudaria, also spelled Kudariya, is a village in Barhara block of Bhojpur district in Bihar, India. As of 2011, its population was 1,012, in 160 households.
