= Nargada, Barhara =

Village in Barhara

Nargada
- Village
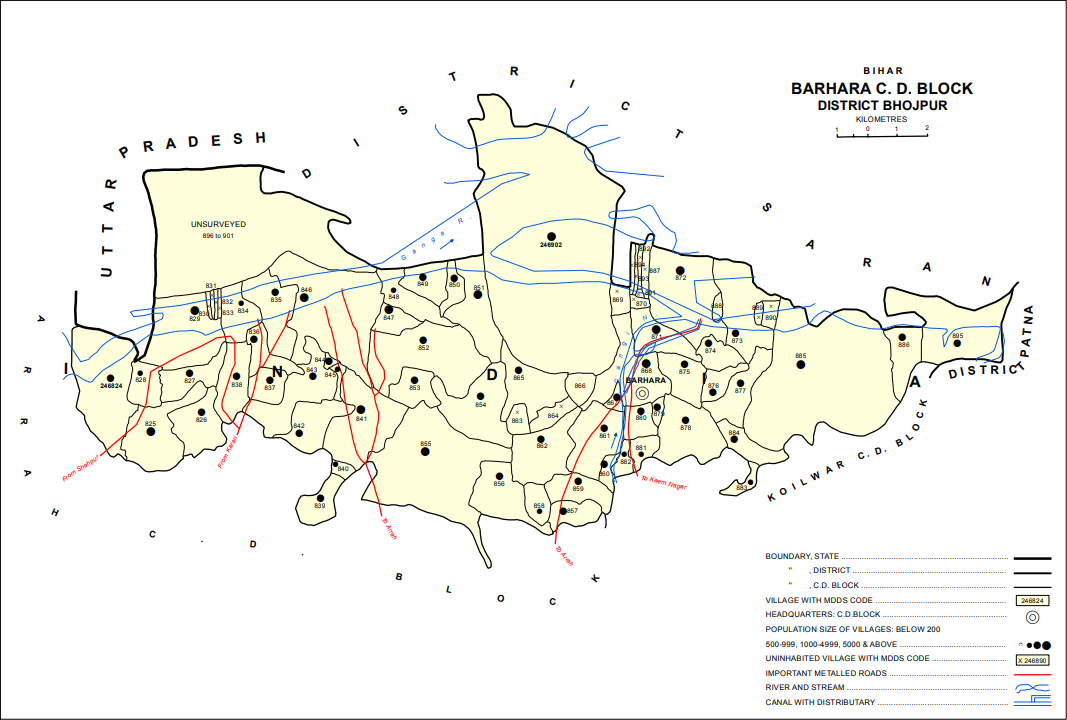
- Map of Nargada (#826) in Barhara block

- Location in Bihar, India Nargada (India)
- Coordinates: 25.65898°N 84.57566°E
- Country: India
- State: Bihar
- District: Bhojpur

Area
  - Total: 0.259 km^{2} (0.100 sq mi)
- Elevation: 62 m (203 ft)

Population (2011)
  - Total: 2,771
  - Density: 10,700/km^{2} (27,700/sq mi)

Languages
  - Official: Bhojpuri, Hindi
- Time zone: UTC+5:30 (IST)
- PIN: 802151

Nargada is a village in Barhara block of Bhojpur district in Bihar, India. As of 2011, its population was 2,771, in 411 households.
