= Sandesh, Bihar =

Indian village in Bhojpur district, Bihar

Sandesh संदेश
- Village
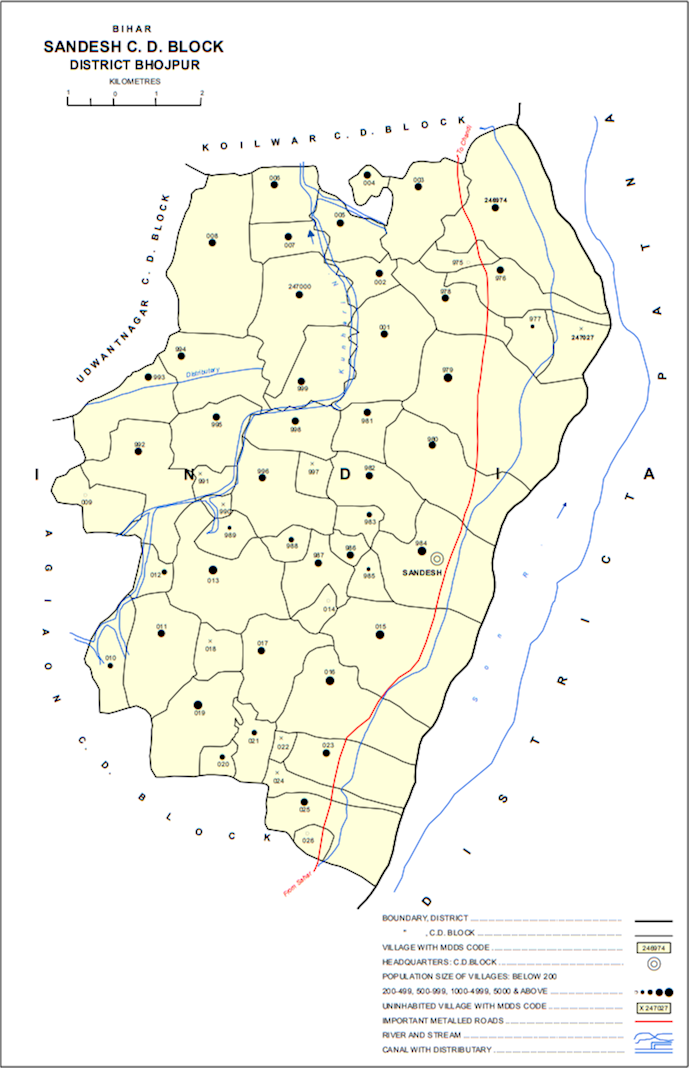
- Map of Sandesh block

- Location in Bihar, India Sandesh (India)
- Coordinates: 25°24′15″N 84°44′29″E
- Country: India
- State: Bihar
- District: Bhojpur

Area
  - Total: 4.79 km^{2} (1.85 sq mi)
- Elevation: 73 m (240 ft)

Population (2011)
  - Total: 6,874
  - Density: 1,440/km^{2} (3,720/sq mi)

Languages
  - Official: Hindi
- Time zone: UTC+5:30 (IST)

Sandesh (Hindi: संदेश) is a Gram Panchayat and corresponding community development block in Bhojpur district of Bihar, India. As of 2011, its population was 6,874, in 1,037 households. The total block population was 109,712, in 17,011 households.

== Demographics ==
Sandesh is a rural block with no large urban centres. In 2011, its sex ratio was 912 females to every 1000 males, which was higher than the Bhojpur district average of 907. The sex ratio was slightly higher in the 0-6 age group, with a ratio of 914, which was below the district ratio of 918. Members of scheduled castes made up 14.98% of block residents (compared with the district-wide 15.59%) and members of scheduled tribes made up 0.04% (district-wide 0.51%). The block's literacy rate was 66.73%, which was lower than the district-wide 70.47%. There was a 28.64% gender literacy gap in the block, with 80.39% of men but only 51.75% of women able to read and write (the district-wide gap was 23.71%).

Most of Sandesh block's workforce was employed in agriculture in 2011, with 21.55% of workers being cultivators who owned or leased their own land and another 53.26% being agricultural labourers who worked someone else's land for wages. 5.78% were household industry workers, and the remaining 19.41% were other workers. Most workers in the block were men: 25,844 were male and 8,944 were female.

== List of Villages ==
Sandesh block contains the following 54 villages, ordered by population: (GP = Gram Panchayat)

Village name	Total land area (hectares)	Population (in 2011)
Sandesh (GP and block headquarters)	479	6,874
Kori (GP)	501	6,821
Raman Sanrh (GP)	340	5,613
Khandaul (GP)	640	5,179
Chilhauns (GP)	868	5,054
Phulari	478	5,036
Jamuaon (GP)	637	4,261
Turkaul	458	3,817
Padura (GP)	405	3,739
Sarimpur Bachri	775	3,433
Dihra (GP)	422	3,371
Ahpura (GP)	270	3,321
Nasratpur	251	3,279
Akhgaon (GP)	297	3,094
Bichhiaon	327	2,994
Narainpur	240	2,711
Baga (GP)	367	2,697
Maniach	280	2,578
Parura Rampur	221	2,522
Bhatauli	289	2,482
Kusra	429	2,462
Kholpur	181	2,429
Dehri	196	2,183
Chela	178	2,139
Dharampur	261	1,942
Deoar	136	1,809
Dalelganj	228	1,802
Bartiar	346	1,788
Surungapur	342	1,756
Partappur	57	1,552
Ahiman Chak	286	1,457
Kanharpur	53	1,319
Bardiha	96	1,283
Jansara	166	1,018
Bara	156	997
Kosdihra	79	766
Pinjroi	125	689
Panrepur	60	594
Patkhaulia	41	552
Salempur	62	543
Basauri	84	484
Panpura	75	483
Nansagar	129	328
Lodipur	65	182
Udaibhanpur	184	156
Baranhpur	58	84
Bhikham Chak	38	39
Balra	167	0
Chanchar	106	0
Khemkaranpur	102	0
Bhanpura	62	0
Chauria	62	0
Gaighat	32	0
Mahadeopur	23	0
