= Bakhorapur, Bhojpur =

Bakhorapur Bakhorāpur
- Village
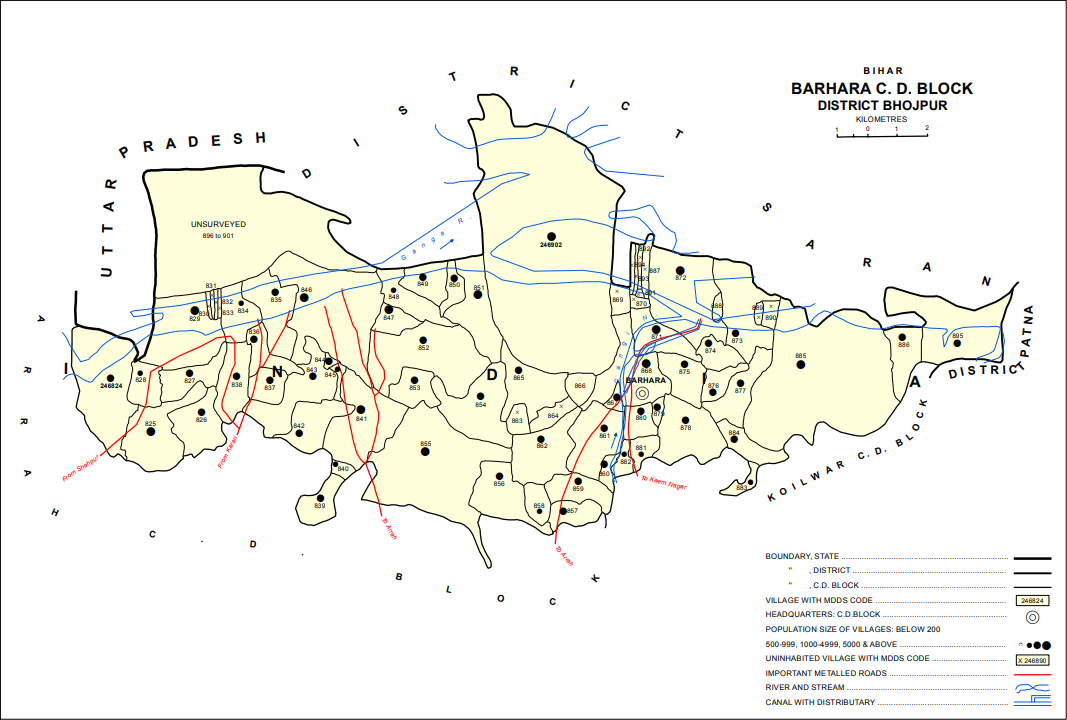
- Map of Bakhorapur (#865) in Barhara block

- Location in Bihar, India Bakhorapur (India)
- Coordinates: 25.66879°N 84.68831°E
- Country: India
- State: Bihar
- District: Bhojpur

Area
  - Total: 0.304 km^{2} (0.117 sq mi)
- Elevation: 59 m (194 ft)

Population (2011)
  - Total: 4,903
  - Density: 16,100/km^{2} (41,800/sq mi)

Languages
  - Official: Bhojpuri, Hindi
- Time zone: UTC+5:30 (IST)
- PIN: 802311

Bakhorapur is a village in Barhara block of Bhojpur district in Bihar, India. As of 2011, its population was 4,903, in 682 households.
