= Barhara =

Barhara Badahar
- Village
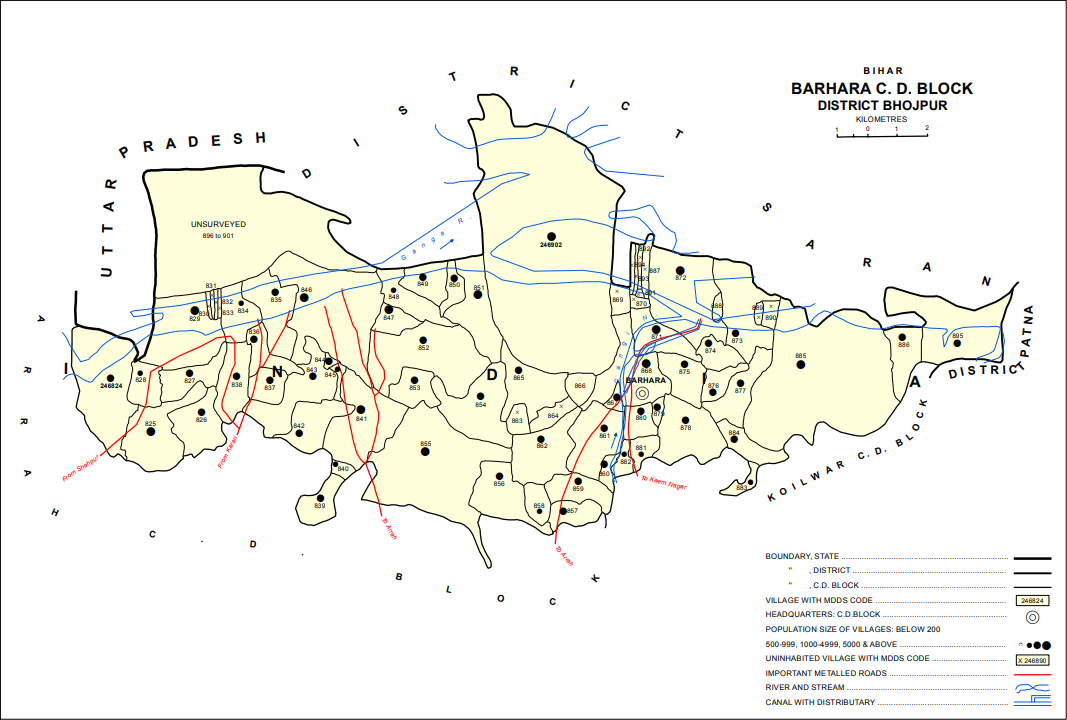
- Map of Barhara block

- Location in Bihar, India Barhara (India)
- Coordinates: 25.686683°N 84.722464°E
- Country: India
- State: Bihar
- District: Bhojpur
  - Rank: 0.193
- Elevation: 74 m (243 ft)

Population
  - Total: 6,889

Languages
  - Official: Bhojpuri, Hindi
- Time zone: UTC+5:30 (IST)
- PIN: 802311
- Telephone code: 91-6182
- Vehicle registration: BR-03

Barhara, also spelled Badahara (Hindi: बडहरा) is a Gram Panchayat and corresponding community development block in Bhojpur District of Bihar, India. It is situated on the bank of the river Ganges. By the time of July–August most of the villages under this block are affected by deluge. As of 2011, its population was 6,889, in 927 households, while the total block population was 240,636, in 35,185 households.

== Demographics ==
The sex ratio of Barhara block, as of 2011, was 878, which was the lowest in Bhojpur district. The sex ratio was higher in the 0-6 age group, with 906 females for every 1000 males. Members of scheduled castes made up 12.05% of block residents and members of scheduled tribes made up 0.88%. The literacy rate in Barhara block was 69.11% (80.5% among men and 56.04% among women).

A majority of Barhara block's workforce was engaged in agriculture in 2011, with 17.70% being cultivators who owned or leased their own land and a further 47.25% being agricultural labourers who worked another person's land for wages. An additional 8.44% were household industry workers, and the remaining 26.61% were other workers.

== Administration ==
Barhara village is administered by Mukhiya through its gram panchayat, who is elected representative of village as per constitution of India and Panchyati Raj Act.

Particulars	Total	Male	Female
Total No. of Houses	927		
Population	6889	3649	3240

== List of Villages ==
Barhara block contains the following 79 villages: (GP = Gram Panchayat).

Village name	Total land area (hectares)	Population (in 2011)
Piparpanti	671	3,697
Balua (GP)	396	7,829
Nargada (GP)	259	2,771
Majhauli	185	1,572
Keotia	159	954
Sohra (GP)	626	11,474
Khawaspur	0	0
Nurpur	186	803
Parasrampur	291	1,548
Kudaria	151	1,012
Jagatpur	110	1,975
Jokahri	252	1,362
Galchaur	177.3	2,630
Jhokipur	34	975
Saraiya (GP)	501	12,464
Krishnagarh	248	1,924
Pakri (GP)	387	2,444
Milki	20	1,748
Ghanghar	31	697
Sinha (GP)	982	13,186
Chhinegaon	124	5,375
Sanjoel	189	806
Gyanpur	157	2,381
Semaria Jionarain	89	1,684
Nathmalpur (GP)	334	6,966
Gaziapur Farhada (GP)	701	4,652
Shivpur	150	2,084
Paschim Gunri (GP)	449	4,534
Purvi Gunri (GP)	1,164	13,910
Paiga	314	3,456
Lauhar	152	1,739
Turki	96	730
Pharna (GP)	193	3,850
Bhusahula	50	1,170
Karja	334	2,306
Lauhar	369	2,503
Milki Mir Chhaka	66	0
Bakhorapur English	86	0
Bakhorapur (GP)	304	4,903
Gangauli	72	101
Keshopur	42	1,153
Semaria Pararia (GP)	432	5,433
Mariam Chak	61	0
Dost Muhammad Chak	20	0
Barhara (GP & block headquarters)	193	6,889
Ekauna (GP)	605	7,597
Bishambharpur	408	1,292
Kuiya	121	1,235
Rampur	210	1,944
Kazi Chak	98	1349
Chatar	247	3,408
Ram Shahar	380	4,337
Matukpur (GP)	36	2,724
Ramsagar	116	2,130
Deorath	76	645
Panditpur	66	877
Agarpura	60	738
Babhangawan (GP)	151	2,731
Babura (GP)	1,842	28,412
Bishunpur (GP)	225	4,457
Molna Chak	57	0
Khawaspur	21	146
Latif Chak	11	0
Mah Chak	51	0
Faizullah Chak	2	0
Achhai Chak	23	0
Jalali Chak	10	0
Humaun Chak	28	0
Raepur Binganwan	607	2,486
Khawaspur (GP) (Unsurveyed)	0	15,074
Mahazi Dokti (Unsurveyed)	0	0
Dokti (Unsurveyed)	0	0
Rampur Kondarha (Unsurveyed)	0	0
Kondarha Uparwar (Unsurveyed)	0	0
Raghunathpur (Unsurveyed)	0	0
Sheo Diara (Unsurveyed)	3,549	11,634
