= Bhojpur district, India =

District in Bihar, India

Bhojpur district
- District of Bihar
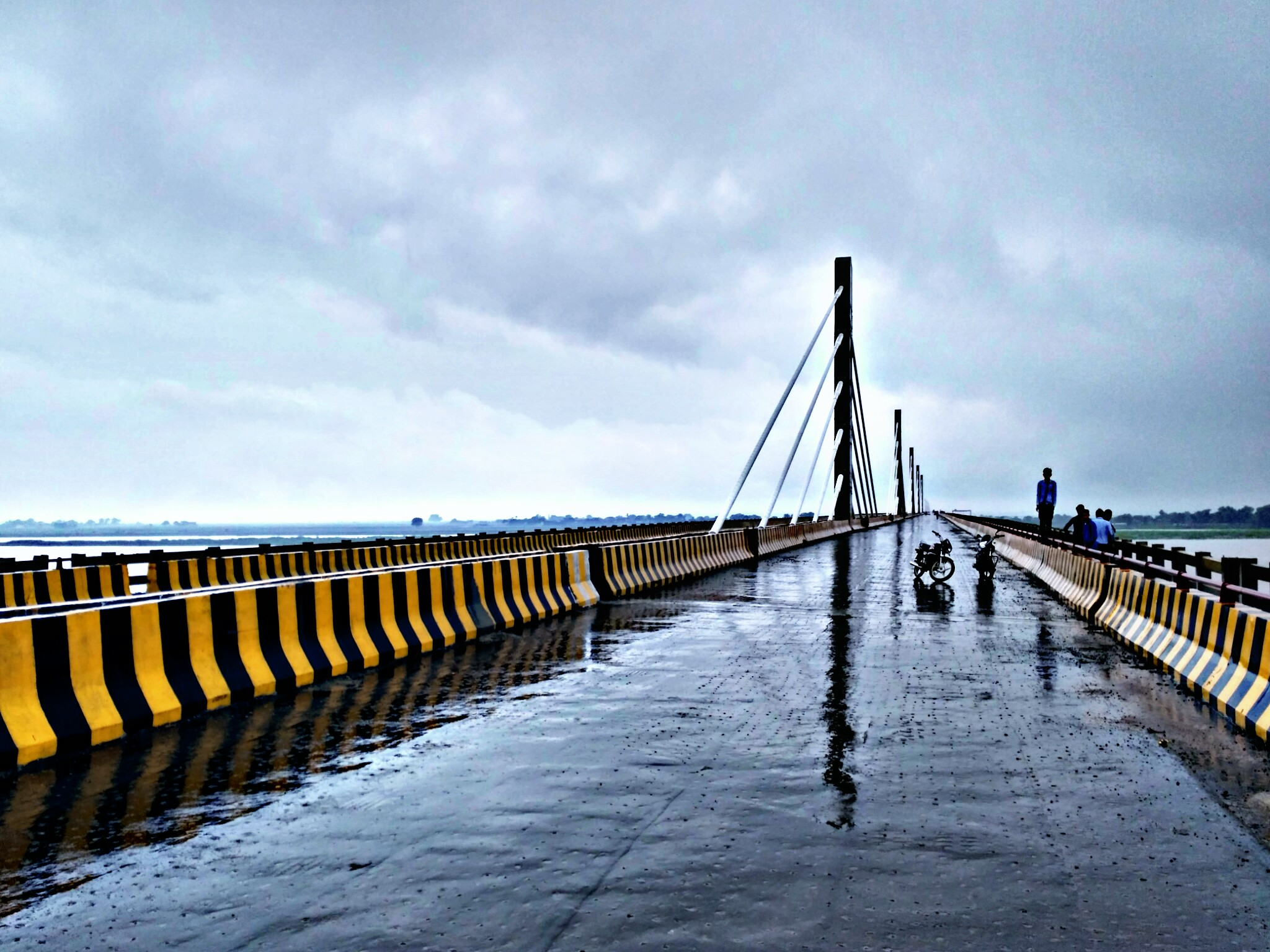
- Arrah–Chhapra Bridge
- Interactive map of Bhojpur district
- Coordinates (Arrah): 25°46′N 84°52′E
- Country: India
- State: Bihar
- Division: Patna
- Established: 1972
- Headquarters: Arrah
- Tehsils: Agiaon; Arrah; Barhara; Behea; Charpokhari; Garhani; Jagdishpur; Koilwar; Piro; Sahar; Sandesh; Shahpur; Tarari; Udwant Nagar

Government
  - District collector: Manesh Meena, I.A.S.
  - Lok Sabha constituencies: Arrah
  - Vidhan Sabha constituencies: Sandesh; Barhara; Arrah; Agiaon (SC); Tarari; Jagdishpur; Shahpur

Area
  - Total: 2,395 km^{2} (925 sq mi)

Population (2011)
  - Total: 2,728,407
  - Density: 1,139/km^{2} (2,951/sq mi)

Demographics
  - Literacy: 88.2% (2024)
- Time zone: UTC+05:30 (IST)
- PIN: 802301, 802302, 802312, 802313 (Bhojpur)
- Vehicle registration: BR-03
- Major highways: NH-922
- Website: bhojpur.nic.in

Bhojpur district is one of the 38 districts of the Indian state of Bihar. Arrah city (also known as Ara) is the administrative headquarters of this district. Bhojpur district came into existence in 1972. Earlier it was the part of Shahabad district.

In the year 1972, Shahabad district was bifurcated in two parts namely Bhojpur and Rohtas. Buxar was a subdivision of old Bhojpur district then. In 1992, Buxar became a separate district and presently the rest of Bhojpur district has now three sub-divisions – Ara Sadar, Jagdishpur and Piro. It shares its border with Uttar Pradesh in the north west.

== Geography ==
Bhojpur district occupies an area of 2,395 square kilometres (925 sq mi).

It is located (the headquarter Arrah) at a longitude of 83° 45' to 84° 45' East and the latitude is 25° 10' to 25° 40' North and is situated at a height of 193 meters above sea level.

== History ==
Till 1972, Bhojpur was part of old Shahabad district. The present district of Bhojpur came into existence in 1972, when Shahabad district was bifurcated in two parts namely Bhojpur and Rohtas. From 1972 to 1991, Buxar was a sub-division of Bhojpur district only. Later on 17 March 1991 Buxar district got separated from Bhojpur district. Bhojpur falls under Patna division.

== Economy ==
In 2006 the Indian government named Bhojpur one of the country's 250 most backward districts (out of a total of 640). It is one of the 38 districts in Bihar currently receiving funds from the Backward Regions Grant Fund Programme (BRGF).

== Climate ==
The climate of the district is of moderately extreme type. The summers are hot and the winter are cool. Most of the rain that the district receives is from the South- West monsoon, during July and August. Winters are quite dry and light showers may take place during the Rabi crop.

== Demographics ==
Historical population
Year	Pop.	±% p.a.
1901	641,566	—
1911	609,751	−0.51%
1921	593,796	−0.26%
1931	652,468	+0.95%
1941	762,131	+1.57%
1951	879,888	+1.45%
1961	1,021,109	+1.50%
1971	1,230,052	+1.88%
1981	1,490,714	+1.94%
1991	1,792,771	+1.86%
2001	2,243,144	+2.27%
2011	2,728,407	+1.98%

Religions in Bhojpur district (2011)
Religion	Percent
Hinduism	92.30%
Islam	7.25%
Other or not stated	0.45%

According to the 2011 census Bhojpur district, Bihar has a population of 2,728,407, roughly equal to the nation of Kuwait or the US state of Nevada. This gives it a ranking of 145th in India (out of a total of 640). The district has a population density of 1,136 inhabitants per square kilometre (2,940/sq mi). Its population growth rate over the decade 2001–2011 was 21.27%. Bhojpur has a sex ratio of 907 females for every 1000 males, and a literacy rate of 72.79%. 14.29% of the population lives in urban areas. Scheduled Castes and Scheduled Tribes make up 15.59% and 0.51% of the population respectively.

=== Languages ===
Languages in Bhojpur district (2011)
1. Bhojpuri (92.1%)
2. Hindi (5.23%)
3. Urdu (2.50%)
4. Other (0.21%)

At the time of the 2011 Census of India, 92.06% of the population in the district spoke Bhojpuri, 5.23% Hindi and 2.50% Urdu as their first language. Bhojpuri is considered a Hindi dialect in the census, so in census data its speakers are categorized as speaking Hindi.

Languages include Bhojpuri, a language with almost 2,000,000 speakers, according to the study of 'Times of India Daily' written in both the Devanagari and Kaithi scripts, Hindi and Urdu.

== Administration ==
The Bhojpur district (headquartered at Arrah) is headed by an IAS officer of the rank of District Magistrate (DM).

The district has got 1209 villages under 228 Gram Panchayats, 34 territorial police stations and 1 municipality, Arrah, which has now become a Municipal Corporation.

=== Tehsils ===
Bhojpur district comprises three tehsils or Sub-divisions, each headed by a Sub-Divisional Magistrate (SDM):

1. Arrah Sadar
2. Jagdishpur
3. Piro

=== Blocks ===
These Tehsils are further divided into 14 Blocks, each headed by a Block Development Officer (BDO)

1. Arrah
2. Agiaon
3. Barhara
4. Bihiya
5. Charpokhari
6. Garhani
7. Jagdispur
8. Koilwar
9. Piro
10. Udwantnagar
11. Sahar
12. Sandesh
13. Shahpur
14. Tarari

== Politics ==
District	No.	Constituency	Name	Party	Alliance	Remarks
Bhojpur	192	Sandesh	Radha Charan Sah	JD(U)	NDA	
Bhojpur	193	Barhara	Raghvendra Pratap Singh	BJP	NDA	
Bhojpur	194	Arrah	Sanjay Singh Tiger	BJP	NDA	Minister
Bhojpur	195	Agiaon (SC)	Mahesh Paswan	BJP	NDA	
Bhojpur	196	Tarari	Vishal Prashant	BJP	NDA	
Bhojpur	197	Jagdishpur	Bhagwan Singh Kushwaha	JD(U)	NDA	
Bhojpur	198	Shahpur	Rakesh Ojha	BJP	NDA	

== Education ==
Colleges

- Veer Kunwar Singh University
- Harprasad Das Jain College
- Maharaja College, Arrah
- Jagjiwan College

== Notable people ==
=== Freedom fighter ===
- Veer Kunwar Singh, leader of the Indian Rebellion of 1857 in Bihar.
- Hare Krishna Singh, commander-in-chief of Kunwar Singh's forces during the rebellion.
- Sachchidananda Sinha, interim President of the Constituent Assembly of India, member of the Imperial Legislative Council and the Indian Legislative Assembly.
- Abdul Qaiyum Ansari, freedom fighter, President of All India Momin conference; fought against Jinnah's two nation theory, cabinet minister of Bihar, member of parliament.
- Professor Abdul Bari, freedom fighter, head of Tata worker's union, founders of Bihar
- Bharat Bhushan Tiwari is regarded as the Mangal Pandey of a new struggle against entrenched colonial mindsets.

=== Politics ===
- Babu Jagjivan Ram, Deputy Prime Minister of India, Defense Minister of India during 1971 India Pakistan war.
- Meira Kumar, first woman Speaker of the Lok Sabha; former Union Minister and former Indian ambassador to Spain and the UK.
- Jagat Narain Lal, general secretary of Hindu Mahasabha.
- Ram Subhag Singh, former Union Minister; He was the leader of India's first Opposition in the Lok Sabha (1969-1970).
- Shailendra Nath Shrivastava Former MP of Patna
- Bindeshwari Dubey, Chief Minister of Bihar. Union minister for Law and Justice in Rajiv Gandhi's cabinet
- Anant Sharma, former Governor of Punjab and West Bengal; former Union Minister in Government of India during Indira Gandhi's time.
- Amrendra Pratap Singh, Cabinet Minister of Agriculture in Government of Bihar.
- Brahmeshwar Singh, head of Ranvir Sena.
- Jagdish Mahto, founder of Naxal movement in Ekwari, member of CPI (ML).
- Shivanand Tiwari, ex-Cabinet Minister in Government of Bihar and former Rajya Sabha MP on JDU ticket.

=== Government office holders ===
- Bhuvaneshwar Prasad Sinha, 6th Chief Justice of India (1 October 1959 – 31 January 1964).
- B.P. Singh, Judge at the Supreme Court of India, Chief Justice of Bombay High Court, Grandson of Bhuvaneshwar Prasad Sinha.
- Krishna Ballabh Narayan Singh, Ex-Chief Justice of the Patna High Court from 1976 to 1982. (a native of Kulharia)
- Anil Sinha, Director of the Central Bureau of Investigation (CBI) from 2014 to 2016.
- Shashi Bhushan Sahai (IPS), Director-General of Bihar Police.
- Muni Lall (IAS), Ex-Union Minister of India and Lok Sabha MP of Sasaram from 1996 to 2004.
- Ravi Sinha (IPS), Secretary of RAW from 1 July 2023 – 30 June 2025.

=== Academia & literature ===
- Vashishtha Narayan Singh, mathematician.
- Amitava Kumar, English writer, Helen D. Lockwood Chair Professor at Vassar College
- Acharya Shivpujan Sahay, Hindi novelist.
- Mithileshwar, Hindi writer.

=== Television & film personalities ===
- S. H. Bihari, Bollywood lyricist.
- Shailendra (lyricist), Bollywood lyricist.
- Vinay Pathak, actor.
- Pawan Singh, singer and actor.
- Neeraj Pandey, filmmaker.
- Vishal Aditya Singh, actor.

== Villages ==
- Bakhorapur
- Ekwari
- Jalpura Tapa
- Kulharia
- Masarh
- Sakaddi
- Sarthua
- Belauthi
