= Sone Canal System =

Irrigation network in Bihar, India

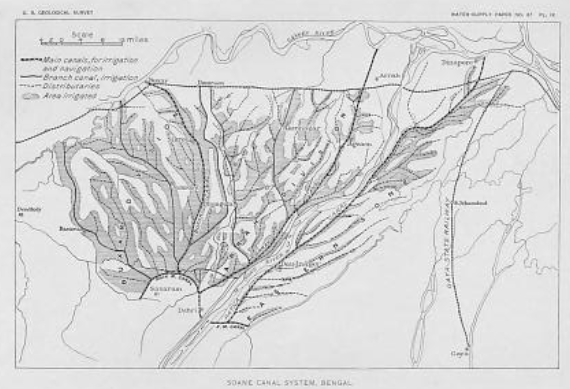
A historical map of the Sone Canal System

The Sone Canal System is a major 19th-century riverine irrigation network in the Indian state of Bihar. Originating from the Son River, it was a colonial-era engineering project designed to irrigate the plains of the historic Shahabad, Gaya, and Patna districts. The system's original 1874 anicut at Dehri has since been replaced by the modern Indrapuri Barrage, located 10 km upstream.

Today, the network comprises the original Sone Low Level Canal System and a later expansion known as the Sone High Level Canal System. It provides critical irrigation to seven districts but faces challenges related to aging infrastructure and water management, which are being addressed under the National Hydrology Project (NHP).

== History and development ==
The concept for a large-scale irrigation project using the Son River was first proposed in 1853 by C. H. Dickens. The project's planning and execution faced significant delays, first because of prolonged technical discussions and later being by the Indian Rebellion of 1857. Initially, the Government of India offered the project to the East India Irrigation and Canal Company, a private enterprise. However, in 1868, the government bought the company's interest for 10.5 lakhs of rupees and took control of the works. Construction officially commenced the following year in 1869.

By 1873, sufficient progress had been made to supply water to the Arrah Canal on an emergency basis to relieve a drought. The entire system was completed a few years later, and water began to be supplied regularly on a payment basis from the year 1876-77.

=== Post-independence modernization and water sharing ===
In the decades following its initial construction, the system underwent significant changes. The original 1874 anicut at Dehri was decommissioned and replaced by the Indrapuri Barrage, constructed in the 1960s about 10 km upstream to improve water diversion.

The flow of the Sone River was further affected by the construction of upstream dams, including the Rihand Dam (1962) in Uttar Pradesh and the Bansagar Dam in Madhya Pradesh. To ensure equitable water distribution for irrigation, the Bansagar Agreement was signed in 1973 by the states of Bihar, Uttar Pradesh, and Madhya Pradesh. Under this agreement, Bihar was allocated a total of 7.75 Million Acre-Feet (MAF) of water from the Son River annually for the canal system.

== Water management and operational history ==
While the infrastructure of the canal system was established in the 19th century, the methods for managing water distribution have evolved significantly over time, facing different socio-economic pressures.

=== Original design and purpose ===
The Sone Canal System was originally designed not for total irrigation, but primarily as a protective system against drought, particularly for the kharif rice crop. Its design was based on the assumption that it would provide supplemental water, with a "design duty" of 133 acres per cusec, and that no more than 50% of the command area would be under rice cultivation at any given time.

=== The Satta System (1876-1974) ===
Under the Bengal Irrigation Act of 1876, water was managed through a system of formal requests known as satta. Farmers had to submit a satta to canal officers to receive a sanctioned water supply. A village-level official, the sattadar, was responsible for managing the water delivery from the government-controlled canal outlet to the farmers. Villagers were collectively responsible for constructing and maintaining the watercourses beyond this outlet. For decades, this system was reported to have worked effectively.

=== Post-independence changes and a shift in policy ===
After India's independence in 1947, the situation changed radically. A growing population led to increased demand for irrigation. The government began to view irrigation as a welfare service rather than a commercial venture, keeping water rates low. This resulted in inadequate revenue for the proper operation and maintenance of the aging canal network. Simultaneously, the authority of local field-level officers was reduced as power became more centralized, making it difficult to enforce rules and punish those who illegally diverted water.

Due to these pressures, the original satta system was deemed unmanageable and was abandoned in 1974. It was replaced by a new system where formal applications were not required, and assessments were based on a register of irrigated land. This new system was a failure, as it led to farmers in the upper reaches taking excessive water by obstructing canals, while farmers at the tail-end often received none.

=== Reintroduction of the Satta System ===
In 1988, the government reintroduced the sattadar system. However, the underlying issues of increased demand, inadequate finances for maintenance, and a lack of local participation in management remained. According to studies in the 1990s, the reintroduced system struggled to function effectively due to these persistent root causes.

== Infrastructure and key components ==
The headworks of the modern Sone Canal System is the Indrapuri Barrage, located near Dehri. Constructed in the 1960s to replace the original anicut, it is a 1,410-meter-long structure that diverts the Son River's water into the system's two main canals: the Main Western Canal and the Main Eastern Canal. It replaced the original Dehri Anicut, which was built between 1869 and 1875. The old anicut was an 12,469-foot-long (approx. 3.8 km) weir made of rubble stone and masonry, equipped with scouring sluices to regulate water flow.

=== System expansion: High Level Canals ===
To provide irrigation to upper areas that were outside the command of the original system, two High Level Canals were constructed: the Sone Western High Level Canal (80.42 km) and the Sone Eastern High Level Canal (81.68 km). With this expansion, the original network came to be known as the Sone Low Level Canal System.

== Main canals and distributaries ==
The system is centered around the Main Western and Main Eastern canals. The Main Western Canal is the primary feeder for the old Shahabad district, supplying several major branch canals:

- Arrah Canal: Branches off the Main Western Canal at its 5th mile. It runs for 60.5 miles, passing the town of Arrah before flowing into the Gangi River. It was designed for both irrigation and navigation, featuring 13 locks to overcome a total fall of 180 feet.
- Buxar Canal: Leaves the Main Western Canal at its 12th mile and runs for 45 miles to join the Ganges at Buxar. It was also intended for navigation and has 12 locks.
- Bihiya Canal: A major offshoot of the Arrah Canal, with a length of 31 miles.
- Dumraon Canal: Another principal offshoot of the Arrah Canal, running for 40 miles.
- Chausa Canal: The main branch of the Buxar Canal, with a length of 40 miles

== Scope and impact ==
The Sone Canal System is extensive in its scale. The modern network has a total length of approximately 3,266 km, comprising 158 km of main canals, 308 km of branch canals, and about 2,800 km of distributary and minor canals. It was originally designed to carry a maximum volume of 6,350 cubic feet of water per second. The system's command area is spread across seven districts in South Bihar: Rohtas, Bhojpur, Buxar, Kaimur, Patna, Gaya, and Aurangabad. The Western Canal System serves the first four districts (the former Shahabad region), while the Eastern Canal System serves the latter three.

Its primary impact was on the agricultural economy of the region. Approximately 80% of the land irrigated by the system lay within the old Shahabad district, with the remainder in Gaya (11%) and Patna (9%) districts. In addition to irrigation, the system provided 132 miles of navigable canals within Shahabad, aiding transport and commerce.

=== Modern challenges and socio-economic impact ===
As an old system, the Sone Canal network faces significant challenges in the 21st century. These include considerable water loss due to unlined canals, the absence of modern control structures and gates, and low field application efficiency. These issues have led to a situation of crisis and distress for farmers in the command area and are the focus of modernization efforts under the National Hydrology Project.

Technical Assessment of Seepage Loss

The issue of water loss from unlined canals has been enumerated by latest academic studies. A 2021 study concentrating on the Arrah Main Canal, conducted by researchers at NIT Patna, highlighted the severity of the problem. The research noted that the canal's effective irrigation capacity had reduced from its original design of 161 m³/s to 119 m³/s, with seepage being a main reason.

Through direct measurements, the research found that water loss due to seepage in various unlined sections of the Arrah Main Canal ranged from 2.2% to 8.35% of the total inflow. The rate of loss in some sections was found to be greater than the standards specified for unlined canals in India, a fact attributed to the permeable sandy and loamy soils of the canal bed. The paper concluded by recommending that high-loss reaches of the canal be lined to improve water conveyance efficiency.

Water Management and Protests

In the early 2000s, a model of participatory management was introduced through the formation of local "Distributary Committees" to oversee water distribution. However, this system has faced controversy, leading to allegations of mismanagement, corruption, and the illegal diversion of water. These issues have sometimes resulted in drought-like conditions in the tail-end reaches of the canal, even in years with adequate water in the system's upper reaches.

For example, many farmer-led protests occurred in 2009 in areas like Paliganj and Arwal, where farmers blockaded roads to demand action against illegal water diversions and the destruction of unauthorized dams built on the canals to hoard water. These agitations highlighted the distress faced by farmers in the lower command areas.

Impact on Agriculture

The reduced reliability of water supply has reportedly forced changes in cropping patterns in some tail-end areas. A notable example is in the Maner block, where farmers have shifted from cultivating water-intensive rice to less water-dependent crops like bajra (pearl millet) due to persistent water shortages.
