= List of bridges in Arrah =

This article lists the major bridges of the city of Arrah, Bihar, India, and its neighbouring regions. It includes river crossings, railway bridges and fly overs. This is a partial list.

== River crossings ==
=== Gangi River ===
The Gangi River is the main river that flows in the middle northern periphery of Arrah.

Portrait	Name	Type	Dates opened	North Bank	South Bank	Maintained by
	Gangi Bridge		2002	Gausganj	Mirganj	
	Balbatra Bridge (Lakadiya Pul)			Balbatra	Arrah	

=== Sone River ===
The Sone River acts as the eastern boundary of the Bhojpur district.

Portrait	Name	Type	Dates opened	West Bank	East Bank	Maintained by
	Koilwar Bridge	Lattice girder	1862	Koilwar	Patna	Indian Railways
	New Koilwar Bridge		2020	Koilawar	Patna	NHAI

==== Ganges ====
The Ganges acts as the northern periphery of the district.

Portrait	Name	Type	Dates opened	North Bank	South Bank	Maintained by
	Arrah–Chhapra Bridge	Extradosed bridge	2017	Chhapra	Arrah	NHAI

=== Arrah Canal ===
The Arrah Canal runs through the middle of the city, emptying into the Gangi River.

- Dharahara Bridge

== Road and foot bridges ==
- Overbridge, Katira
