= List of rivers of Bihar =

This is an incomplete Alphabetical list of the rivers that either partially of fully in the Indian state of Bihar.

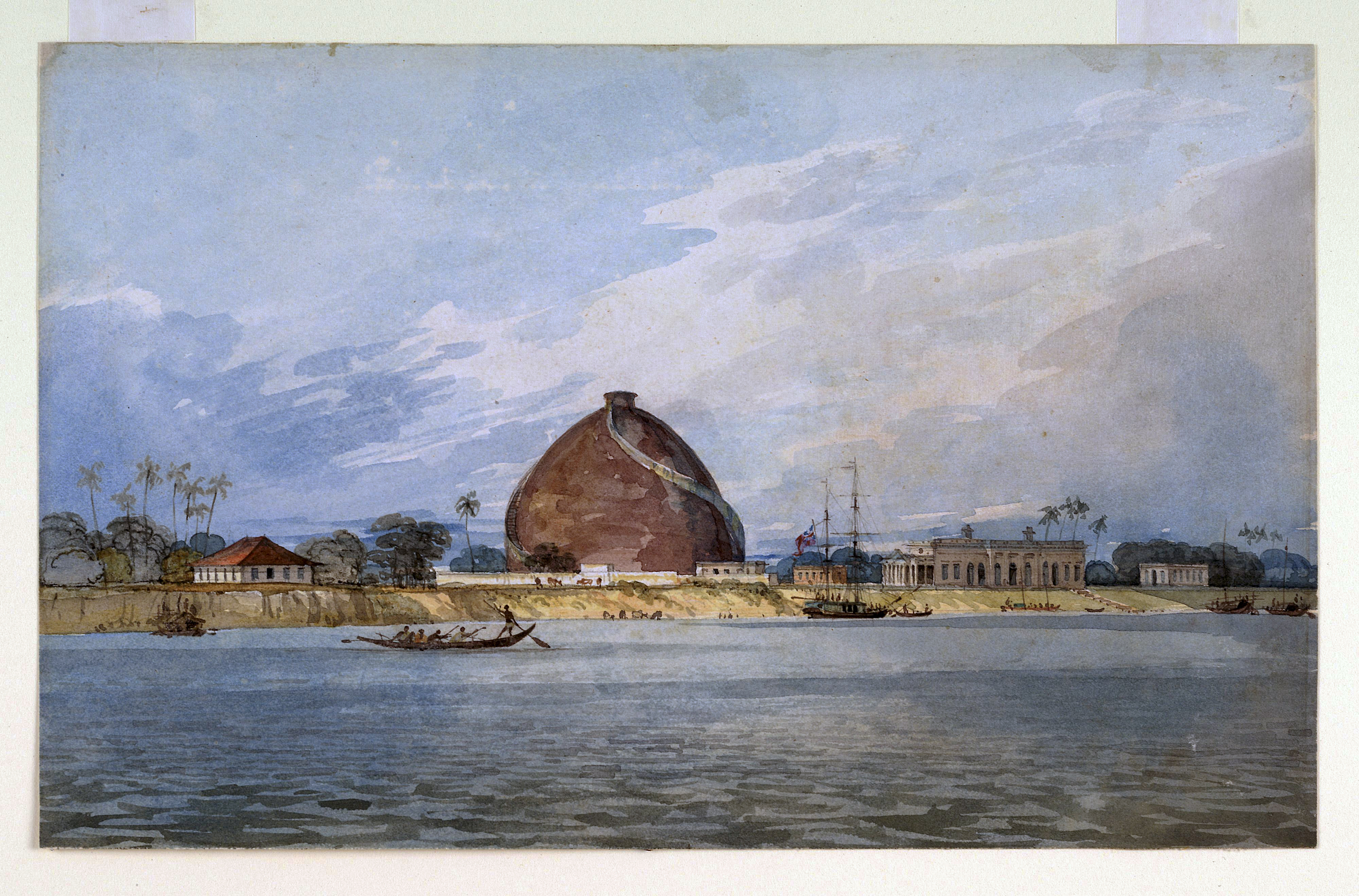
Golghar and Patna at the bank of Ganges

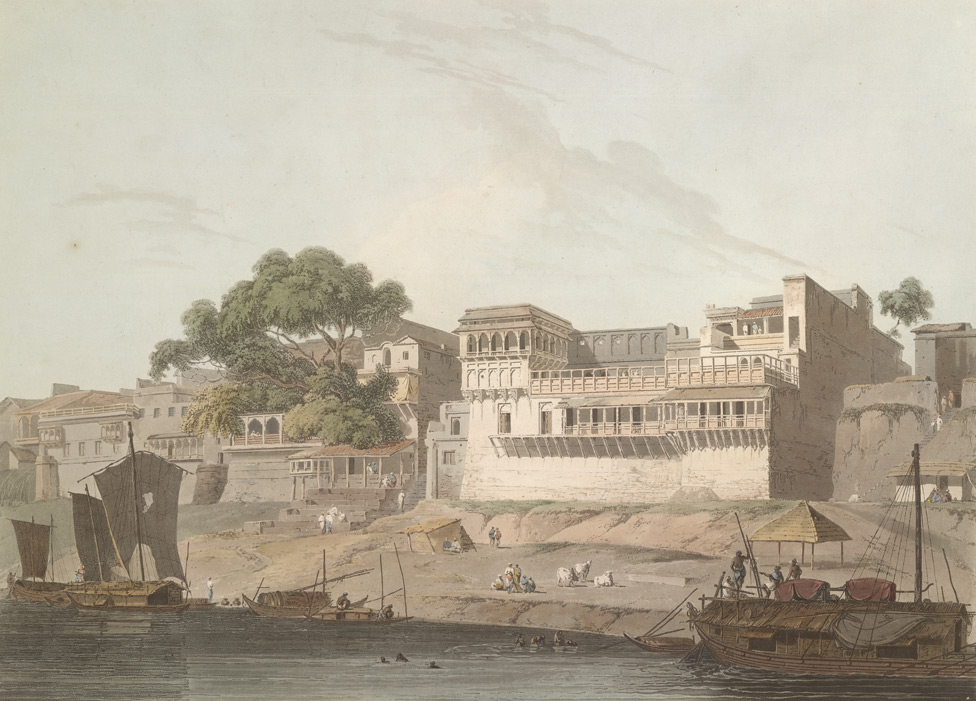
19th Century Painting depicing parts of Patna at the Bank of Ganga

== A ==
- Ajay River

== B ==
- Bagmati River
- Banas River
- Burhi Gandak River

== C ==
- Chandan River

== D ==
- Daha River
- Dharmawati River
- Dhouns River
- Durgavati River

== G ==
- Gandaki River
- Ganges
- Gangi River

== K ==
- Kamala River
- Kankai River
- Karmanasa River
- Kiul River
- Kosi River
- Kulik River

== L ==
- Lakhandei River

== M ==
- Mahananda River
- Mechi River
- Mohana River

== P ==
- Phalgu River
- Punpun River

== R ==
- Ratnawati River

== S ==
- Sone River
- Suar River

== T ==
- Thumhani River
