= Banas River (Arrah) =

River in Bihar, India

The Banas River (also known as Banas Nadi) is a river in the Bhojpur district of Bihar. It is one of at least three different rivers in India to share the name Banas. This river is key drainage channel in the plain areas surrounding the city of Arrah.

== Etymology ==
The archaeologist Alexander Cunningham suggested that the river's name could be a derivative of the Sanskrit names Parnasa or Parna Vaha.

== Course and features ==
Banas as originates in the southern region of the Ekwari division as a spill channel from the Sone River near the village of Belta. It flows north for approximately 24 miles as the primary drainage channel for the land situated between the Arrah Canal and the Bihiya distributary canal. After passing under the railway line between Arrah and Bihiya, the river turns to the east, eventually flowing into the Gangi River. The Gangi further falls in the Ganges.
