= Lahang Dumariya =

Village in Bihar, India

- village
- Location in Bihar, India
- Coordinates: 25°36′42″N 84°30′16″E
- Country: India
- State: Bihar
- District: Bhojpur

Languages
  - Official: Bhojpuri, Hindi
- Time zone: UTC+5:30 (IST)
- PIN: 802151
- Telephone code: 06181

Lahang Dumariya is a village in the Bhojpur district of the state of Bihar in India. It is located approximately 25 km from the major city of Ara. Lahang Dumariya consists of eight patti. The village is integrated, as several castes live together.

The government-run Rajkiya Madhya Vidyalaya school is located in the east side of the village. The Behea road to Salempur is also in the east side of the village, along with a temple to the god Shiva in Purana Dih. There is a large Rajput population here.

The village has a number of historic temples, such as Maa Kali Temple, Thakurbari, Goreya Baba temple, Barkhandi Baba temple and a historic Akhada in front of the Hanuman temple.
