= Phulai, Bhojpur =

Phulai
- Village
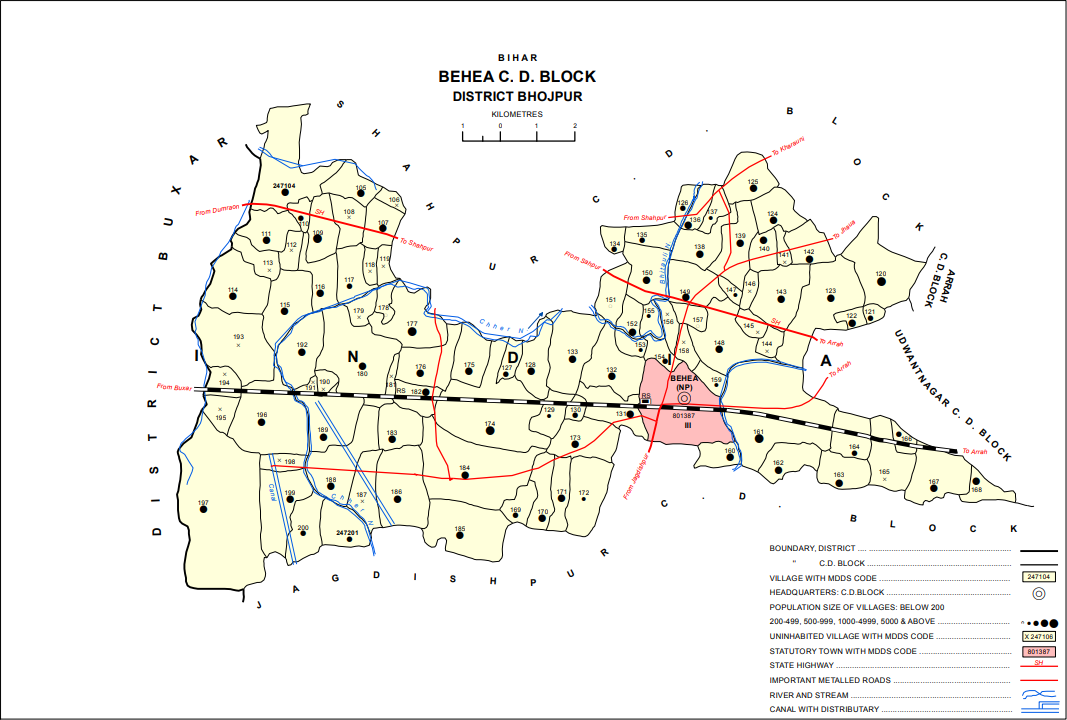
- Map of Phulai (#169) in Behea block

- Location in Bihar, India Phulai (India)
- Coordinates: 25.53926°N 84.41552°E
- Country: India
- State: Bihar
- District: Bhojpur

Area
  - Total: 0.065 km^{2} (0.025 sq mi)
- Elevation: 66 m (217 ft)

Population (2011)
  - Total: 955
  - Density: 15,000/km^{2} (38,000/sq mi)

Languages
  - Official: Bhojpuri, Hindi
- Time zone: UTC+5:30 (IST)

Phulai is a village in the southern part of Bihiya block in Bhojpur district, Bihar, India. As of 2011, its population was 955, in 135 households.
