= Chakwath =

Chakwath Chakwāth
- Village
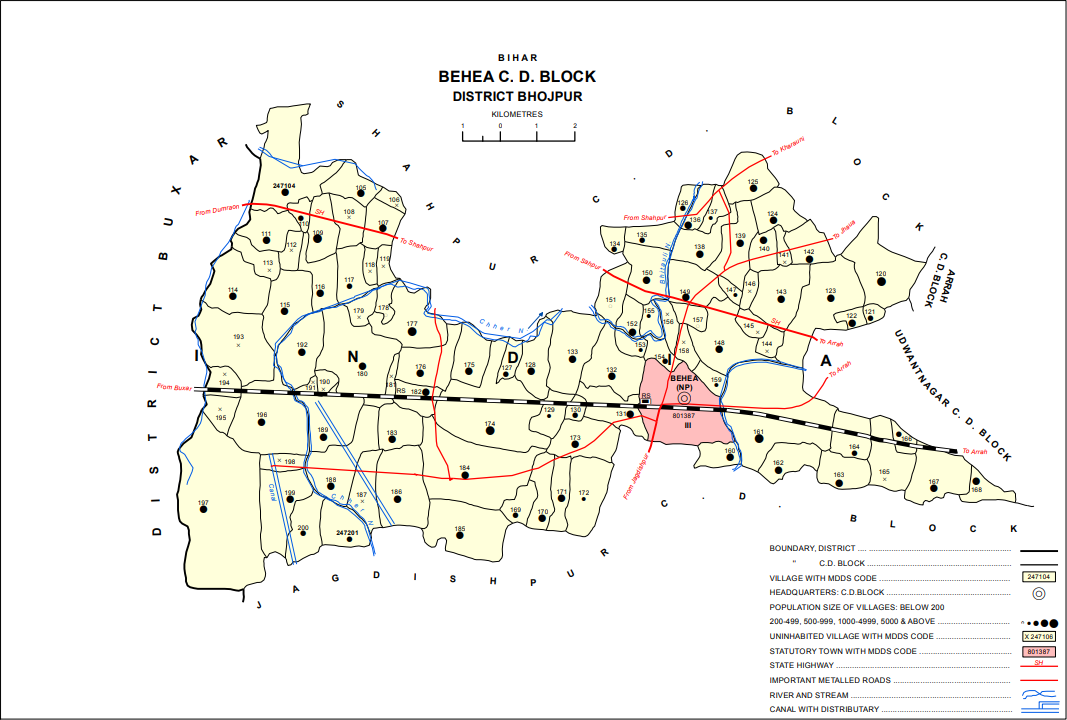
- Map of Chakwath (#184) in Behea block

- Location in Bihar, India Chakwath (India)
- Coordinates: 25.54201°N 84.41319°E
- Country: India
- State: Bihar
- District: Bhojpur

Area
  - Total: 0.482 km^{2} (0.186 sq mi)
- Elevation: 68 m (223 ft)

Population (2011)
  - Total: 4,964
  - Density: 10,300/km^{2} (26,700/sq mi)

Languages
  - Official: Bhojpuri, Hindi
- Time zone: UTC+5:30 (IST)

Chakwath is a village in Bihiya block of Bhojpur district, Bihar, India. As of 2011, its population was 4,964, in 760 households.
