= Harihobans =

Rajput Clan

Harihobans departed from the Heheya Kingdom are a clan of Rajputs that reside mainly at Bhojpur district of Bihar with a smaller community also present in Ballia district of Uttar Pradesh. They were the rulers of Bihiya and under the leadership of Ram Pal Singh.

According to their history, they were originally settled at Ratanpur in the Central Provinces but in 850 A.D., they migrated northwards to Manjha on the Gogra in the Saran district, where they waged successful war with the aboriginal Cheros. Two centuries later, they left Manjha and settled south of the Ganges at Bihiya, and after a struggle lasting several hundred years subdued the Cheros who then held the country.
