= Hirdepur, Bihiya =

Hirdepur
- Village
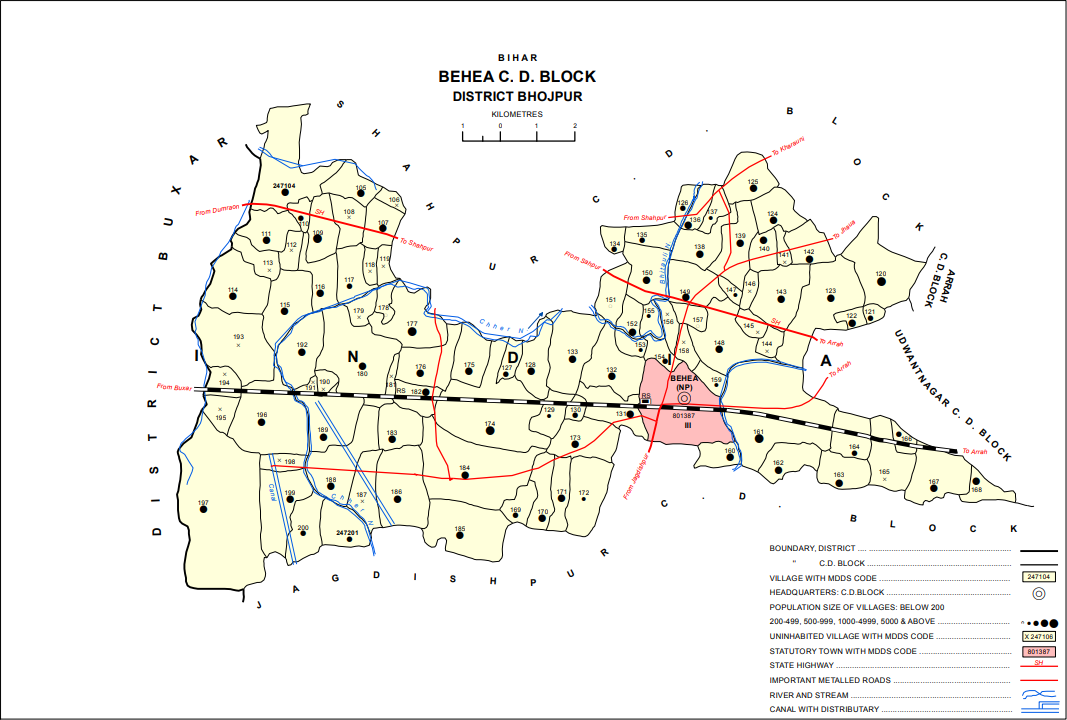
- Map of Hirdepur (#129) in Behea block

- Location in Bihar, India Hirdepur (India)
- Coordinates: 25.56237°N 84.4284°E
- Country: India
- State: Bihar
- District: Bhojpur

Area
  - Total: 0.089 km^{2} (0.034 sq mi)
- Elevation: 62 m (203 ft)

Population (2011)
  - Total: 294
  - Density: 3,300/km^{2} (8,600/sq mi)

Languages
  - Official: Bhojpuri, Hindi
- Time zone: UTC+5:30 (IST)

Hirdepur is a small village in Bihiya block of Bhojpur district in Bihar, India. As of 2011, its population was 294, in 39 households. It is located west of the town of Bihiya.
