= Andar, Bhojpur =

Andar
- Village
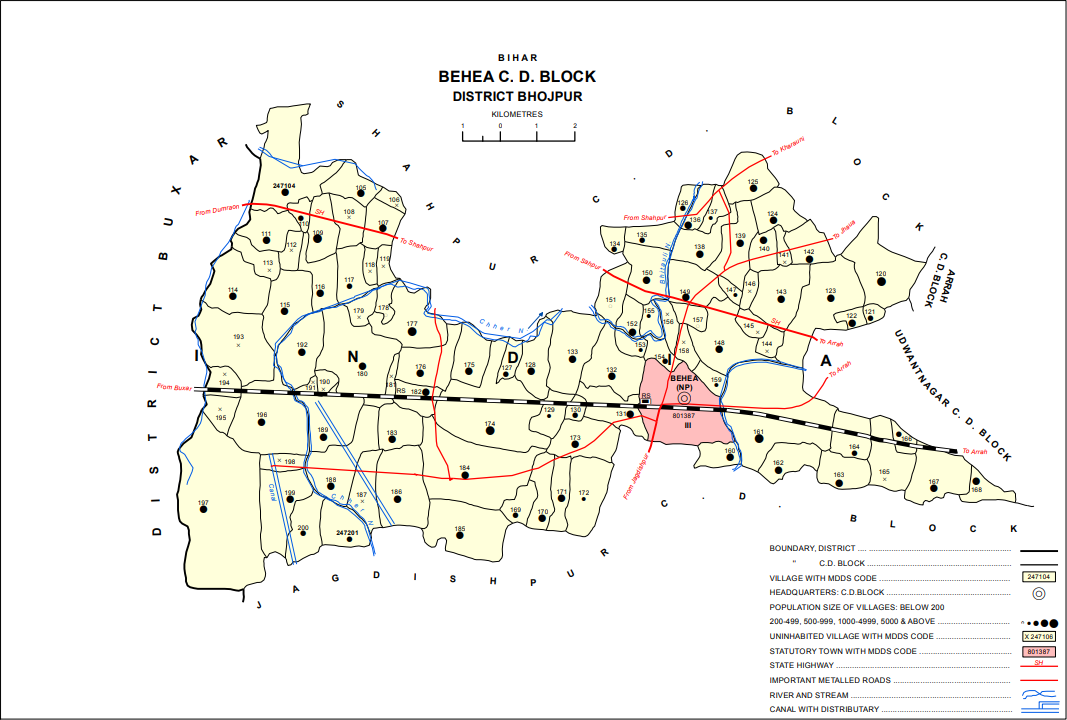
- Map of Andar (#133) in Behea block

- Location in Bihar, India Andar (India)
- Coordinates: 25.57356°N 84.43357°E
- Country: India
- State: Bihar
- District: Bhojpur

Area
  - Total: 0.219 km^{2} (0.085 sq mi)
- Elevation: 62 m (203 ft)

Population (2011)
  - Total: 1,790
  - Density: 8,170/km^{2} (21,200/sq mi)

Languages
  - Official: Bhojpuri, Hindi
- Time zone: UTC+5:30 (IST)

Andar is a village in Bihiya block of Bhojpur district in Bihar, India. As of 2011, its population was 1,790, in 265 households.
