= Osain, Bhojpur =

Osain Osāin
- Village
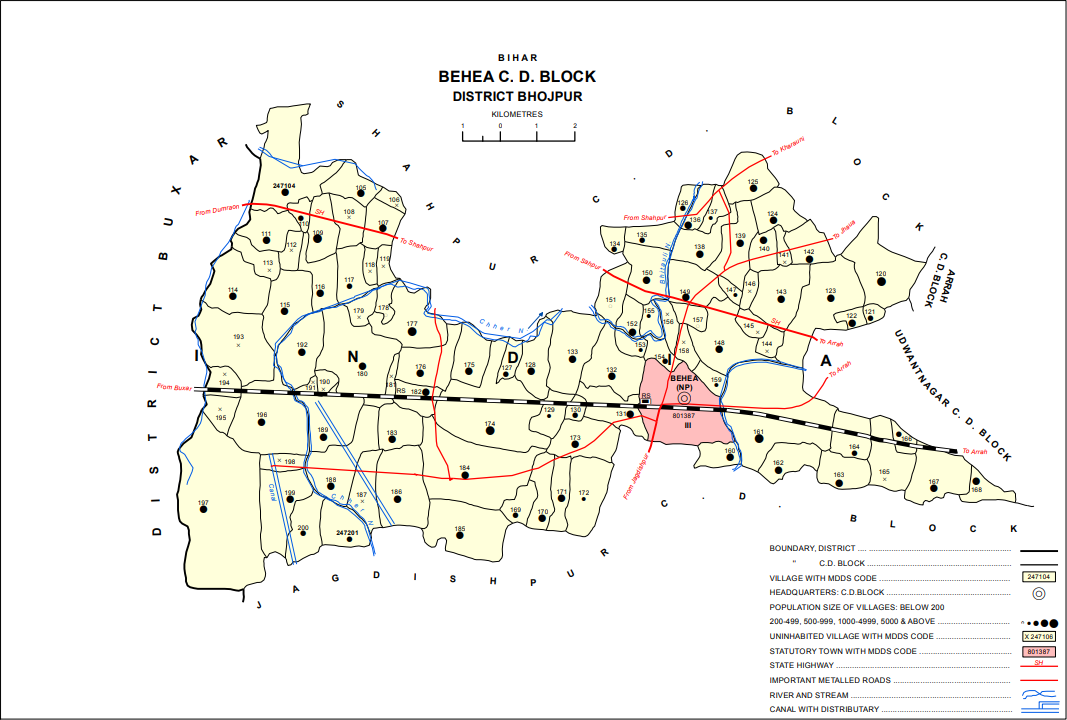
- Map of Osain (#174) in Behea block

- Location in Bihar, India Osain (India)
- Coordinates: 25.55753°N 84.40949°E
- Country: India
- State: Bihar
- District: Bhojpur

Area
  - Total: 0.480 km^{2} (0.185 sq mi)
- Elevation: 69 m (226 ft)

Population (2011)
  - Total: 6,308
  - Density: 13,100/km^{2} (34,000/sq mi)

Languages
  - Official: Bhojpuri, Hindi
- Time zone: UTC+5:30 (IST)

Osain is a village in the west-central part of Bihiya block in Bhojpur district, Bihar, India. As of 2011, its population was 6,308, in 966 households.
