= Mahuaon =

Mahuaon Mahuāon
- Village
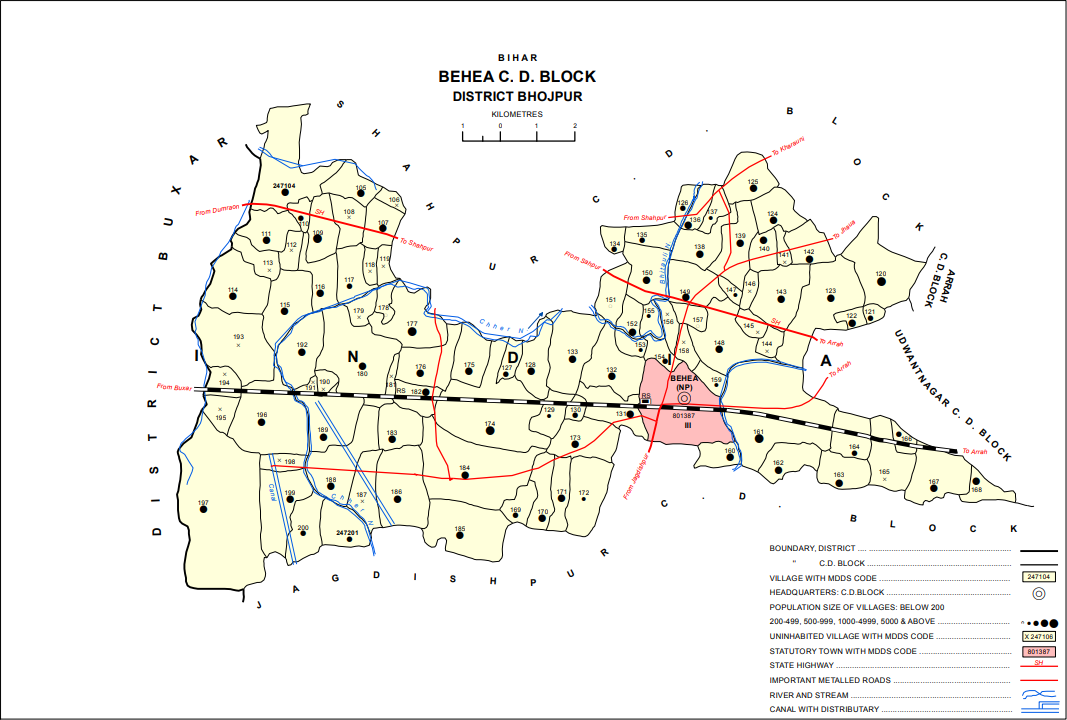
- Map of Mahuaon (#185) in Behea block

- Location in Bihar, India Mahuaon (India)
- Coordinates: 25.5314°N 84.39812°E
- Country: India
- State: Bihar
- District: Bhojpur

Area
  - Total: 0.291 km^{2} (0.112 sq mi)
- Elevation: 69 m (226 ft)

Population (2011)
  - Total: 3,093
  - Density: 10,600/km^{2} (27,500/sq mi)

Languages
  - Official: Bhojpuri, Hindi
- Time zone: UTC+5:30 (IST)

Mahuaon is a village in the southern part of Bihiya block, in Bhojpur district, Bihar, India. As of 2011, its population was 3,093, in 457 households.
