= Dubauli, Bihiya =

Dubauli
- Village
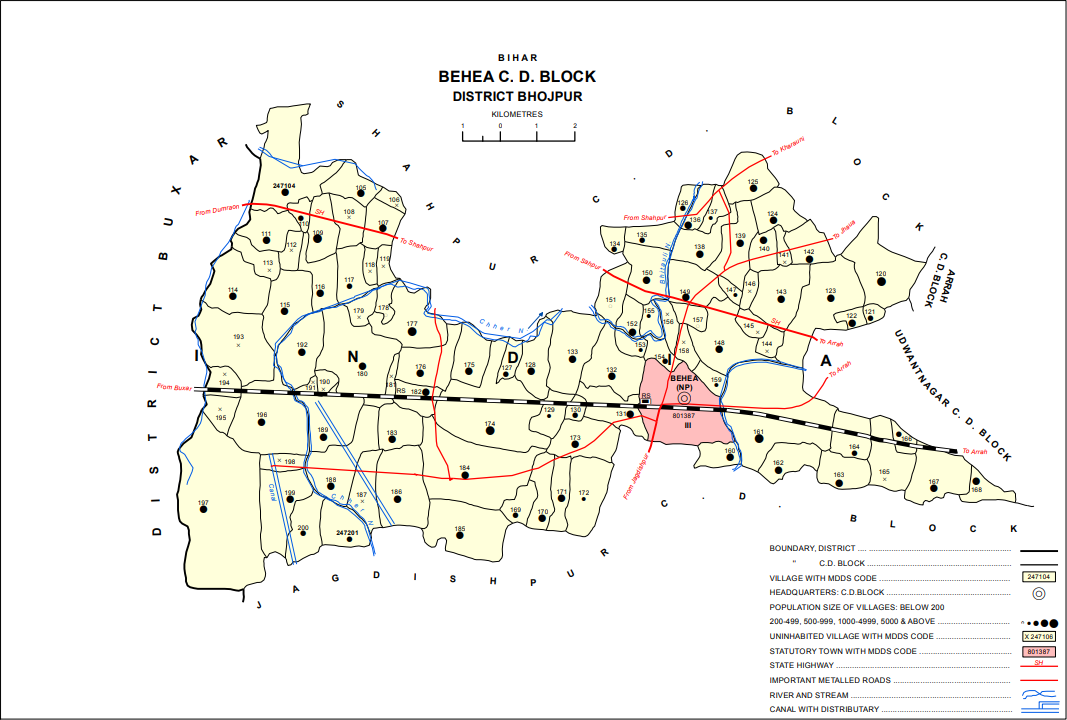
- Map of Dubauli (#155) in Behea block

- Location in Bihar, India Dubauli (India)
- Coordinates: 25.58064°N 84.45291°E
- Country: India
- State: Bihar
- District: Bhojpur

Area
  - Total: 0.028 km^{2} (0.011 sq mi)
- Elevation: 62 m (203 ft)

Population (2011)
  - Total: 224
  - Density: 8,000/km^{2} (21,000/sq mi)

Languages
  - Official: Bhojpuri, Hindi
- Time zone: UTC+5:30 (IST)

Dubauli is a small village in Bihiya block of Bhojpur district in Bihar, India. As of 2011, its population was 224, in 33 households. It is located a short distance northwest of the town of Bihiya.
