= Bastipur, India =

Bastipur
- village
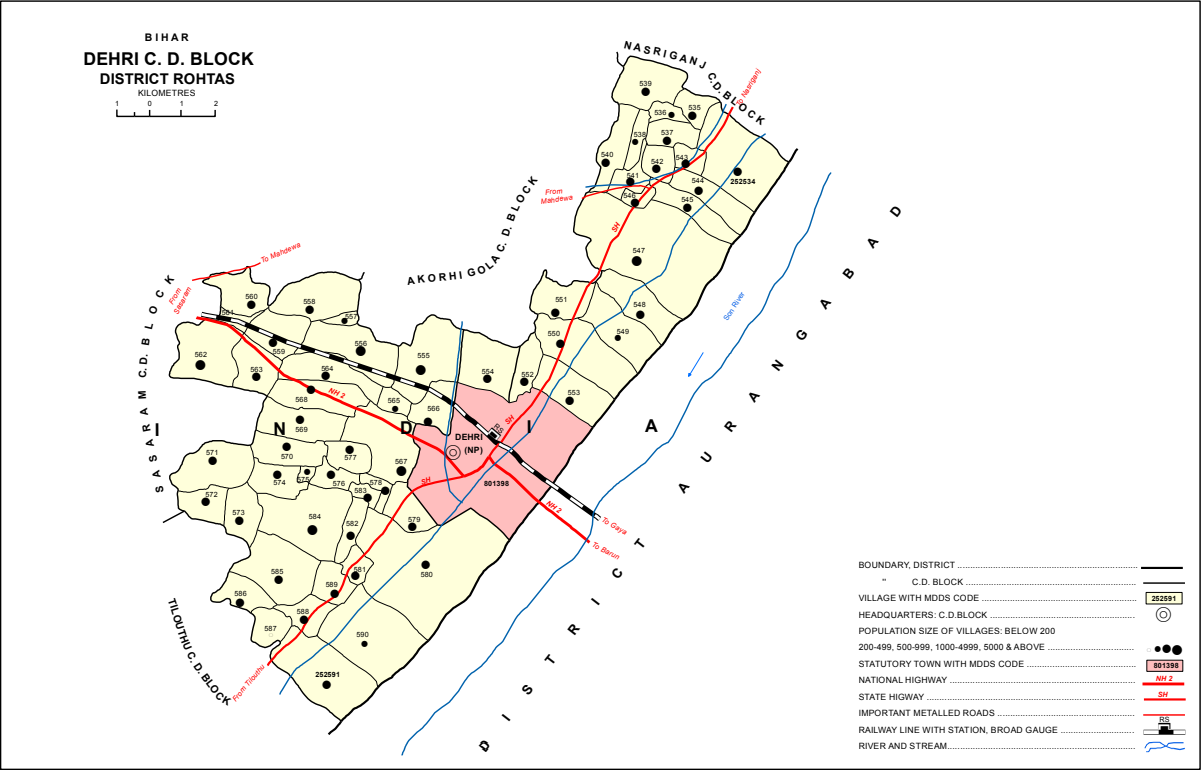
- Map showing Bastipur (#579) in Dehri block.

- Location in Bihar, India Bastipur (India)
- Coordinates: 24.8906214°N 84.1586691°E
- Country: India
- State: Bihar
- District: Rohtas

Government
  - Type: Panchayati raj
  - Body: Gram panchayat
- Elevation: 99 m (325 ft)

Languages
  - Official: Bhojpuri, Hindi
- Time zone: UTC+5:30 (IST)
- ISO 3166 code: IN-BR
- Nearest city: Dehri
- Literacy: 70%
- Climate: Monsoon (Köppen)

Bastipur is a village and a municipality in Rohtas district in the state of Bihar, India. Its PIN code is 821307.

== Geography and climate ==
Bastipur (map) is near Dehri and Sasaram, in Bihar, India. This village is situated at the bank of the Sone River with an average elevation of 99 metres (324 feet) and is also surrounded partially by the Kaimur Range.

== Demographics ==
At the 2001 Indian Census, Bastipur had a population of approximately 10,000. Males constitute 55% of the population and females 45%. Bastipur has an average literacy rate of 70%, higher than the national average of 59.5%.

Hinduism is the religion of 90% of Bastipur's population, and Muslims make up most of the other 10%.

Hindi and Bhojpuri language are the principal spoken and written languages, with English and Urdu also used, but less frequently.

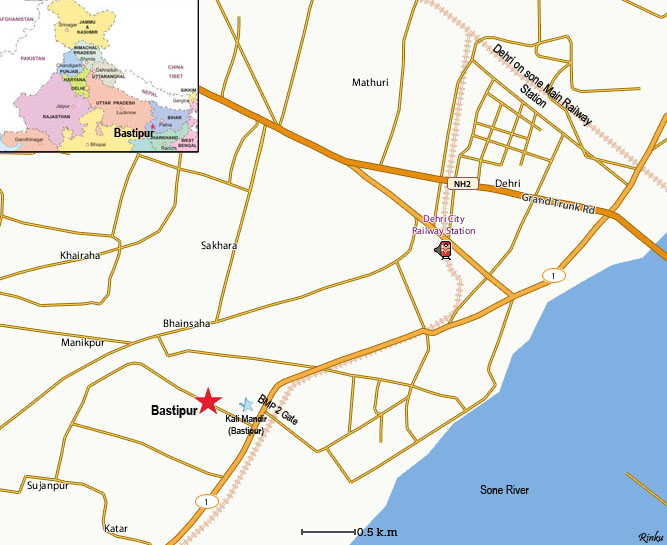
Map of Bastipur, Dehri, Bihar

== Culture ==
Religious festivals include Chhath, Diwali - the festival of lights, Durga Puja, Holi, Sankranti, Maha Shivaratri, Eid and Buddha Jayanti.

The Sankranti and Chhath fairs are famous in this region.

== Education ==
Bastipur has one government primary school, Bastipur Basic School, as well as one private primary school. For higher study, people can go to the nearby city of Dehri.

== History ==
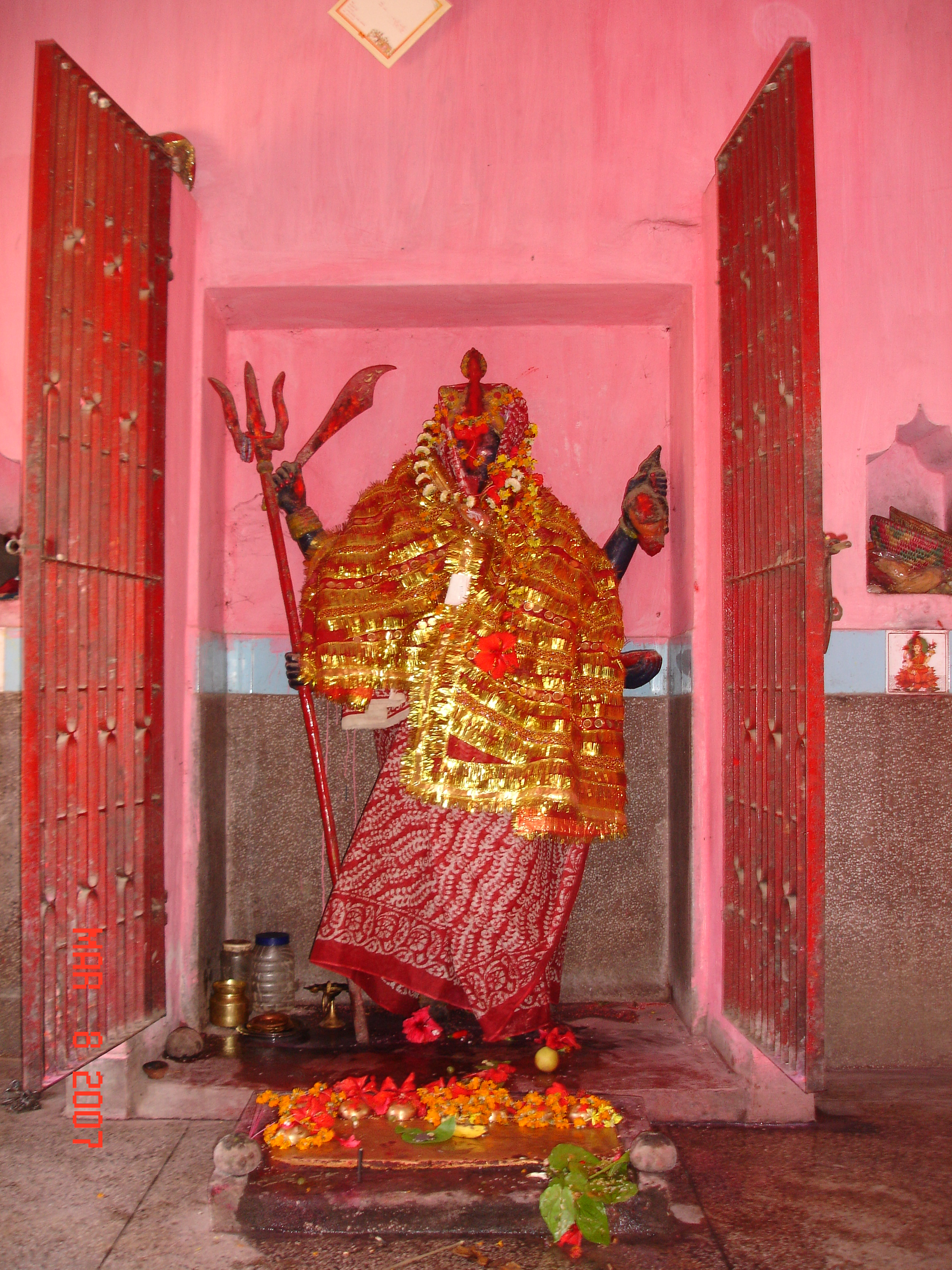
The Kali Mandir in Bastipur, Bihar

Bastipur was founded by the late Chander Singh. People of Bastipur initially migrated from Fatehpur Sikri, in Uttar Pradesh.

== Economy ==
Bastipur's main economy is based on agriculture, business and service, and the area is referred to as paddy land or as the rice bowl of Bihar.

== Places of interest ==
- Kali Mandir is one of the oldest temples in this region.
- Anicut is the oldest dam in India, built in 1869 by the British government. It is 1.5 km from the village.
- Indrapuri is a reservoir,3.9 km long and 45 m high, which is 9 km from Bastipur.
- Sasaram, the birthplace of Pashtun Emperor Sher Shah Suri, is 15 km from Bastipur.
- Rohtas Garh Kila was made by the son of Raja Harichandra, and is 20 km from Bastipur.
