= Bhoja Chak =

- Village
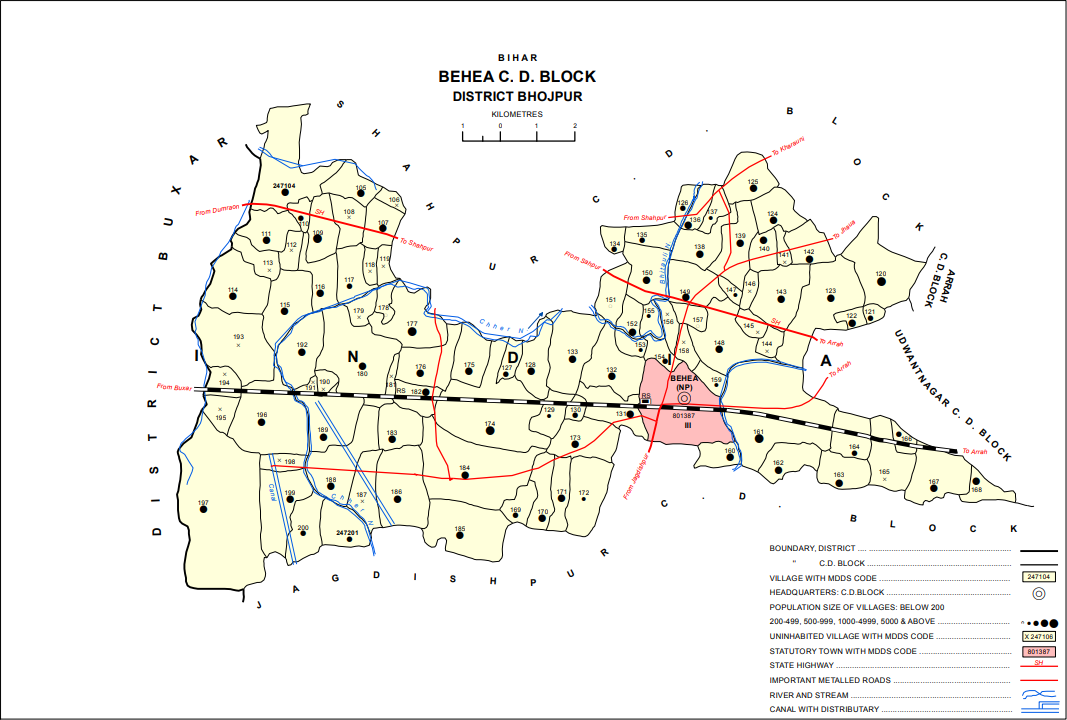
- Map of Bhoja Chak (#159) in Behea block

- Location in Bihar, India Bhoja Chak (India)
- Coordinates: 25.56589°N 84.4684°E
- Country: India
- State: Bihar
- District: Bhojpur

Area
  - Total: 0.043 km^{2} (0.017 sq mi)
- Elevation: 62 m (203 ft)

Population (2011)
  - Total: 316
  - Density: 7,300/km^{2} (19,000/sq mi)

Languages
  - Official: Bhojpuri, Hindi
- Time zone: UTC+5:30 (IST)

Bhoja Chak is a small village in Bihiya block of Bhojpur district in Bihar, India. As of 2011, its population was 316, in 57 households. It is located just northeast of the town of Bihiya.
