= Tiar, Bhojpur =

Tiar Tiār
- Village
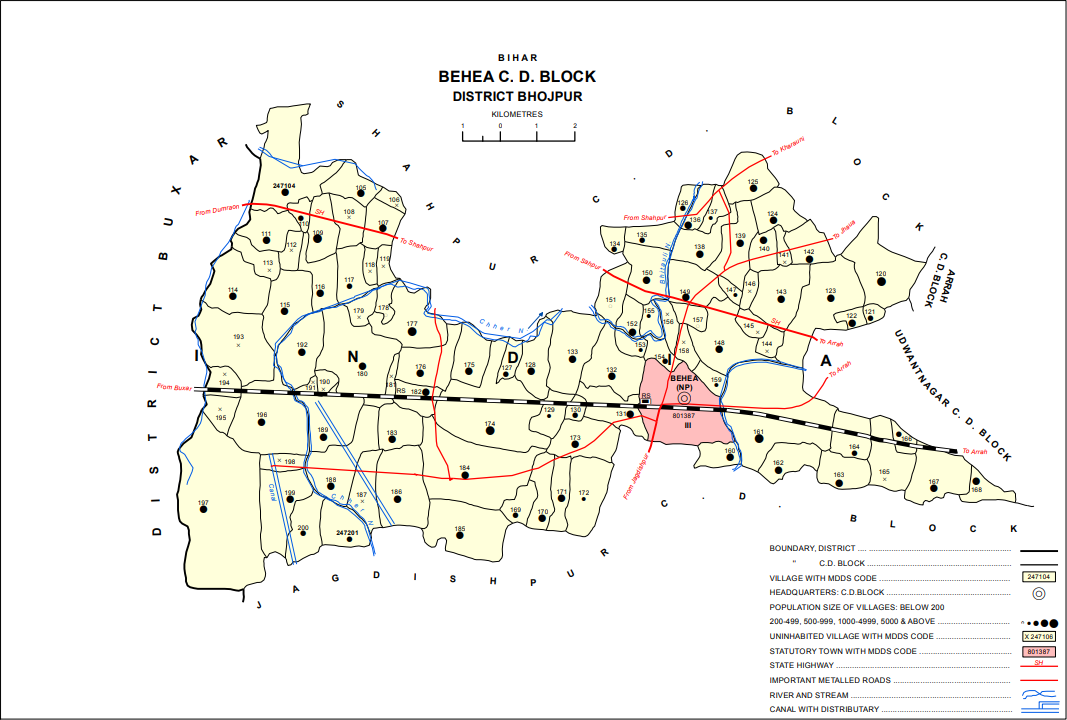
- Map of Tiar (#197) in Behea block

- Location in Bihar, India Tiar (India)
- Coordinates: 25.53186°N 84.34057°E
- Country: India
- State: Bihar
- District: Bhojpur

Area
  - Total: 0.841 km^{2} (0.325 sq mi)
- Elevation: 70 m (230 ft)

Population (2011)
  - Total: 4,338
  - Density: 5,160/km^{2} (13,400/sq mi)

Languages
  - Official: Bhojpuri, Hindi
- Time zone: UTC+5:30 (IST)

Tiar is a village in the southwestern corner of Bihiya block in Bhojpur district, Bihar, India. As of 2011, its population was 4,338, in 663 households.
