= Teghra, Bihiya =

Teghra
- Village
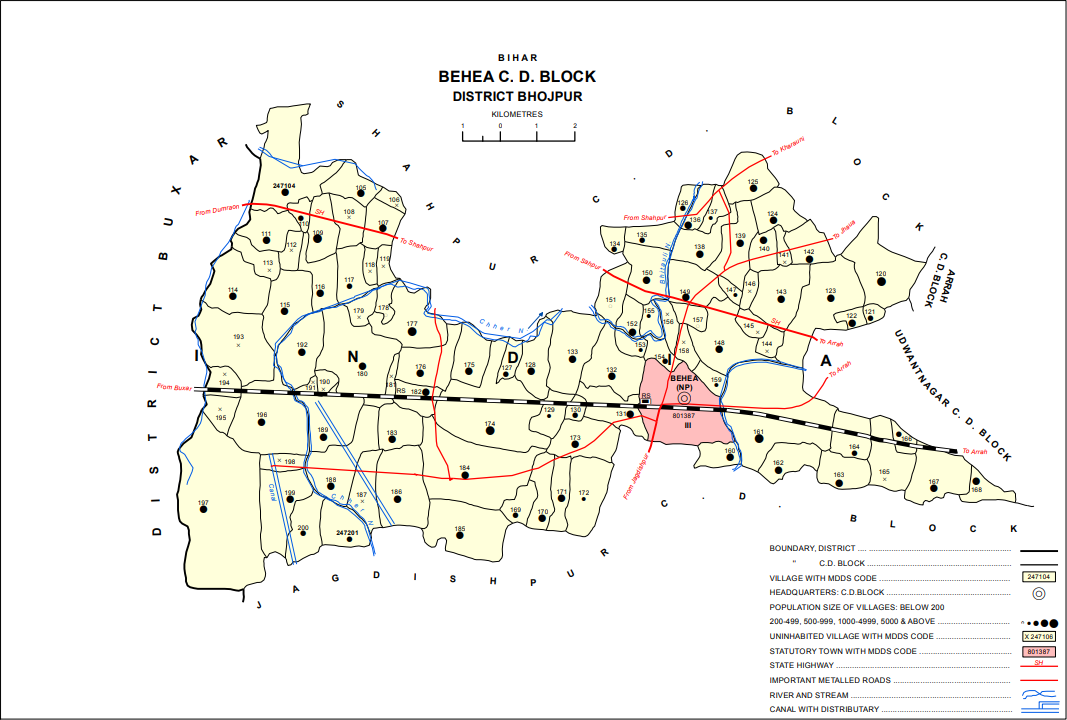
- Map of Teghra (#149) in Behea block

- Location in Bihar, India Teghra (India)
- Coordinates: 25.5908°N 84.46436°E
- Country: India
- State: Bihar
- District: Bhojpur

Area
  - Total: 0.130 km^{2} (0.050 sq mi)
- Elevation: 60 m (200 ft)

Population (2011)
  - Total: 3,049
  - Density: 23,500/km^{2} (60,700/sq mi)

Languages
  - Official: Bhojpuri, Hindi
- Time zone: UTC+5:30 (IST)

Teghra is a village in Bihiya block of Bhojpur district in Bihar, India. As of 2011, its population was 3,049, in 420 households. It is located northeast of Bihiya, at a crossroads, with one road running north–south from Jhaua to Jagdishpur and the other running east–west from Arrah to Shahpur.
