= Bihia Canal =

Canal in Bihar, India

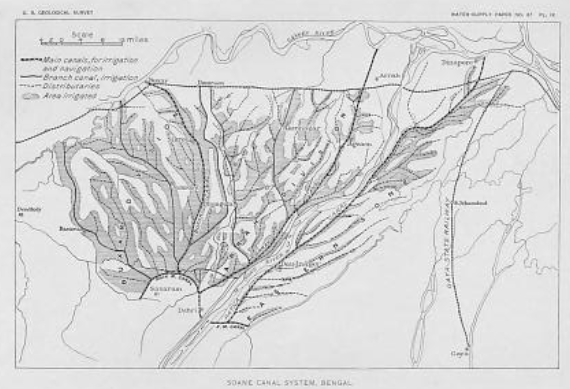
- A historical map of the Sone Canal System.
- Location: Behea
- Country: India

Specifications
- Length: 31 miles (50 km)
- Status: Functional

Geography
- Branch of: Arrah Canal

The Bihiya Canal (also spelled Bihiā Canal or Behea Canal) is a major irrigation channel in the Bhojpur district of the Indian state of Bihar. It is one of the principal distributaries of the Sone Canal System and plays a crucial role in the agriculture of the region.

== History and construction ==
The construction of the Canal was part of a major land development project undertaken during the British Raj. Following the Indian Rebellion of 1857, a large area of jungle that had been the confiscated property Kunwar Singh was granted to Messrs. Burrows, Thomson and Mylne, who established the Bihiā estate.

As part of their efforts to make the land cultivable, the new proprietors cleared the jungle and invested in infrastructure. The Bihiya Canal was constructed through the entire length of this newly developed land, transforming it into a cultivated and productive agricultural area.

== Course and specification ==
The Bihiya Canal branches off from the Arrah Canal, which is itself supplied by the Main Western Canal of the Sone River. It is one of the main offshoots of the Arrah Canal, alongside the Dumraon Canal. The Bihiya Canal runs for a total length of 31 miles (approximately 50 kilometers), distributing water for irrigation throughout its course.

== Purpose and impact ==
The purpose of the Bihiya Canal is irrigation. Its construction was instrumental in transforming the dense jungle of the former Bihiya estate into agricultural land, thereby supporting the local economy and settlement in the region. Along with a network of other distributaries from the Sone, it forms the backbone of the irrigation system in the plains of the Bhojpur district.
