= Jamua, Bihiya =

Jamua
- Village
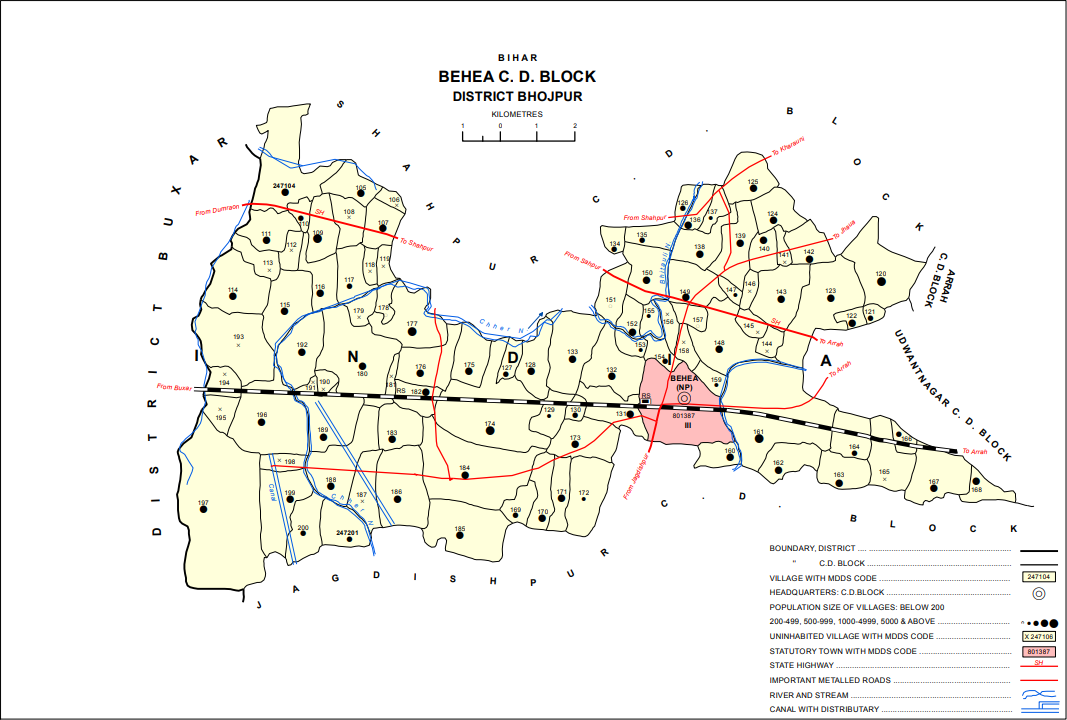
- Map of Jamua (#132) in Behea block

- Location in Bihar, India Jamua (India)
- Coordinates: 25.57464°N 84.44179°E
- Country: India
- State: Bihar
- District: Bhojpur

Area
  - Total: 0.176 km^{2} (0.068 sq mi)
- Elevation: 64 m (210 ft)

Population (2011)
  - Total: 2,308
  - Density: 13,100/km^{2} (34,000/sq mi)

Languages
  - Official: Bhojpuri, Hindi
- Time zone: UTC+5:30 (IST)

Jamua is a village in the Bihiya block of Bhojpur district in Bihar, India. As of 2011, its population was 2,308, in 306 households. It is located just northwest of the town of Bihiya.
