= Khakhu Bandh =

Khakhu Bandh Khākhu Bāndh
- Village
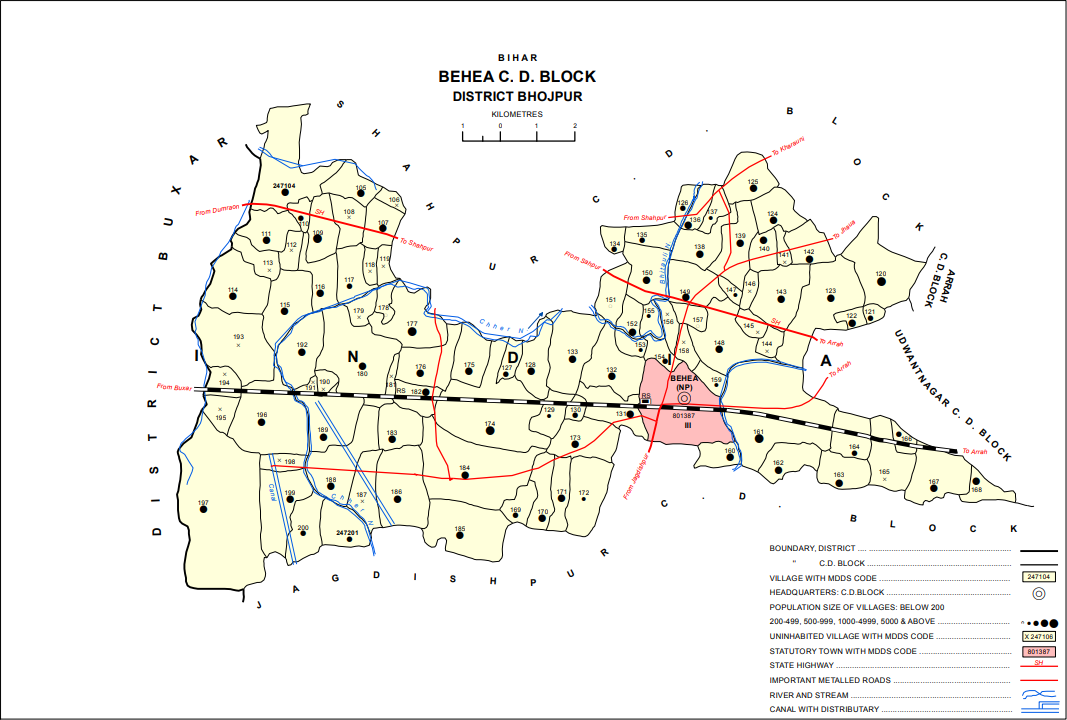
- Map of Khakhu Bandh (#172) in Behea block

- Location in Bihar, India Khakhu Bandh (India)
- Coordinates: 25.54363°N 84.43483°E
- Country: India
- State: Bihar
- District: Bhojpur

Area
  - Total: 0.202 km^{2} (0.078 sq mi)
- Elevation: 64 m (210 ft)

Population (2011)
  - Total: 426
  - Density: 2,110/km^{2} (5,460/sq mi)

Languages
  - Official: Bhojpuri, Hindi
- Time zone: UTC+5:30 (IST)

Khakhu Bandh is a small village in the southern part of Bihiya block in Bhojpur district, Bihar, India. As of 2011, its population was 426, in 56 households.
