= Arrah Canal =

Canal in Bihar, India

Arrah Canal 𑂄𑂩𑂰 𑂍𑂵 𑂢𑂯𑂩
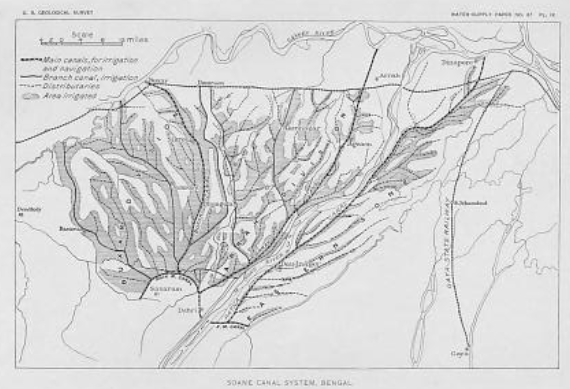
- A historical map of the Sone Canal System. The course of the Arrah Canal is visible running north from the Main Western Canal, past the city of Arrah, towards the Ganges River.
- Location: Arrah
- Country: India

Specifications
- Length: 60 miles (97 km)
- Locks: 13
- Status: Functional

History
- Other engineer: W.A.Inglis
- Construction began: 1868
- Date completed: 1873

Geography
- Branch of: Western Main Canal
- Connects to: Gangi River

The Arrah Canal is a major canal of the Sone Canal System, located in the Bhojpur district (formerly Shahabad district) of Bihar, India.At the time of its construction, the region was part of the Bengal Presidency. Constructed in the early 20th century as a distributary of the Western Main Canal, it was designed to irrigate nearly 150,000 acres of agricultural land for both the Kharif and Rabi seasons. Today, it is a key component of what is known as the Sone Low Level Canal System and receives its water from the Indrapuri Barrage.

== History and construction ==
The concept for the Sone Canal System originated in 1853 with a proposal by Colonel C. H. Dickens. After significant delays caused by the Indian Rebellion of 1857, the project was initially undertaken by the East India Irrigation and Canal Company before being purchased by the government in 1868. Construction commenced the following year, and by 1873, the system was operational enough to supply water to the Arrah Canal and other channels to provide drought relief. The canal began regular, rated water supply for irrigation from the 1876–77 season. An early report names W.A. Inglis as the executive engineer of the Arrah Canal during this period.

According to a report from January 1875, the revised cost estimate for the Arrah Canal was £219,086. Early construction costs for the canal were recorded at £3,285 and 14 shillings per mile, exclusive of tools and plant. The Arrah Canal was developed as part of the British-era Sone Project. Major construction on the canal was completed by 1905. A detailed statement of expenditure from the period shows the total cost of construction was Rs. 7,21,039. The largest portions of this expenditure were for earth-work (Rs. 3,12,837), works (Rs. 1,96,530), and land acquisition (Rs. 1,23,553).

== Design and features ==
The Arrah Canal was engineered for both irrigation and navigation. It originates from the Main Western Canal at the fifth mile, taking off a designed discharge of 1,616 cubic feet of water per second. The Main Western Canal, from which the Arrah Canal branches, navigated the local topography through significant engineering works, including a large syphon aqueduct to cross the Kao Torrent.

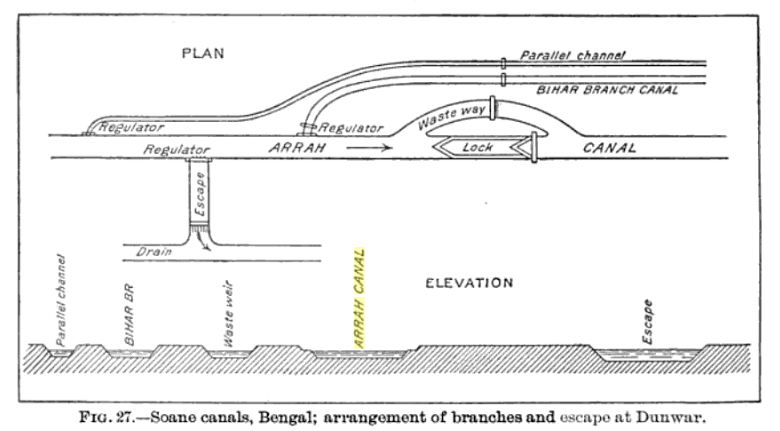
This structure is an example of the significant masonry works required to carry the canal system over natural streams and torrents in the region.

The canal is sixty miles long, following a course that initially curves towards the Son River before turning north to pass the city of Arrah. It ultimately terminates in the Gangi River, through which its waters connect to the Ganges. To manage the 180-foot fall in elevation over its length, a system of thirteen locks was constructed,one of which was later abandoned, two of which are double locks. While the canal was designed for navigation, its utility was limited as the Gangi River connection to the Ganges was often impassable due to shoals, especially outside of the flood season.

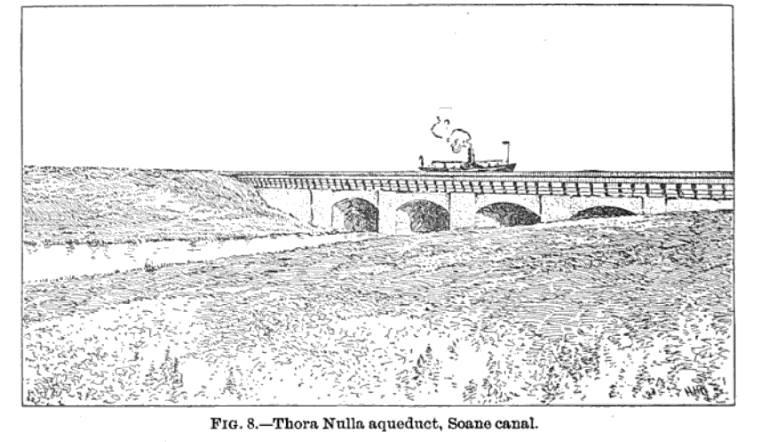
A technical diagram from a historical engineering report showing the typical arrangement of a branch canal off-take on the Sone canals

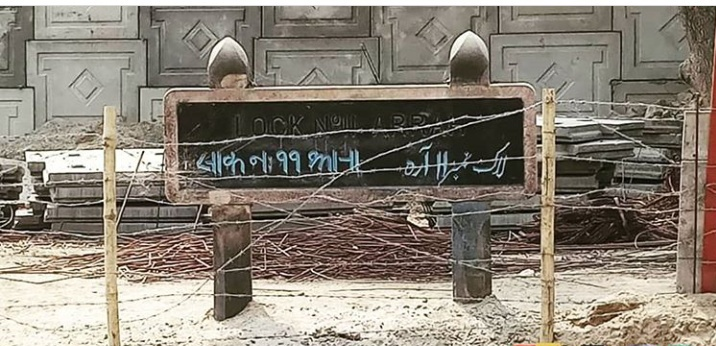
A historical marker for Lock No. 11 on the Arrah Canal. The canal system was originally constructed with thirteen locks to navigate the 180-foot drop in elevation along its course.

The width of the canal was designed to narrow as its course progressed and its water was distributed. For the first fifteen miles from its origin at Dehri, the canal was built to be 86 feet wide at the base. This was reduced to 57 feet at the twenty-sixth mile and further narrowed to 47 feet at the thirty-second mile.

The engineering of the canal also included advanced water control systems for its time. On at least one of the weirs of the Arrah Canal, a movable dam was constructed based on a system developed by French engineer M. Chanoine. Furthermore, the canal was designed to serve a dual purpose as a flood control measure, with its structure acting as an embankment against the Son River on its western bank.

The canal was actively used for navigation, with contemporary accounts noting "numerous canal boats loaded with grain or stone" traveling towards the Ganges, destined for Calcutta. The boats used were described as being 15 to 25 feet long and about 10 feet wide. Lacking sails, these boats were propelled by teams of men, sometimes ten or more, pulling them along the towpaths.

To facilitate local transport across the canal, a network of crossings was built. Important roads were served by "well-constructed masonry or iron bridges." However, a structural issue was reported with many of the masonry bridges, where pressure from the earth embankments caused the abutments to crack. For smaller roads and footpaths, "catamaran-shaped ferryboats" were used to shuttle people and goods across the water.

== Irrigation and impact ==
The canal was a key piece of irrigation infrastructure for the Shahabad district. According to a 1905-1906 comparative statement, the Arrah Canal commanded a culturable area of 177,400 acres. In that year, it irrigated a total of 107,655 acres, with 61,211 acres being for Kharif crops and 46,444 acres for Rabi crops. The revenue from assessed water-rates for that year was Rs. 2,58,516.

While the canal was a key asset, initial economic forecasts for the Sone Canal system were overly optimistic. An 1875 estimate anticipated net profits of over Rs. 26 lakh from more than 1 million irrigated acres. However, these projections were "falsified" as the water supply from the Son River was less than expected. The maximum area irrigated by the system in a single year was recorded as 557,494 acres in 1901-02.

=== Water duty and efficiency ===
Historical data from the early 1900s provides insight into the canal's technical efficiency, measured in terms of water duty—the area of crop matured by a certain volume of water.

For the Kharif season of 1901 (defined as July to October), the Arrah Canal had an average utilized discharge of 1,197 cubic feet per second over 122 days of flow. The duty for this period was calculated at 82 acres irrigated per cubic foot per second, with an equivalent water depth of 35 inches on the fields.

Data for the Rabi season shows the duty of the Arrah Canal over a three-year period:

- 1899–1900: 85 acres per cusec
- 1900–01: 112 acres per cusec
- 1901–02: 114 acres per cusec

This demonstrates a notable improvement in the canal's irrigation efficiency during the Rabi season over this period.

The impact of the Sone canal system was considered vital for the region. An 1875 report stated, "There can be little doubt that these canals have conferred upon Sháhábád an entire immunity from future famines." The canal, however, was also vulnerable to the river's power. It was breached during a "disastrous" flood in July 1876 and again during another major flood on September 5th, 1901, when its banks broke in several places. On the latter occasion, the floodwaters "poured into many parts of Arrah, destroying some of the small hamlets on its outskirts" and inundated large tracts of land." and inundated large tracts of land between the Son River and the railway line.

== Water management and modern context ==
As a main canal of the Sone Canal System, the management and water supply of the Arrah Canal have evolved significantly since its construction.

=== The satta system of water distribution ===
From its inception, water distribution was managed under the Bengal Irrigation Act of 1876 through a system of formal requests known as satta. Farmers submitted applications to receive a sanctioned water supply, which was then managed at the village level by an official called a sattadar. This system of management, which governed the Arrah Canal for nearly a century, was abandoned in 1974 due to growing demand and administrative challenges, before being reintroduced in a modified form in 1988.

=== Modern headworks and water sharing ===
The original headworks at the Dehri anicut, which first supplied the canal, was decommissioned in the 1960s. Today, the Arrah Canal receives its water from the modern Indrapuri Barrage, located 10 km upstream from the old site. The total volume of water available to the entire system, including the Arrah Canal, is now governed by the Bansagar Agreement of 1973, an inter-state agreement regulating water allocation from the Son River.

=== Performance and modern challenges ===
The Arrah Canal is now officially part of what is known as the Sone Low Level Canal System. As an aging, unlined channel, it faces significant problems. A 2021 technical study by researchers at NIT Patna specifically on the Arrah Canal found that its effective irrigation capacity had reduced from its original design of 161 m³/s to 119 m³/s.

The study measured the water loss due to seepage, finding that in some unlined sections, 2.2% to 8.35% of the canal's inflow was being lost. The research concluded by recommending that high-loss reaches be lined to improve water conveyance efficiency.
