= Jamuhar =

Jamuhar is a village in the Rohtas district of Bihar, India.

== History ==
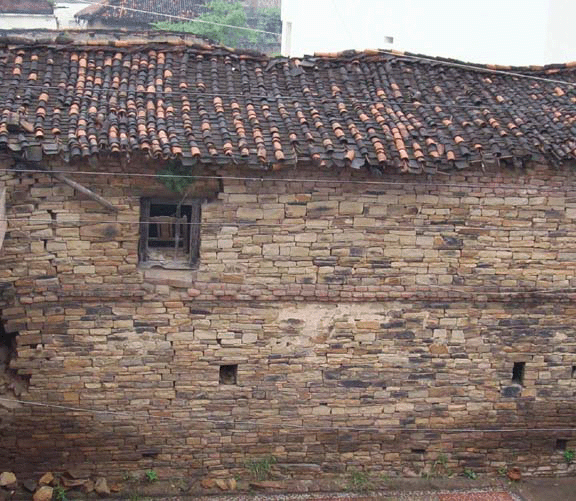
The part of old house of Jamuhar.

Loha Singh and Tara Singh left Fatehpur Sikri in the period of the Mughal emperor Aurangzeb. They were Sikarwar (Sikriwal) Rajputs. They came with their family and followers to the banks of Kai (Cow) River in Shahabad district 9 kilometres (5.6 mi) east of Sasaram in a forest near the Kaimur Hills. They inhabited the village Jamuhar with the help of their family and followers.

== Geography and climate ==
Jamuhar is very fertile flat land. It is drained by the Kai (Cow) river originating in the Kaimur Hills Valley.

Jamuhar is mildly cold in the winter (the lowest temperatures being around 5 to 10 °C (41 to 50 °F). Winter months are December and January. It is hot in the summer (with average highs around 35 to 40 °C (95 to 104 °F). April to mid June are the hot months. The monsoon months of June, July, August, and September see good rainfall. October & November and February & March have pleasant climate.

=== Villages in Jamuhar Panchayat ===
Villages within the Jamuhar panchayat include

- Chormara
- Mahdewa
- Jamuhar (and Gopi Bigha)
- Rudarpura
- Tendua Dusadhi

== Demographics ==
=== Population ===
Jamuhar has 491 households with a total of 3916 residents.

=== Education ===
Jamuhar is served by the Kanya Madhya Vidyalaya middle school and the Jamuhar High School, and is home to several institutions of higher learning:

- The Narayan Medical College and Hospital (NCMH).
- The Institute of Professional Studies (a computer skills training school)
- High School, Jamuhar
- Middle School, Jamuhar
- Gyan Niketan convent school

== Religion ==
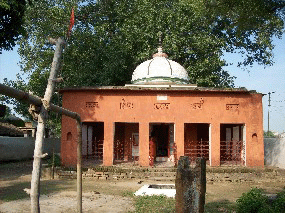
The Temple of Kali Ma in the east of Village Jamuhar.

=== Chhath ===
The celebration of Chhath is a major event of the Jamuhar religious calendar.

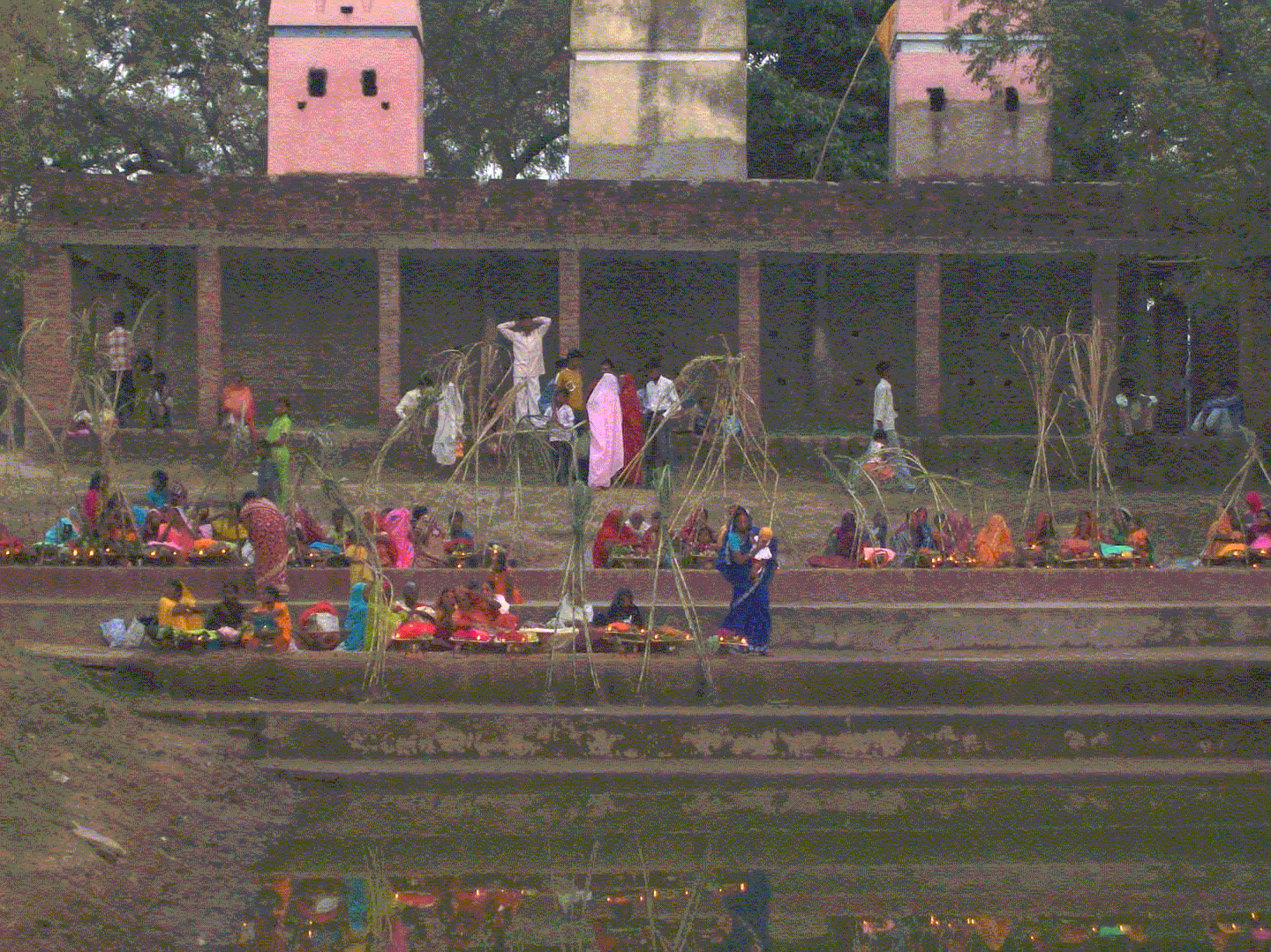
Chhath Festival at pond Sati Mai Talab of Village Jamuhar.

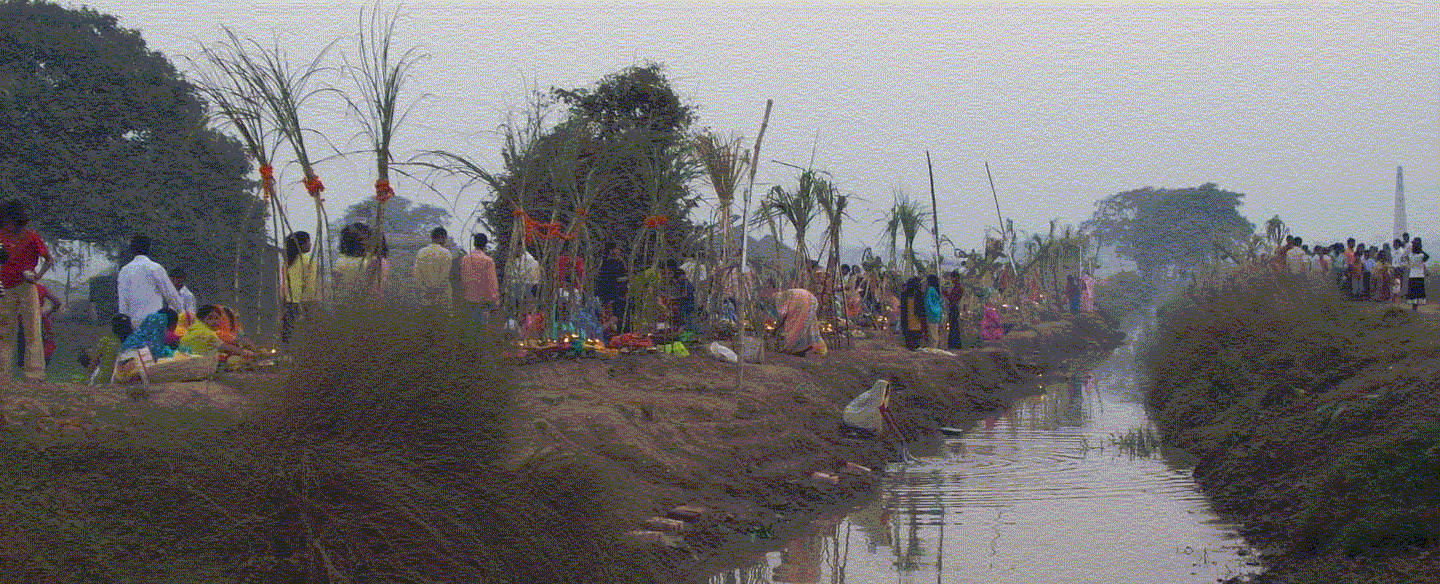
Chhath Festival at Bank of canal of Kai River of Village Jamuhar.

The Chhath Pooja in Jamuhar is celebrated on the bank of Canal of Kai River and other Ponds (Talabs).

=== Places of worship ===
The temple of Lord Shiva was made by all villagers. There is an old Shiv Ling (Budhwa Shiv Ji) also in the temple compound. The Kali Mandir is very old. There are many temples in the village.

The Masjid of Jamuhar named "Makkah Madinih Masjid" is under construction.
