= Katira, Arrah =

Town in Bhojpur district of Bihar, India

Katira (historic spelling: Kuttereea) is a neighbourhood in the town of Arrah in the Bhojpur district of Bihar, India. It is situated almost five miles from the town of Piro.

== History ==
The village is mentioned in an 1873 report by J. H. Thornton, the Civil Surgeon of Shahabad, in the context of a major cholera epidemic that affected the region.

During a visit to Piro (spelled as Peeroo) in May 1873, the Civil Surgeon found that while Piro itself was healthy, Katira had been severely impacted by the outbreak. According to the report, there had been 34 cases of cholera and 19 deaths in the village. At the time, the sanitary condition of the village was noted as being "very dirty". As part of the public health response, the Civil Surgeon advised that the village should be cleaned and that sulphur fires should be burned, a common disinfectant measure of the era.

== Notable people ==
- Mithileshwar, Hindi Author
