= Dehri =

Dehri Dehri-On-Sone
- Urban Area
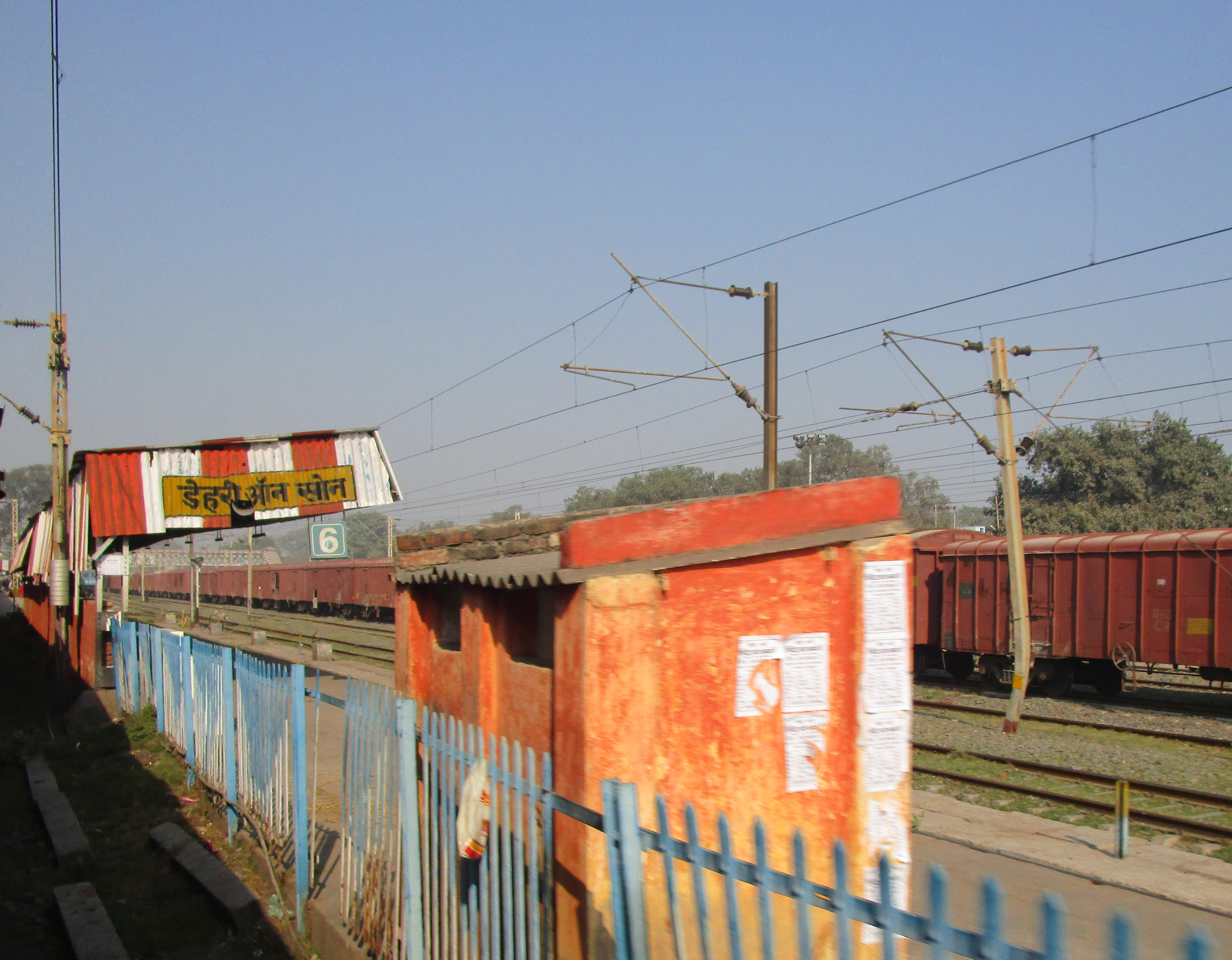
- Indrapuri Barrage at Dehri On Sone, Dehri Junction

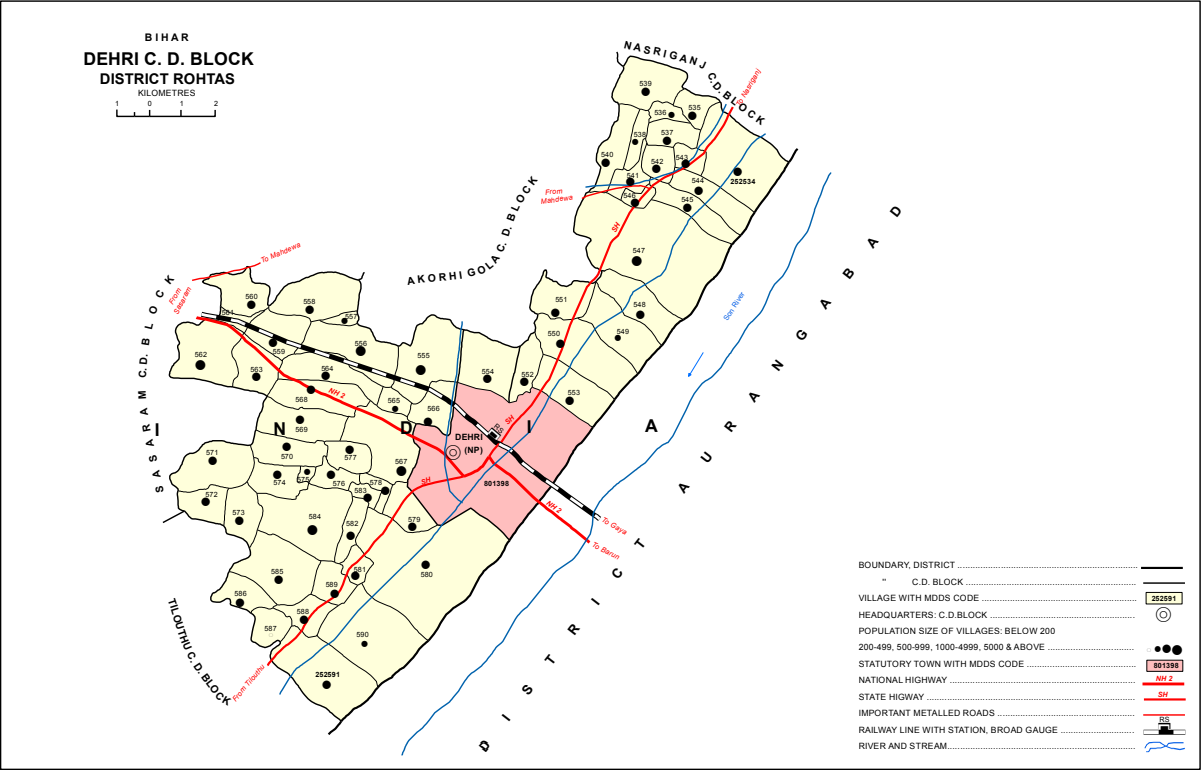

- Location in Bihar, India Dehri (India)
- Coordinates: 24.91°N 84.18°E
- Country: India
- State: Bihar
- District: Rohtas

Government
  - Type: Municipality
  - Body: Dehri Urban Development Authority (DUDA)
- Elevation: 52 m (171 ft)

Population (2011)
  - Total: 137,231

Languages
  - Official: Hindi
  - Others: Bhojpuri
- Time zone: UTC+5:30 (IST)
- PIN: 821305,821307
- Vehicle registration: BR-24
- Railway Station: Dehri-on-Sone Junction
- Website: rohtas.nic.in

Dehri (also spelled as Dehree) also known as Dehri-on-Sone is a Nagar parishad and corresponding community development block in Rohtas district in the state of Bihar, India. Situated on the banks of Sone River, Dehri is a railway hub, and is adjoining Dalmianagar that used to be an industrial town.

== Etymology ==
The name Dehri-on-Sone is based on the Sone River. The city is situated at the banks of the Sone River.

== Demographics ==
Historical population
Year	Pop.	±%
1941	8,281	—
1951	24,406	+194.7%
1961	38,092	+56.1%
1971	46,037	+20.9%
1981	90,409	+96.4%
1991	93,594	+3.5%
2001	119,057	+27.2%
2011	137,231	+15.3%
Source: 2011 Census of India

As of 2011, its population was 137,231, in 23,234 households. Dehri is home to the Indrapuri Barrage, the fourth-longest barrage in the world.

Males were 72,372 and females 64,859. The average literacy rate was 81.2%, higher than the national average of 74%. Male literacy was 87.54% and female literacy 74.08%. The population of children in age group 0–6 years was 19,010, of which boys were 9,886 and girls 9,124.

== Economy ==
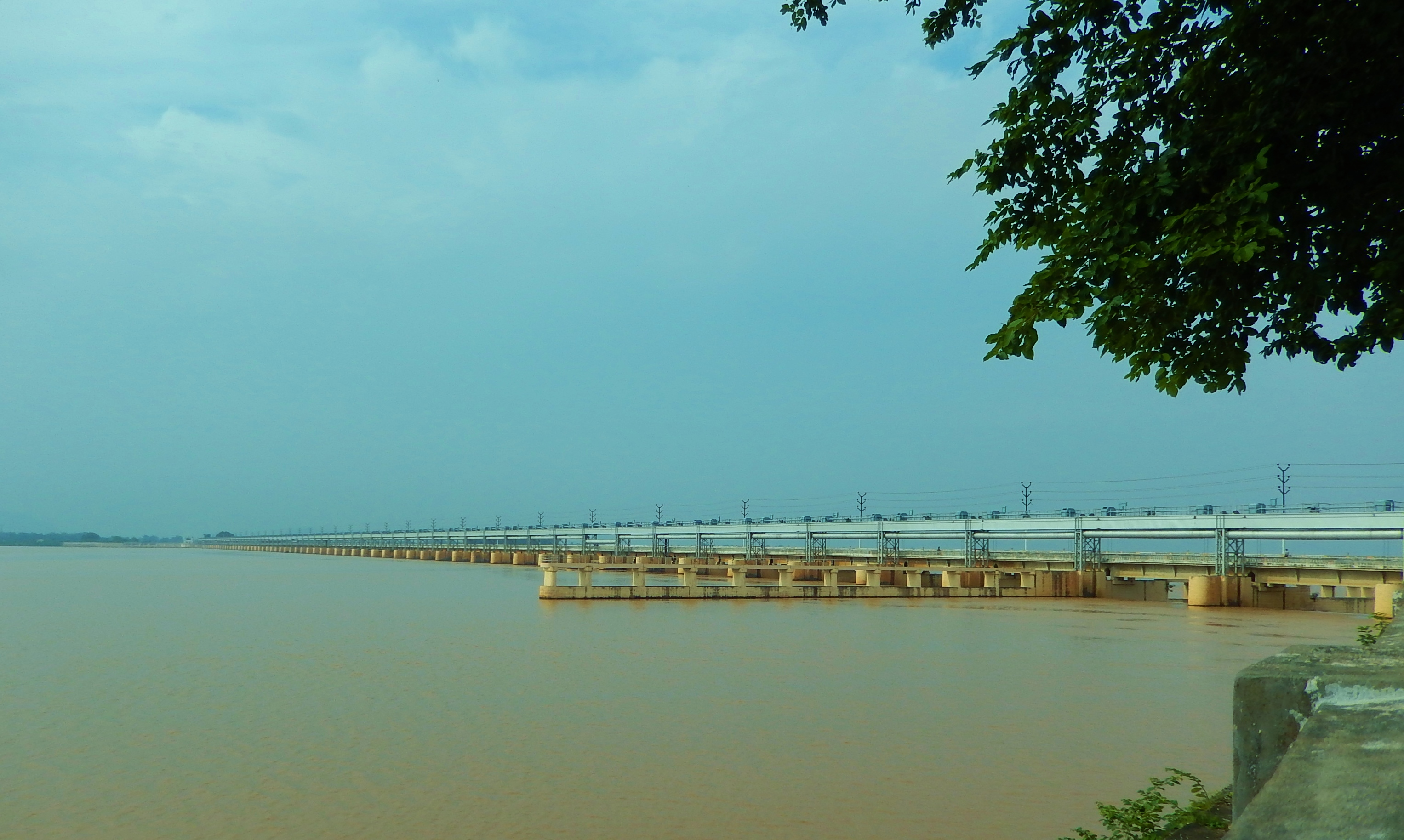
The Indrapuri Dam, near Dehri.

Important industries in Dehri include sawmilling and ghee processing. Other important commodities include plastic pipes, light bulbs, and shoes.

The headworks of the Sone canal system is located in Dehri.

== Recreation ==
Dehri is home to a stadium, two cinemas four auditoriums, and three public libraries.

== Transportation ==
Dehri-on-Sone railway station (station code: DOS) is on the Gaya–Pandit Deen Dayal Upadhyaya Junction section of the Grand Chord line. It is the major railway station of Dehri.

Dehri is located on major road Delhi Kolkata Highway, which connects to the major cities of India.

== Climate ==
Climate data for Dehri (1991–2020, extremes 1901–2020)
Month	Jan	Feb	Mar	Apr	May	Jun	Jul	Aug	Sep	Oct	Nov	Dec	Year
Record high °C (°F)	31.0 (87.8)	36.0 (96.8)	41.5 (106.7)	45.3 (113.5)	49.5 (121.1)	47.2 (117.0)	44.5 (112.1)	39.4 (102.9)	37.1 (98.8)	39.7 (103.5)	35.1 (95.2)	31.7 (89.1)	49.5 (121.1)
Mean daily maximum °C (°F)	22.4 (72.3)	26.4 (79.5)	33.0 (91.4)	38.9 (102.0)	40.5 (104.9)	38.0 (100.4)	33.6 (92.5)	32.8 (91.0)	32.4 (90.3)	31.5 (88.7)	28.9 (84.0)	24.6 (76.3)	32.1 (89.8)
Mean daily minimum °C (°F)	8.5 (47.3)	11.4 (52.5)	15.6 (60.1)	21.3 (70.3)	23.8 (74.8)	24.7 (76.5)	24.9 (76.8)	24.7 (76.5)	23.9 (75.0)	20.3 (68.5)	13.5 (56.3)	9.7 (49.5)	18.6 (65.5)
Record low °C (°F)	−1.0 (30.2)	0.0 (32.0)	1.5 (34.7)	3.0 (37.4)	5.0 (41.0)	13.5 (56.3)	11.4 (52.5)	11.0 (51.8)	10.8 (51.4)	4.0 (39.2)	0.0 (32.0)	0.0 (32.0)	−1.0 (30.2)
Average rainfall mm (inches)	11.1 (0.44)	17.4 (0.69)	9.6 (0.38)	10.2 (0.40)	35.4 (1.39)	132.9 (5.23)	316.2 (12.45)	297.8 (11.72)	190.4 (7.50)	43.7 (1.72)	1.7 (0.07)	3.5 (0.14)	1,070.1 (42.13)
Average rainy days	1.0	1.4	1.1	1.0	2.5	6.7	13.4	13.2	9.0	2.2	0.2	0.4	52.1
Average relative humidity (%) (at 17:30 IST)	66	60	44	32	37	56	74	79	81	74	65	64	61
Source: India Meteorological Department

== Villages ==
The CD block of Dehri contains 58 rural villages, all of which are inhabited:

Village name	Total land area (hectares)	Population (in 2011)
Panruhar	557	1,803
Gohi	123	1,353
Gonuwan	69	720
Maudiha	136	1,727
Shiwpur	78	590
Barawan	279	4,521
Ahirawan	176	1,942
Khudrawan	120	1,439
Chilbila	97	1,380
Parsawan	55	1,307
Tanrwa	210	1,177
Majhiawan	195	1,839
Ayar Kotha	53	1,138
Darihat	1,123	11,953
Bhusahula	291	2,953
Chainpur	311	876
Berkap	454	2,893
Bharkunria	184	1,885
Ahibaranpur	121	2,065
Hurka	320	1,982
Sidhauli	22	2,320
Gangauli	447	5,279
Pahleza	338	6,464
Shiupur	59	932
Deuria	284	2,939
Tendua Dusadhi	239	2,660
Mahdewa	175	1,298
Chormara	74	25
Jamuhar	368	6,228
Rudarpura	210	1,121
Chakia	264	2,362
Manaura	70	625
Mathuri	180	3,581
Sakhara	405	5,820
Suara	267	2,584
Dahaur	276	2,802
Patpura	219	1,617
Bharkunria	320	1,737
Guraila	146	1,933
Durgapur	170	1,461
Bhatauli	162	1,558
Wojhaulia	19	731
Ghonghaha	96	1,865
Khairaha	135	1,853
Bhainsaha	64	2,833
Bastipur	451	2,159
Katar	853	3,368
Bardiha	94	1,477
Sujanpur	109	1,750
Manikpur	53	1,814
Bhaluari	475	6,821
Nawadih	422	4,000
Dudhmi	134	1,705
Shahpur	103	89
Chaknaha	155	1,831
Shankarpur	120	2,056
Sikaria	619	559
Patanawa	528	1,983
Garwat Bigha	60	805
