= Behea, Bihar =

Behea Bihiya
- town
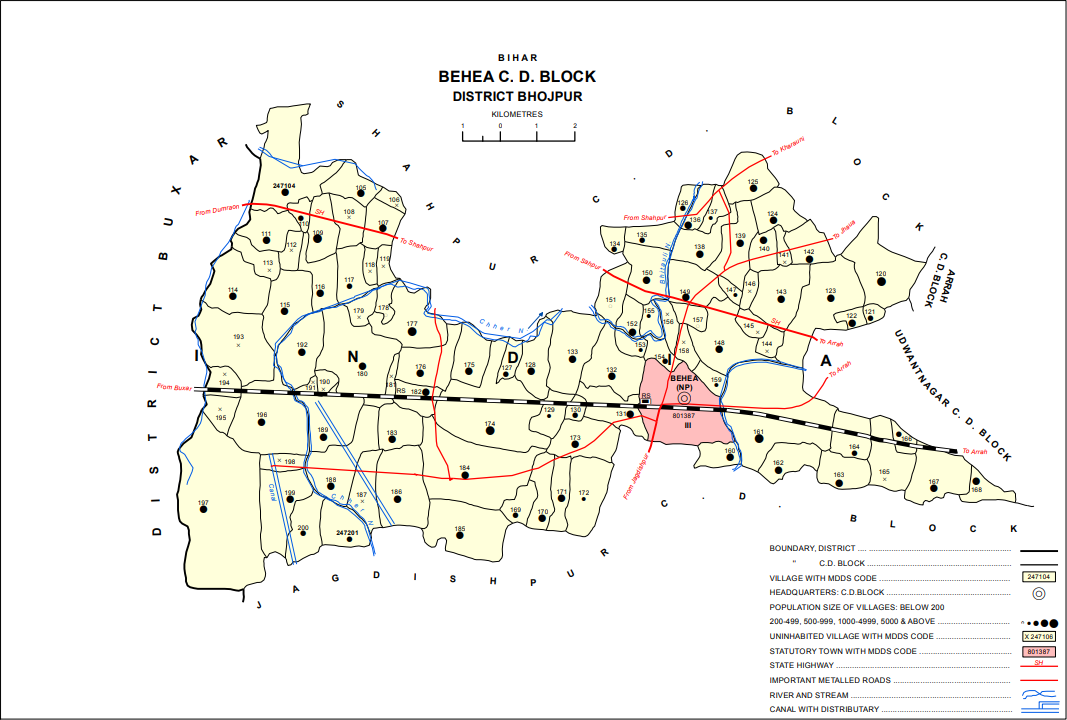
- Location in Behea block

- Location in Bihar, India Behea (India)
- Coordinates: 25.5607°N 84.45935°E
- Country: India
- State: Bihar
- District: Bhojpur

Area
  - Total: 100 km^{2} (39 sq mi)

Population (2011)
  - Total: 26,707
  - Density: 270/km^{2} (690/sq mi)

Languages
  - Official: Bhojpuri, Hindi
- Time zone: UTC+5:30 (IST)
- PIN: 802152
- Sex ratio: 58-42 ♂/♀
- Website: bhojpur.bih.nic.in

Behea or Bihiya (historically spelled in British sources as Bihiā or Beheea) is a nagar panchayat town and block in Bhojpur district in the Indian state of Bihar. Historically, it was a seat of the Harihoban Rajputs and later, in the colonial era, became the headquarters of the influential Bihiā Estate. The town is particularly notable for the 19th-century invention of the Bihiā Mill, a bullock-powered sugar mill that became widely adopted.

== History ==
=== Early history ===
Historically, Bihiya was an early seat of power for the Chero tribe, who are said to have had a palace in the area. The Cheros were later displaced by the Harihoban Rajputs. After migrating from the Central Provinces and then the Saran district, the Harihobans settled in Bihiya and, after a conflict lasting over a century, established it as their chief seat. Remains of their ancestral fort are reportedly still present.

According to tradition, in 1528, the scion of the Bihiya Harihobans, whose name is given as either Ram Pal Singh or Bhopat Deo, raped a local Brahmin woman named Mathin or Mahini, in line with the custom of "taking of dola", which allowed the local Rajput lord to sleep with a lower-caste woman on her wedding night. Mathin then committed suicide, but not before laying a curse upon the Harihobans, who eventually left Bihiya and moved to Ballia across the Ganges. A temple called the Mathin Dai was built in Bihiya in her memory.

=== Colonial era ===
After the revolt of 1857, the trajectory of the area was transformed. The lands around the town, which were part of the confiscated property of the Kunwar Singh, were consolidated by the British government into the Bihiā estate. As a reward for their services, this estate was settled for 50 years with Messrs. Burrows, Thomson and Mylne.

The new proprietors undertook significant development. The surrounding jungle, which had served as a refuge for rebels, was systematically cleared. The estate started the construction of the Bihia Canal, a 31-mile-long offshoot of the Arrah Canal that irrigated the area.

Bihiya was first listed as a nagar panchayat town in the 1980s.

== Demographics ==
Historical population
Year	Pop.	±%
1971	8,253	—
1981	11,602	+40.6%
1991	17,082	+47.2%
2001	20,741	+21.4%
2011	26,707	+28.8%
Source: 2011 Census of India

As of the 2001 census, the population was approximately 25,000, of which 17% were below age 6. The population was primarily a mix of Hindus and Muslims, and the primary spoken language was Bhojpuri. 59% of the population was reported to be literate, including 41% among females.

The population of Bihiya sub-district in 2001 was 139,374; this increased to 151,722 by 2011. Likewise, the population of the town of Bihiya itself increased by 28.8%, from 20,741 in 2001 to 26,707 in 2011. The district overall had a sex ratio of 918 in 2011 (917 in rural areas, and 920 in the town of Bihiya itself). In the 0-6 age group, the ratio was higher: 923 in rural areas, 964 in the town of Bihiya, and 928 overall. Members of scheduled castes formed 16.65% of the sub-district's total population, and 9.09% of the population of the town of Bihiya. Likewise, members of scheduled tribes constituted 1.39% of the total population of the sub-district, and 3.21% of the population of the town of Bihiya. The 3.21% of scheduled tribe members in the town of Bihiya was the highest percentage of towns in Bhojpur district in 2011. The literacy rate of the sub-district as a whole was 67.8% in 2011 (69.4% in rural areas, and 78.2% in the town of Bihiya itself).

25.66% of the population of Bihiya sub-district, and 24.31% of the population of the town of Bihiya, was engaged in main or marginal work in 2011; both figures were the lowest in Bhojpur district for sub-districts and towns respectively. A plurality of workers in Bihiya sub-district were agricultural labourers who did not own or rent their own land (instead, they work on another person's land for wages), accounting for 40.79% of the workforce. Cultivators who did own or lease their own land constituted 25.05% of the sub-district's workforce, household industry workers were 4.10%, and other workers were the remaining 29.24%. These figures were all fairly close to the average for the entire district of Bhojpur. Patterns of employment were different in the town of Bihiya, where both categories of agricultural workers combined formed less than 20% of the workforce. Other workers were 70.49%, compared to the 72.55% average for all towns in Bhojpur.

== Transport ==
Behea is served by a railway station and bus stop.

== Economy ==
=== Bihiā mills ===
In the late 19th century, the town became best known for an important agricultural invention: the iron roller sugar mill. Invented in 1874 by Messrs. Thomson and Mylne of the Bihiā Estate, these bullock-powered mills were a significant improvement over the crude machines then in use. The "Bihiā mills" became immensely popular across the region, establishing the town as a center of local industry and innovation.

The main occupations are agriculture and commerce. Behea is in a fertile agricultural area where the main crops are wheat and rice. Farmers are independent land owners who raise their own cattle and crops. A small number of Zamindars (landlords) rent their farms to others. The main water source for irrigation is a tributary of the Ganga river.

Of the total land area in Bihiya sub-district, 71.92% is under cultivation; of the cultivated area, 63.91% is irrigated.

Small-scale industries include an asbestos factory and brick-making.

Behea is a business hub for small-scale traders, who mainly collect agricultural products from farmers to sell elsewhere. Power shortages constrict Behea's economic potential.

The commercial district is the Raja Bazaar on Station Road, which includes shopping complexes such as the Jagdamba Market. Jewelry shops dominate the district.

According to the 2011 Census of India, the main three commodities manufactured in the town of Bihiya are bamboo products, brooms, and biscuits.

== List of villages ==
Apart from the town of Bihiya, the block of Bihiya comprises the following 98 villages, of which 76 are inhabited and 22 are uninhabited: (GP = Gram Panchayat)

Village name	Total land area (hectares)	Population (in 2011)
Amiya	46	804
Amrai	342	2,033
Andar	219	1,790
Andauli	50	253
Bagahin	96	4,653
Banahin	348	1,841
Bandha	79	2,287
Bankat	22	0 (uninhabited)
Bankat	171	3,077
Bara	153	1,938
Baruna	130	1,035
Basdeopur	122	1,103
Bela	39	732
Belauna	76	1,249
Bharsanda Jado	87	3,163
Bharsanda Mangit	104	1,310
Bhinriya	111	1,249
Bhoja Chak	43	316
Bibi Mah Chak	42	281
Bikrampur	26	0 (uninhabited)
Bikrampur	145	936
Birpur	136	2,785
Chakwath (GP)	482	4,964
Chaughara	57	133
Dalpatpur	40	960
Dariwan	102	0 (uninhabited)
Dhanikara	28	0 (uninhabited)
Dharhara	50	881
Dodhra (GP)	253	4,108
Dubauli	28	224
Dusadhi Chak	39	0 (uninhabited)
English Pur	50	900
Gajrar	130	785
Garhatha	53	0 (uninhabited)
Gaudar Chak Tal	45	60
Gaudar Rudar Nagar (GP)	208	5,015
Ghagha (GP)	70	2,126
Hirdepur	89	294
Itwa	108	2,207
Jadopur	278	2,923
Jamua	176	2,308
Jogibir	197	1,661
Kaleyanpur (GP)	269	5,923
Kamriaon (GP)	251	4,259
Kanela	34	841
Kaneli	126	1,815
Kanhai Geyan Sinh	131	0 (uninhabited)
Karkhiyan	106	1,168
Katea (GP)	582	6,329
Kauriya	191	2,208
Kawalpura	60	0 (uninhabited)
Kewal Patti	129	1,023
Khakhu Bandh	202	426
Kharauni	153	1,373
Kuardah	114	907
Kundesar	362	3,141
Mahuaon	291	3,093
Makhdumpur	89	946
Maniara	206	1,565
Marinpur	141	1,317
Marwatia	86	0 (uninhabited)
Maujhali (GP)	171	3,162
Meha Chak	110	71
Misrauli	53	1,222
Mohanpur	27	0 (uninhabited)
Moti Rampur	27	875
Nainagarha	35	0 (uninhabited)
Narayanpur	32	1,297
Narayanpur	46	546
Nausha Tanr	87	1,019
Nawada	199	2,058
Nawadih	113	1,059
Osain	480	6,308
Pahari Pipra	32	0 (uninhabited)
Parariya	40	0 (uninhabited)
Patkhaulia	36	0 (uninhabited)
Phingi (GP)	152	2,557
Phulai	65	955
Pipra Jagdishpur (GP)	115	2,830
Rajaur	309	0 (uninhabited)
Ramdatahi	18	321
Ramdubwal	74	0 (uninhabited)
Rampur	40	520
Rani Sagar (GP)	113	7,711
Rati Dubawal	61	0 (uninhabited)
Rustampur	48	0 (uninhabited)
Sahjauli	180	1,473
Saho Dih	191	1,673
Samardah	103	2,282
Sharaur	183	2,175
Shiupur (GP)	217	2,653
Sikariya	352	2,843
Sirampur	19	0 (uninhabited)
Sukhari Chak	41	0 (uninhabited)
Sukrauli	67	0 (uninhabited)
Teghra	130	3,049
Tetariya	99	907
Tiar (GP)	841	4,338
Tikhpur	156	0 (uninhabited)
