= Indrapuri Barrage =

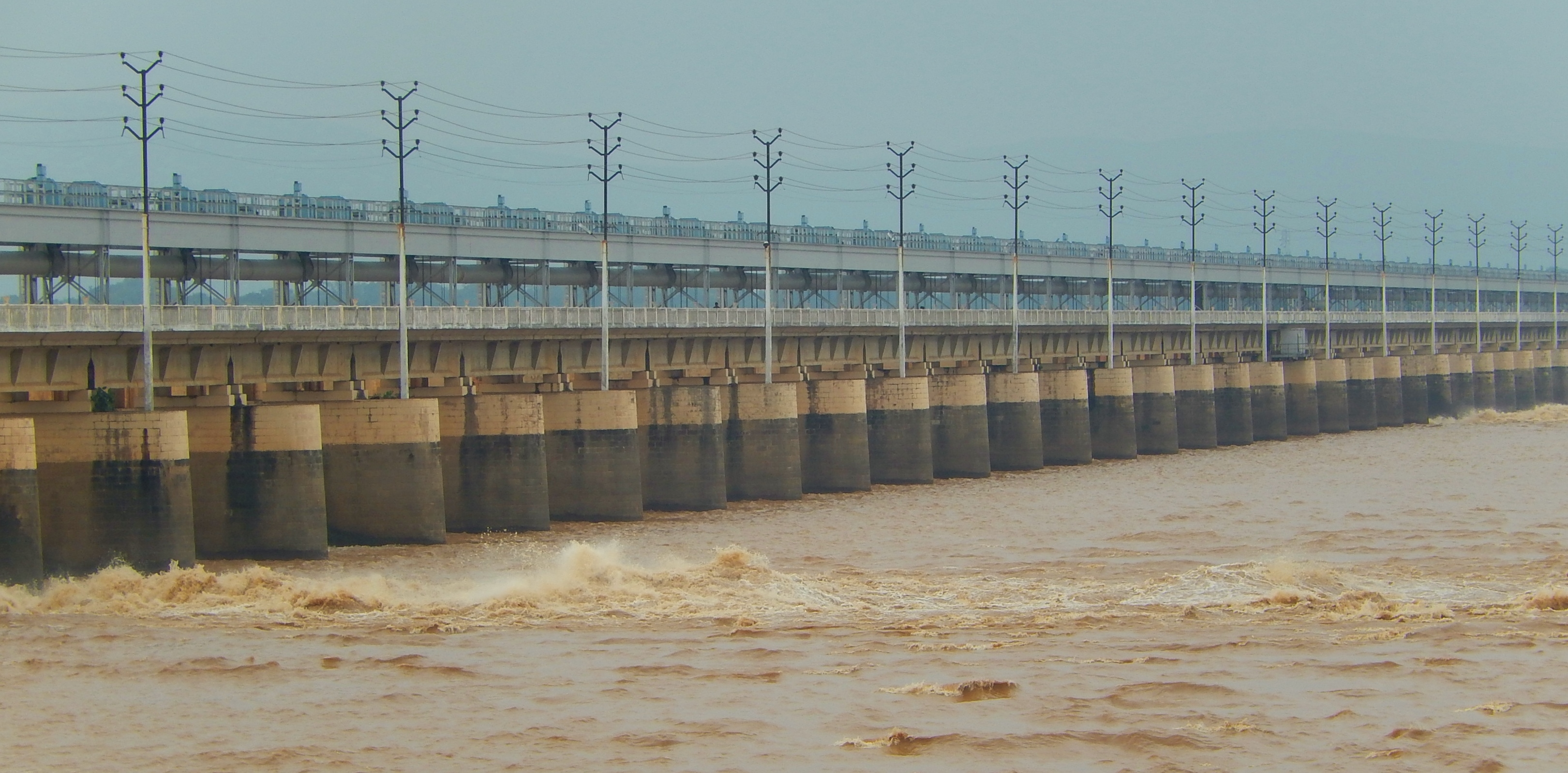
- Interactive map of Indrapuri Barrage
- Location: Rohtas District, Bihar, India
- Coordinates: 24.8369°N 84.1344°E
- Opening date: 1968

Dam and spillways
- Impounds: Son River
- Length: 1,407 metres (4,616 ft)

Indrapuri Barrage (also known as the Sone Barrage) is across the Son River in Rohtas district in the Indian state of Bihar.

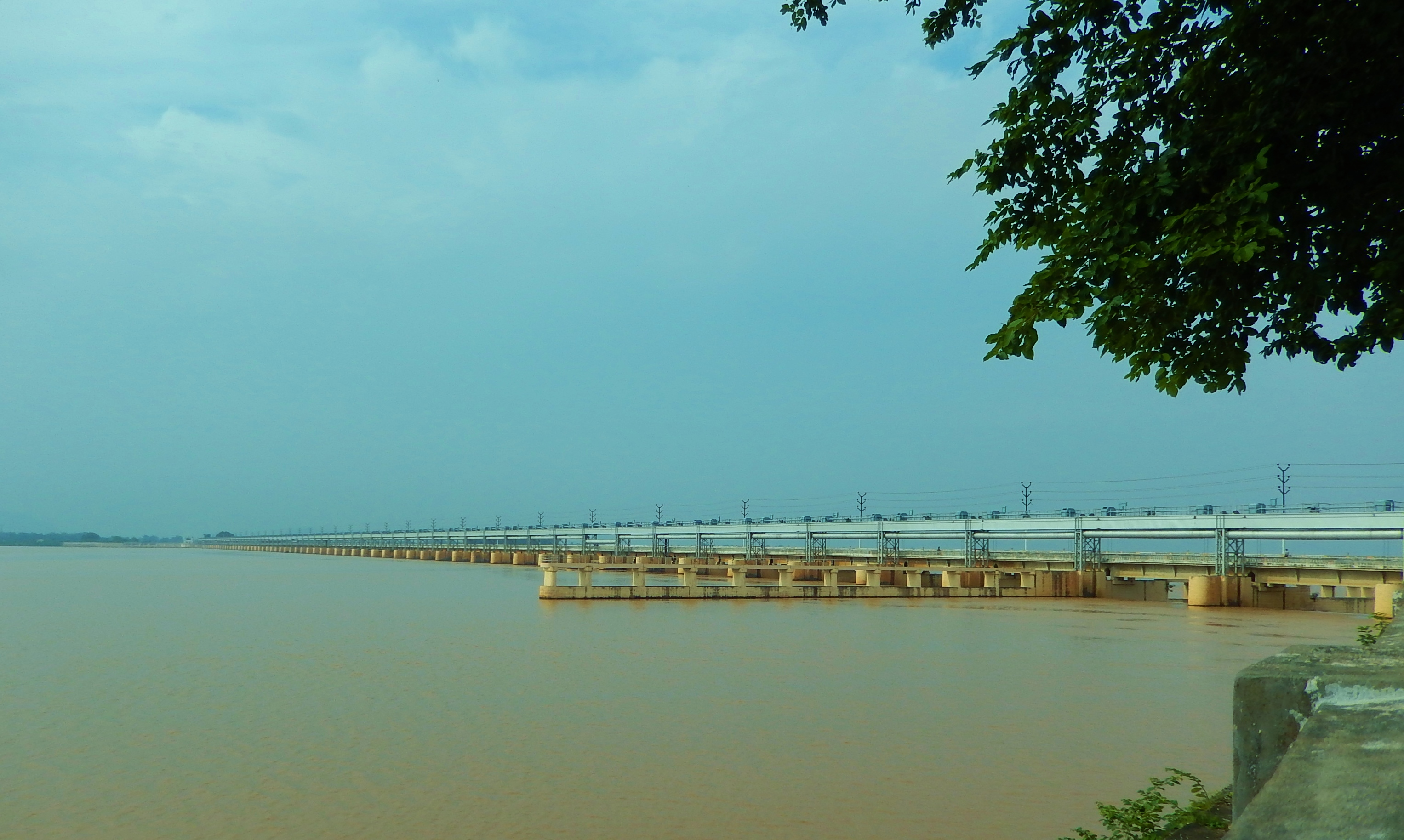
Indrapuri Dam

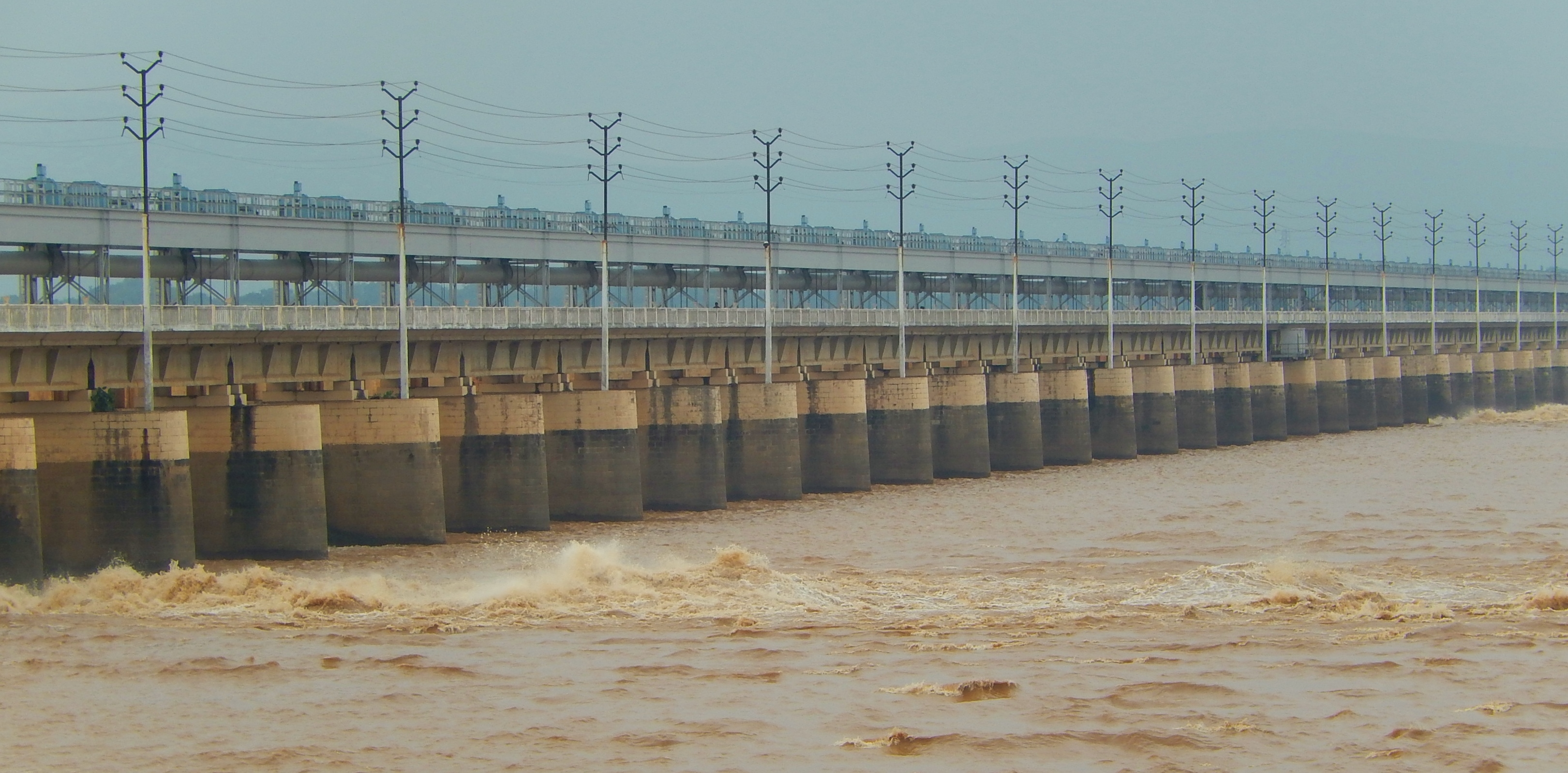
Front view

== The Barrage ==
The Sone Barrage at Indrapuri is 1,407 metres (4,616 ft) long and is the fourth longest barrage in the world. It was constructed by Hindustan Construction Company (HCC), the company which constructed the 2,253 m long Farakka Barrage, the longest in the world. Construction of the barrage was taken up in the 1960s and it was commissioned in 1968.

== The Canal System ==
In 1873–74, one of the oldest irrigation systems in the country was developed with an anicut across the Son at Dehri. Water from the Son fed canal systems on both sides of the river and irrigated large areas. A barrage was constructed 8 km upstream of the anicut. Two link canals connected the new reservoir to the old irrigation system and also extended it.

Sir John Houlton, the veteran British administrator, described (in 1949) the Son canal system as follows, "This is easily the largest canal system in Bihar; there are 209 miles of main canals, 149 of branch canals and 1,235 of distributaries… The canals are of enormous benefit to cultivation. They have converted a large area of infertile land into a richly productive area."

== Future plans ==
There is a proposal for the construction of a dam across the Son, between Kadwan in Garhwa district of Jharkhand and Matiwan in Rohtas district of Bihar.

As per the National River Linking Project of the National Water Development Agency, there is a proposal for linking the Ganges with the Son, through the 149.10 km Chunar-Sone Barrage Link Canal. The canal will start from the right side of the Ganges near Chunar tehsil of Mirzapur district in UP and would link to the Indrapuri barrage. There would be three lifts at three places on the route. The lifts would be of 38.8 m, 16.10 m and 4.4 m.
