= Gangi River =

River in Arrah, India

The Gangi 𑂏𑂰𑂑𑂹𑂏𑂲 (Bhojpuri)
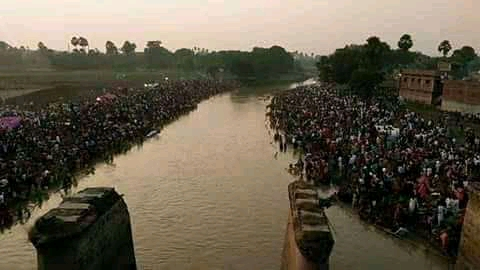
- Chhath celebration at Gangi

Location
- Country: India
- State: Bihar
- District: Bhojpur District
- Cities: Arrah

Physical characteristics
- Source: 5 Km west of Arrah (where Banas ends)

Gangi is a perennial river channel and an offshoot of the Ganga which mainly flows near the town of Arrah in Bihar in India. It originates in 5 miles west of Arrah, when Banas fall into it, and flows in a northerly direction, running parallel to the main channel of the Ganga. After passing east of Arrah, it joins the Ganga at Keshavpur, near the border of the Bhojpur district.

== History ==
It is believed it is the ancient stream of the river Ganga. Huien Tsang has written in his account that Ganga was 10 km (6.2 mi) from the village of Masarh which also indicates that earlier the Ganga used to flow faster in the South than present which is the present route of Gangi. The high bank of old river bed can still be traced in Bhojpur and Buxar.

== Course ==
The Gangi's course is entirely within the Gangetic plains. It originates 5 miles west of Arrah and in the present state seem to the continuation of the Banas. The river's channel is meandering and passes several villages in the plains north to Arrah. After crossing Arrah, it takes a northward turn and it journey ends at Keshavpur, where it flows into the River Ganga.

During its journey, the Gangi serves as a primary drainage channel for the region, collecting water from several other rivers and man-made watercourses such as the Nagri River, Malai Drain, and the Banas River. Additionally, the Ara Canal joins it from the east near the village of Ramsagar.
