= Bachri, Jagdishpur =

Bachri
- Village
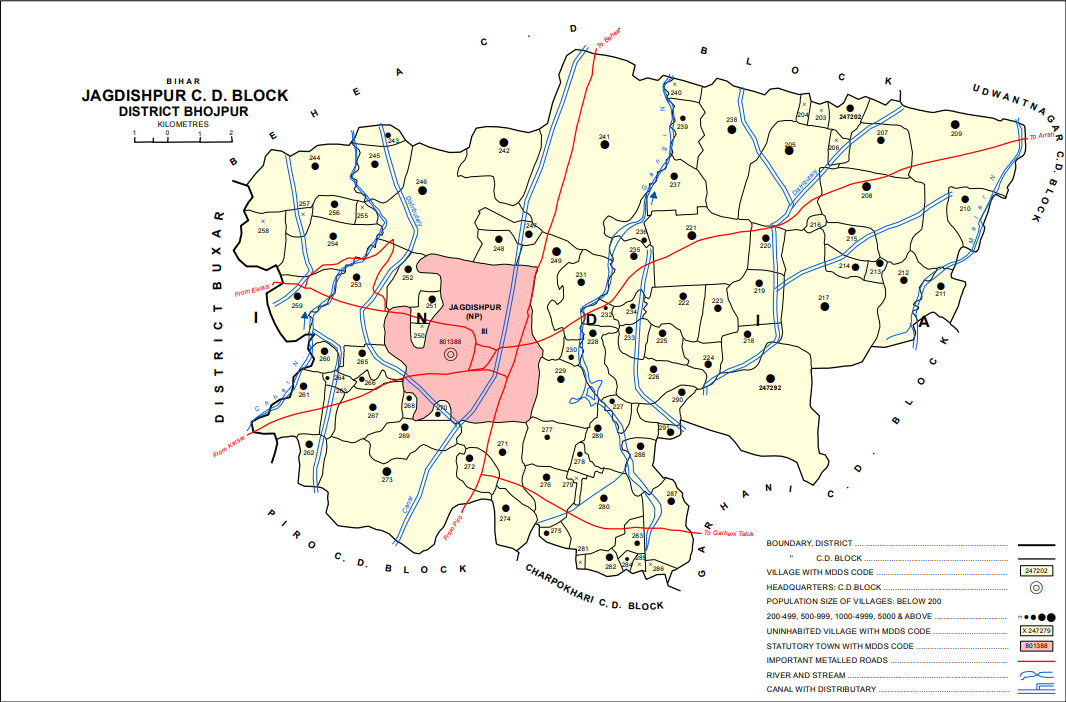
- Map of Bachri (#268) in Jagdishpur block

- Location in Bihar, India Bachri (India)
- Coordinates: 25.44761°N 84.39361°E
- Country: India
- State: Bihar
- District: Bhojpur

Area
  - Total: 0.042 km^{2} (0.016 sq mi)
- Elevation: 77 m (253 ft)

Population (2011)
  - Total: 610
  - Density: 15,000/km^{2} (38,000/sq mi)

Languages
  - Official: Bhojpuri, Hindi
- Time zone: UTC+5:30 (IST)

Bachri is a village in Jagdishpur block of Bhojpur district in Bihar, India. As of 2011, its population was 610, in 93 households.

Dumraon Tola area is located nearby.
