= Siyaruwa =

Siyaruwa Siyāruwa
- Village
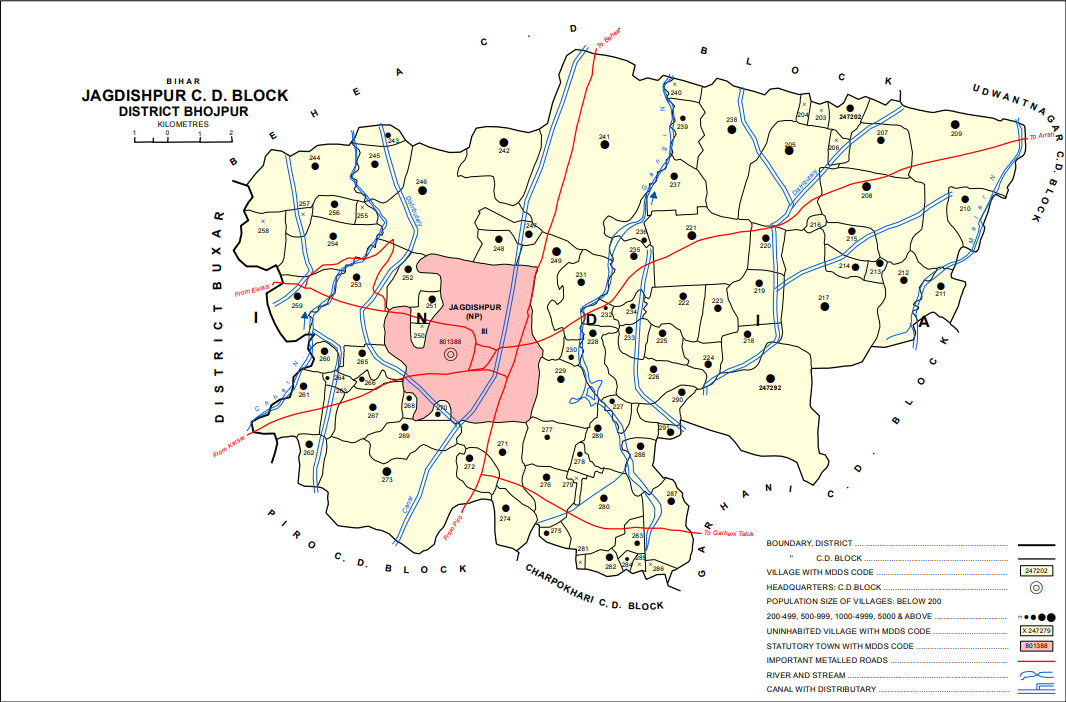
- Map of Siyaruwa (#229) in Jagdishpur block

- Location in Bihar, India Siyaruwa (India)
- Coordinates: 25.45697°N 84.44284°E
- Country: India
- State: Bihar
- District: Bhojpur

Area
  - Total: 0.358 km^{2} (0.138 sq mi)
- Elevation: 71 m (233 ft)

Population (2011)
  - Total: 3,146
  - Density: 8,790/km^{2} (22,800/sq mi)

Languages
  - Official: Bhojpuri, Hindi
- Time zone: UTC+5:30 (IST)

Siyaruwa is a village in the Jagdishpur block of Bhojpur district in Bihar, India. In 2011 its population was 3,146 in 488 households. It is southeast of the city of Jagdishpur.
