= Hetampur, Bihar =

Hetampur
- Village
- Location in Bihar, India Hetampur (India)
- Coordinates: 25.5033318°N 84.412014°E
- Country: India
- State: Bihar
- District: Bhojpur

Government
  - Type: Democracy
  - Body: Panchayati Raj, Govt. of Bihar & Govt. of Republic of India
- Elevation: 193 m (633 ft)

Population (2011 Census)
  - Total: 7,575

Languages
  - Official: Bhojpuri, Hindi
- Time zone: UTC+5:30 (IST)
- PIN: 802158
- Telephone code: 91 53671
- ISO 3166 code: IN-BR
- Lok Sabha constituency: Arrah
- Vidhan Sabha constituency: Jagdishpur
- Website: http://bhojpur.bih.nic.in/

Hetampur is a large village in Jagdispur tehsil of Bhojpur district, Bihar, India.

== Population ==
Hetampur is a large village located in Jagdishpur of Bhojpur district, Bihar with total 1214 families residing. The Hetampur village has population of 7575 of which 3962 are males while 3613 are females as per Population Census 2011.

In Hetampur village population of children with age 0–6 is 1314 which makes up 17.35% of total population of village. Average Sex Ratio of Hetampur village is 912 which is lower than Bihar state average of 918. Child Sex Ratio for the Hetampur as per census is 874, lower than Bihar average of 935.

Hetampur village has lower literacy rate compared to Bihar. In 2011, literacy rate of Hetampur village was 61.12% compared to 61.80% of Bihar. In Hetampur Male literacy stands at 73.87% while female literacy rate was 47.27%.

The village is administrated by Sarpanch (Head of Village) who is elected representative of village.

=== Castes ===
Schedule Caste (SC) constitutes 14.26% of total population in Hetampur village. The village Hetampur currently doesn't have any Schedule Tribe (ST) population.

=== Economy ===
In Hetampur village out of total population, 3274 were engaged in work activities. 35.86% of workers describe their work as Main Work (Employment or Earning more than 6 Months) while 64.14% were involved in Marginal activity providing livelihood for less than 6 months. Of 3274 workers engaged in Main Work, 365 were cultivators (owner or co-owner) while 344 were Agricultural labourer.

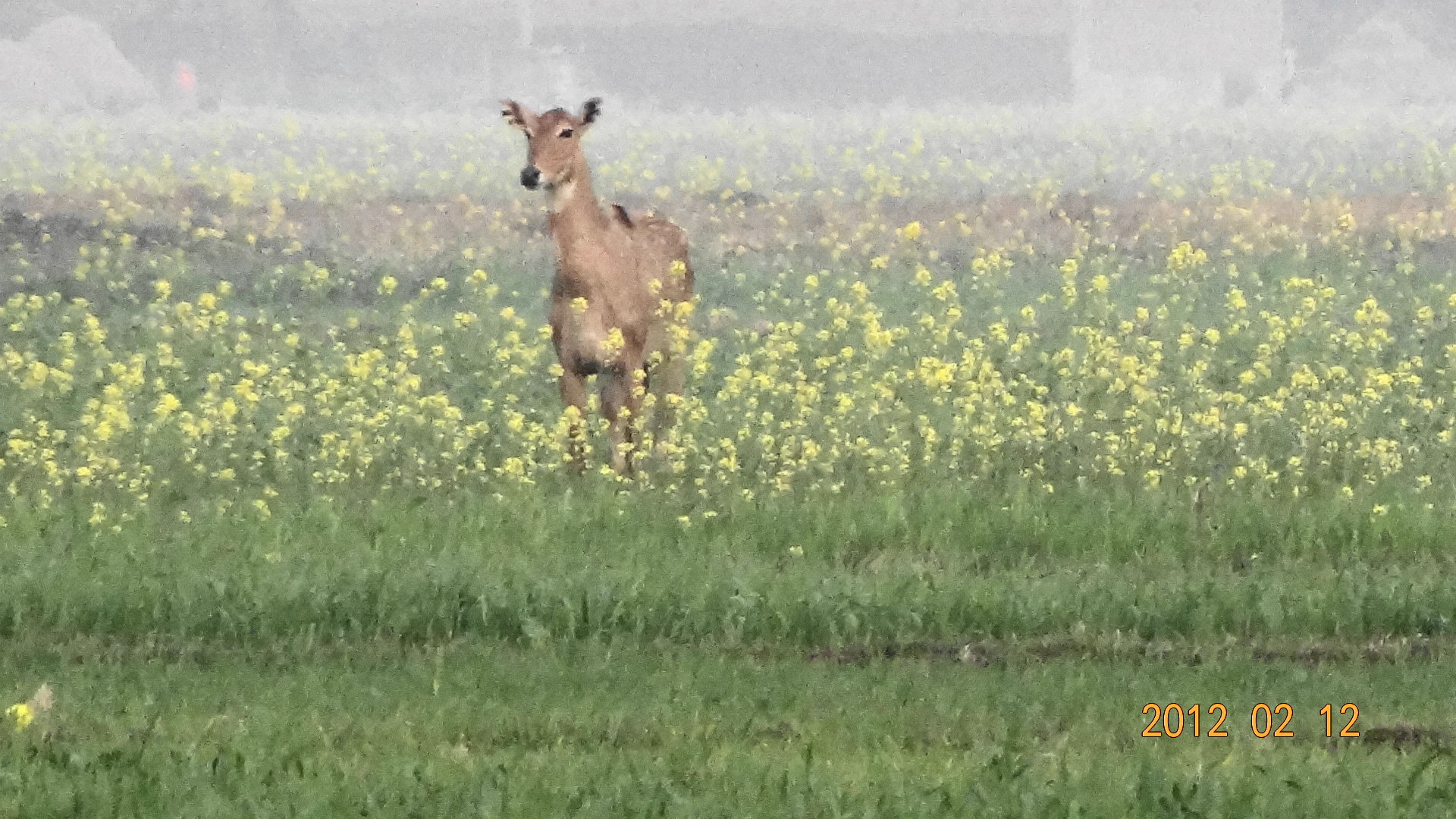
Nilgai (Bluebull)

== Language ==
Common dialect is Bhojpuri language. Hindi and English are also used.

== Villages near Hetampur ==
- Kamriaon 3.8 km
- Jagdishpur 4.1 km
- Rani Sagar 8.1 km
- Shahpur 9.0 km
- Raghunathpur 9.1 km
- Barhampur 14 km
- Baligaon 14 km
- Nawada 15 km
- Benwaliya 16 km
- Chaugain 17 km
- DIHARI 1.5 km

=== Markets ===
- Jagdishpur •Ara
- Nayka tola
- behea
- Banahi
- Uttardaha

== Connectivity ==
=== Railways ===
Nearest railway stations are Banahi, Behea, and Ara which are well connected with major railway stations of North and Eastern Railways.

=== Roadways ===
- Highways:- State Highway 102(5.2 km away), NH 30(16.3 km away), NH 84(20.2 km away)
- It is connected to Jagdishpur, Shahpur, Piro and State Highway 102 at Jagdishpur through Rural roads.
- There is also a new road completed under Pradhamantri Gramin Sarak Yojna of Govt. of India and its very fine running parallel to canal called Hetampur road connecting Jagdishpur, State Highway, Naykatola, Shivpur, Hetampur and many more places

=== Airways ===
Nearest Airport is Lok Nayak Jayaprakash Airport, Phulwari Sharif, Patna which is nearly 90 km away from Hetampur

== Postal Address ==
Post Office: HETAMPUR, District: Bhojpur, Bihar, Pin Code: 802158 India
