= Masurhi, Bhojpur =

Village in Bihar, India

Masurhi
- Village
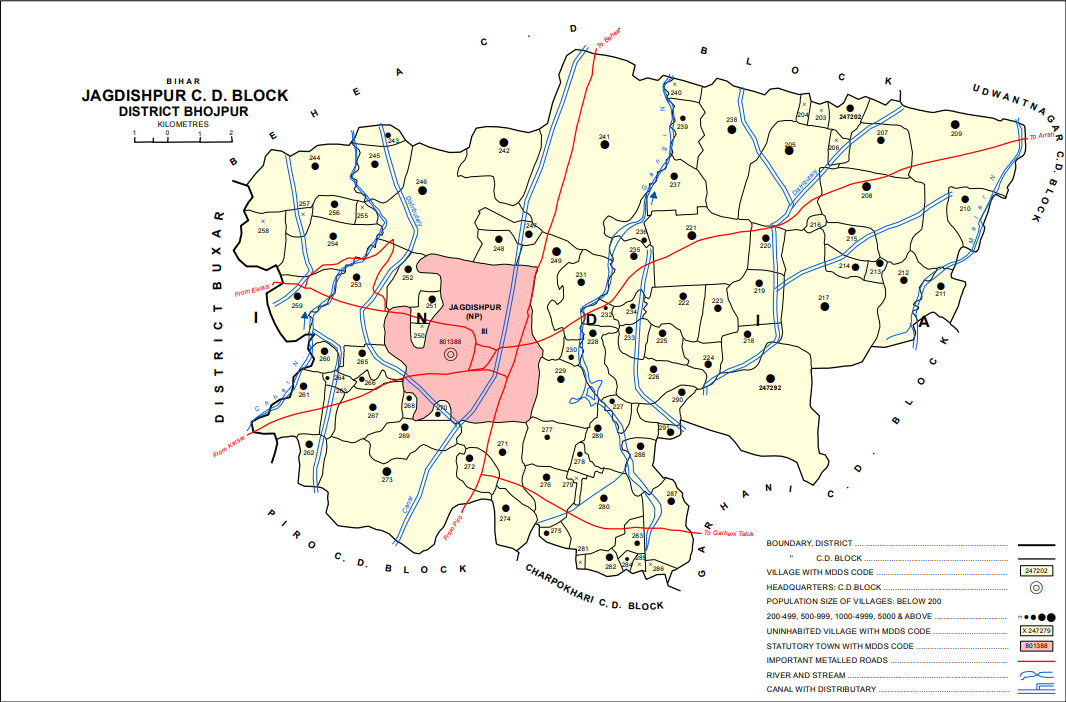
- Map of Masurhi (#226) in Jagdishpur block

- Location in Bihar, India Masurhi (India)
- Coordinates: 25.46379°N 84.46001°E
- Country: India
- State: Bihar
- District: Bhojpur

Area
  - Total: 0.372 km^{2} (0.144 sq mi)
- Elevation: 70 m (230 ft)

Population (2011)
  - Total: 3,426
  - Density: 9,210/km^{2} (23,900/sq mi)

Languages
  - Official: Bhojpuri, Hindi
- Time zone: UTC+5:30 (IST)

Masurhi is a village in Jagdishpur block of Bhojpur district in Bihar, India. As of 2011, its population was 3,426, in 586 households.
