= Ugna =

- Village
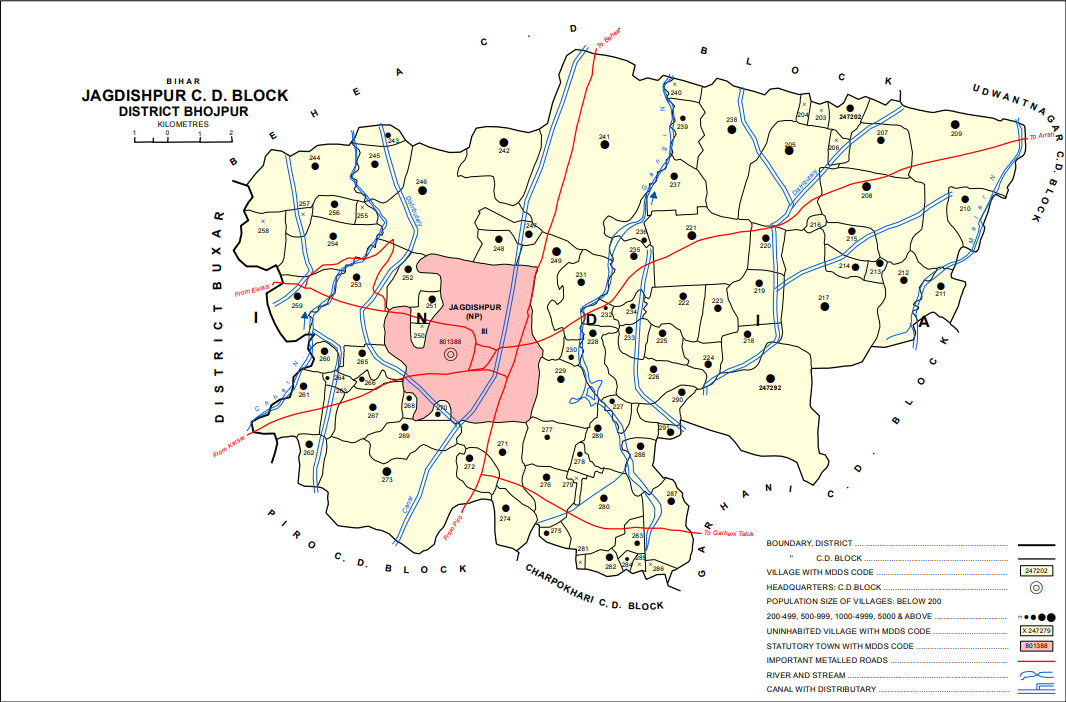
- Map of Ugna (#288) in Jagdishpur block

- Location in Bihar, India Ugna (India)
- Coordinates: 25.43629°N 84.46447°E
- Country: India
- State: Bihar
- District: Bhojpur

Area
  - Total: 0.144 km^{2} (0.056 sq mi)
- Elevation: 72 m (236 ft)

Population (2011)
  - Total: 2,672
  - Density: 18,600/km^{2} (48,100/sq mi)

Languages
  - Official: Bhojpuri, Hindi
- Time zone: UTC+5:30 (IST)

Ugna is a village in Jagdishpur block of Bhojpur district, Bihar, India. As of 2011, its population was 2,672, in 391 households.
