= Sonbarsa, Jagdishpur =

Sonbarsa
- Village
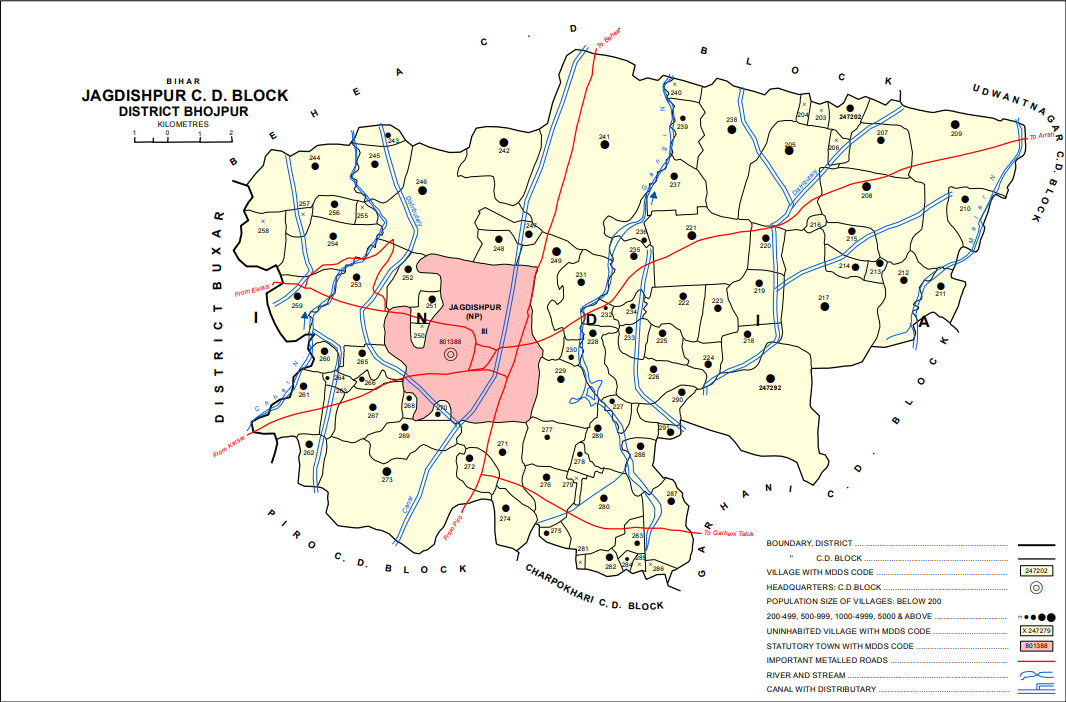
- Map of Sonbarsa (#251) in Jagdishpur block

- Location in Bihar, India Sonbarsa (India)
- Coordinates: 25.47857°N 84.39906°E
- Country: India
- State: Bihar
- District: Bhojpur

Area
  - Total: 0.064 km^{2} (0.025 sq mi)
- Elevation: 72 m (236 ft)

Population (2011)
  - Total: 1,244
  - Density: 19,000/km^{2} (50,000/sq mi)

Languages
  - Official: Bhojpuri, Hindi
- Time zone: UTC+5:30 (IST)

Sonbarsa is a village in Jagdishpur block of Bhojpur district in Bihar, India. As of 2011, its population was 1,244, in 201 households. It is located just northwest of the city of Jagdishpur.
