= Babhniyawan =

Babhniyawan Babhniyāwān
- Village
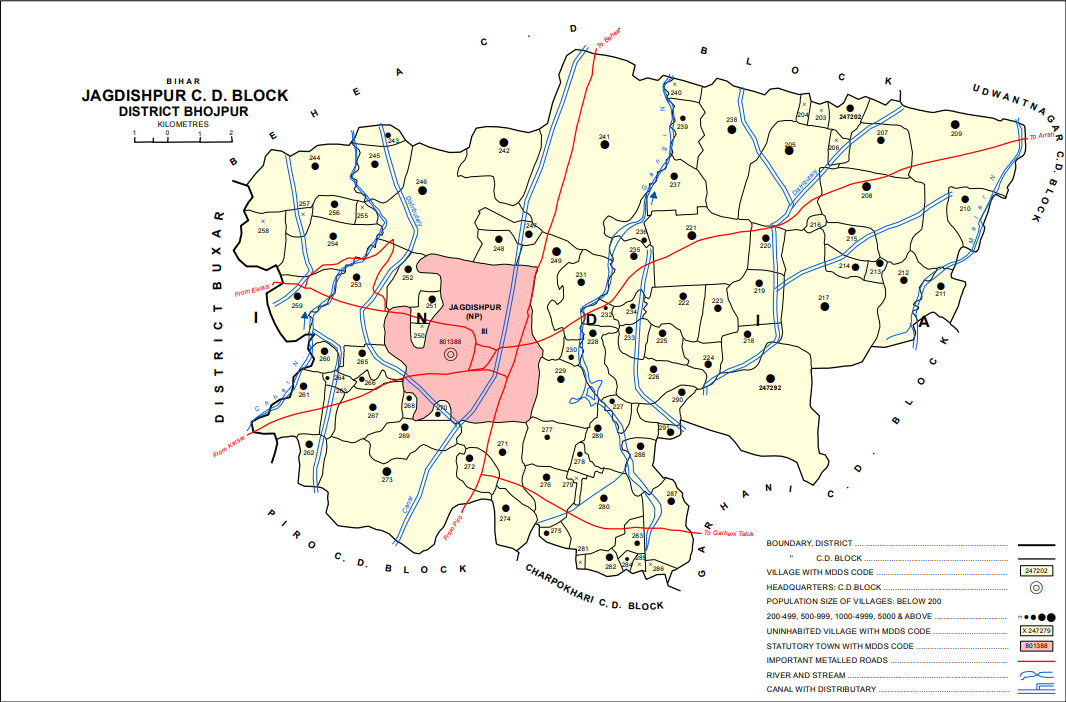
- Map of Siyaruwa (#229) in Jagdishpur block

- Location in Bihar, India Babhniyawan (India)
- Coordinates: 25.49428°N 84.48151°E
- Country: India
- State: Bihar
- District: Bhojpur

Area
  - Total: 0.711 km^{2} (0.275 sq mi)
- Elevation: 71 m (233 ft)

Population (2011)
  - Total: 9,945
  - Density: 14,000/km^{2} (36,200/sq mi)

Languages
  - Official: Bhojpuri, Hindi
- Time zone: UTC+5:30 (IST)

Babhniyawan is a large village in Jagdishpur block of Bhojpur district in Bihar, India. As of 2011, its population was 9,945, in 1,540 households.
