= Aer, Bhojpur =

Aer Āer
- Village
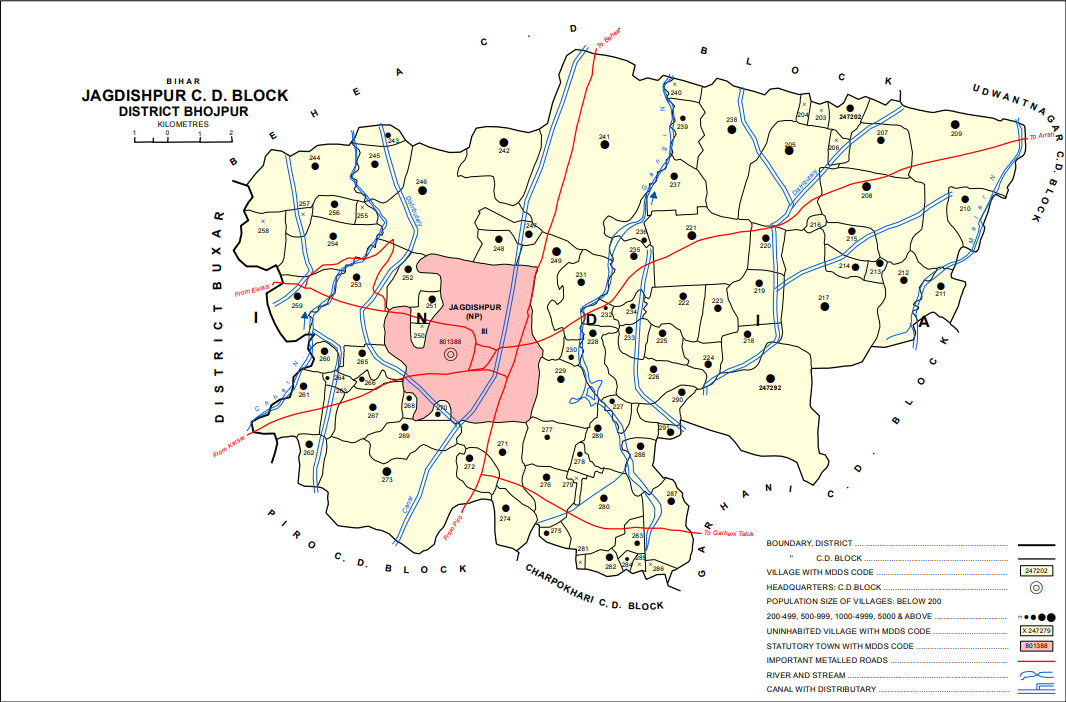
- Map of Aer (#247292) in Jagdishpur block

- Location in Bihar, India Aer (India)
- Coordinates: 25.44554°N 84.50996°E
- Country: India
- State: Bihar
- District: Bhojpur

Area
  - Total: 1.133 km^{2} (0.437 sq mi)
- Elevation: 74 m (243 ft)

Population (2011)
  - Total: 13,305
  - Density: 11,740/km^{2} (30,410/sq mi)

Languages
  - Official: Bhojpuri, Hindi
- Time zone: UTC+5:30 (IST)

Aer is a large village in the southeastern part of Jagdishpur block in Bhojpur district, Bihar, India. As of 2011, its population was 13,305, in 2,127 households.
