= Dhangain, Bhojpur =

Dhangain Dhangāīn
- Village
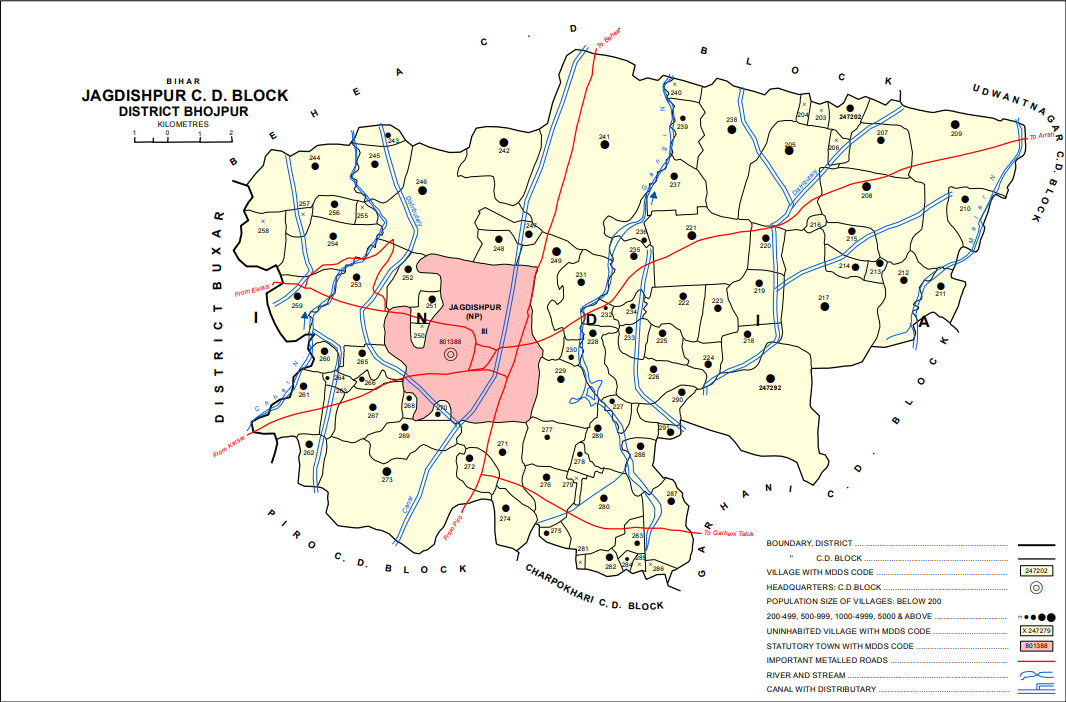
- Map of Dhangain (#267) in Jagdishpur block

- Location in Bihar, India Dhangain (India)
- Coordinates: 25.45044°N 84.3753°E
- Country: India
- State: Bihar
- District: Bhojpur

Area
  - Total: 0.307 km^{2} (0.119 sq mi)
- Elevation: 73 m (240 ft)

Population (2011)
  - Total: 1,710
  - Density: 5,570/km^{2} (14,400/sq mi)

Languages
  - Official: Bhojpuri, Hindi
- Time zone: UTC+5:30 (IST)

Dhangain is a village in Jagdishpur block of Bhojpur district in Bihar, India. As of 2011, its population was 1,710, in 241 households.
