= Asodhar, Bhojpur =

Asodhar
- Village
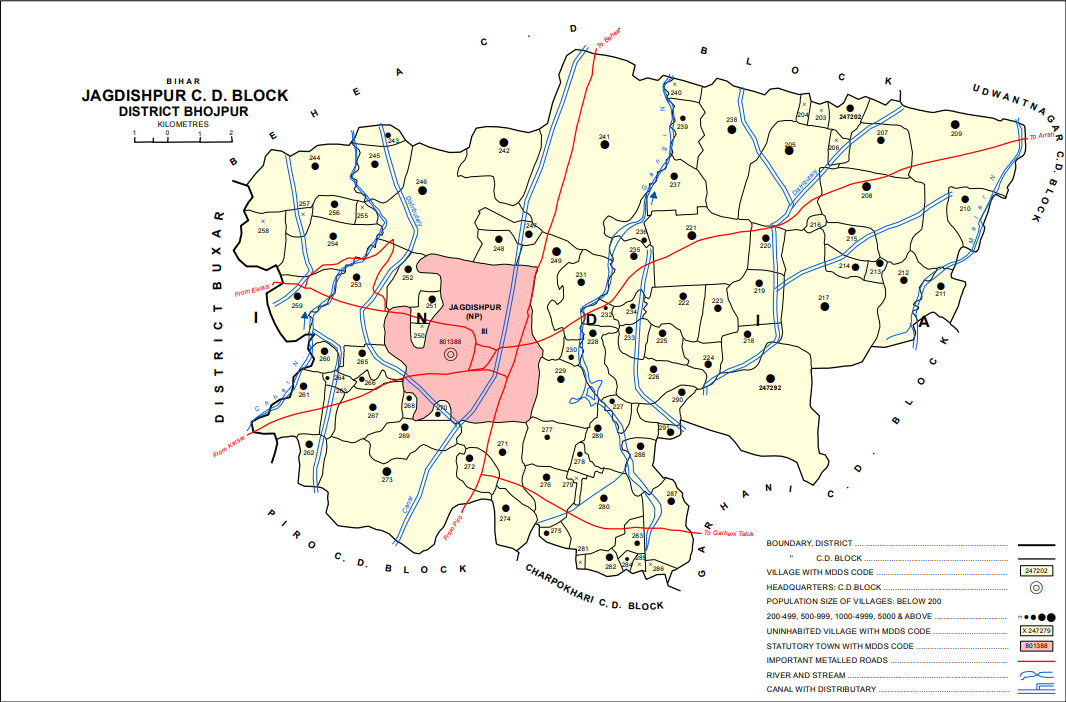
- Map of Asodhar (#227) in Jagdishpur block

- Location in Bihar, India Asodhar (India)
- Coordinates: 25.45048°N 84.45913°E
- Country: India
- State: Bihar
- District: Bhojpur

Area
  - Total: 6.5 ha (16 acres)
- Elevation: 69 m (226 ft)

Population (2011)
  - Total: 861
  - Density: 13,000/km^{2} (34,000/sq mi)

Languages
  - Official: Bhojpuri, Hindi
- Time zone: UTC+5:30 (IST)

Asodhar is a village in Jagdishpur block of Bhojpur district in Bihar, India. As of 2011, its population was 861, in 111 households.
