= Barad Parwa =

Barad Parwa Baradparwa
- Village
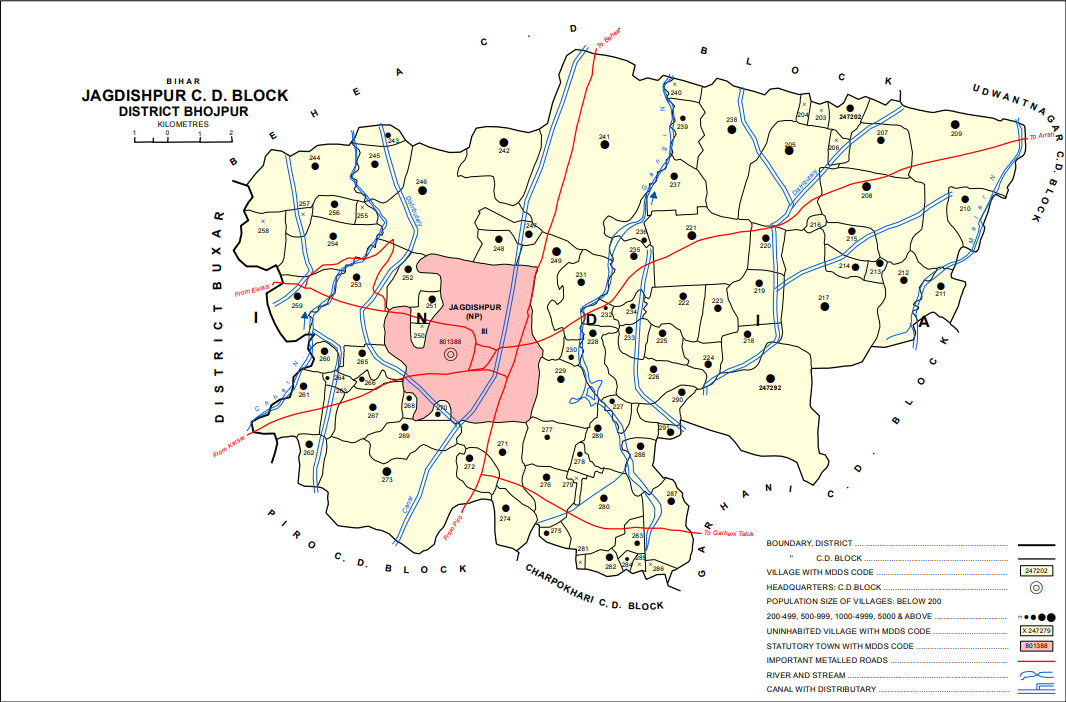
- Map of Baradparwa (#231) in Jagdishpur block

- Location in Bihar, India Barad Parwa (India)
- Coordinates: 25.47559°N 84.44377°E
- Country: India
- State: Bihar
- District: Bhojpur

Area
  - Total: 0.330 km^{2} (0.127 sq mi)
- Elevation: 70 m (230 ft)

Population (2011)
  - Total: 4,327
  - Density: 13,100/km^{2} (34,000/sq mi)

Languages
  - Official: Bhojpuri, Hindi
- Time zone: UTC+5:30 (IST)

Barad Parwa, also spelled Baradparwa, is a village in Jagdishpur block of Bhojpur district in Bihar, India. As of 2011, its population was 4,327, in 714 households.
