= Dumraon Tola =

- Village
- Location in Bihar, India Dumraon Tola (India)
- Coordinates: 25.446016°N 84.409278°E
- Country: India
- State: Bihar
- District: Bhojpur
- Elevation: 74 m (243 ft)

Languages
  - Official: Bhojpuri, Hindi
- Time zone: UTC+5:30 (IST)
- PIN: 802158
- Telephone code: 91-6181
- Vehicle registration: BR-03

Dumraon Tola is a small village near Jagdishpur (Bhojpur) Bihar, India.
