= Kakila =

Kakila is a village in the Jagdishpur thana of Bihar (India). It falls under Bhojpur District, and it is around 30 kilometers from the District Headquarters Arrah. Kakila provides a view of nature as it is surrounded by greenery, ponds and rivers.

It has a population of around 5,000. The major profession of the people residing in this village is agriculture. It has a good mixture of people belonging to different religions and castes. The majority community is Hindu with a Muslim minority (specially of Pashtuns)

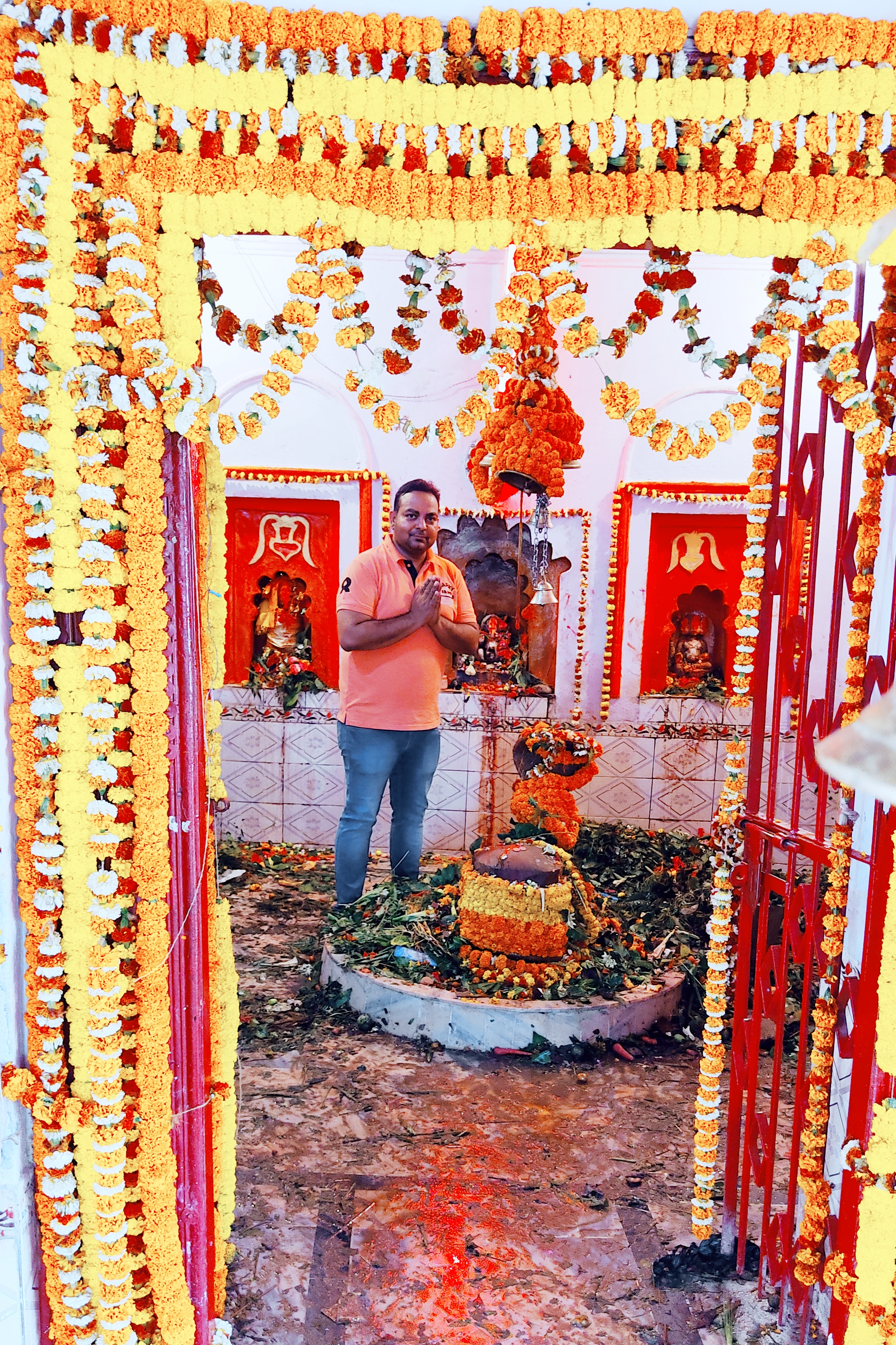
Kakileshwar Mahadev

Ramlila is one of the major attractions performed in this village. Ramlila is performed every year on the occasion of Durga Puja with local actors playing all the major roles in the Ramlila. There is a great history behind the Ramlila organization in this village. Also, there are lot of musical programs performed throughout the year on several occasions. The theme of the music is the regional folk songs. "Chaita" or "Fagua" is the main folk song performed specially during the festival Holi. Also, The world famous Chhath songs can be heard in the Chhath Puja season.

The major festivals celebrated in Kakila are mainly all the major festivals celebrated across India/Bihar. Holi, Diwali, Chhath, Id, Muharram are the main festivals people celebrate with great enthusiasm. Other local festivals are Ramnavami, Mahashivaratri, Govardhan Puja etc. This village has a Shiva Temple (also known as Kakileshwar Mahadev), where Mahashivaratri is celebrated on a big scale. A big village fair is organized every year in the month of March on Mahashivaratri. This fair is organized on a big scale. People from neighboring villages as well as far flung areas participate with great zeal. Gur Jalebis and Samosa chat are the local delicacies widely available across the stalls in the fair. Earlier, there happened to be a small cattle fair as well which has been discontinued since a decade.

About Kakila
| Village Name | Kakila ( ककिला ) |
| Block Name | Jagdishpur |
| District | Bhojpur |
| State | Bihar |
| Language | Bhojpuri, Hindi, Urdu |
| Time zone | IST (UTC+5:30) |
| Elevation / Altitude | 67 meters above Sea level |
| Telephone Code / Std Code | 06181 |
| Assembly constituency | Jagdishpur assembly constituency |
| Lok Sabha constituency | Arrah parliamentary constituency |
| Pin Code | 802158 |
| Post Office Name | Kakila |
| Police Station | Jagdishpur |
| Schools in Kakila | Govt Middle School, Kakila |
| Total Population | 3279 (*2011) |
| Literacy Rate | 55.6% (*2011) |

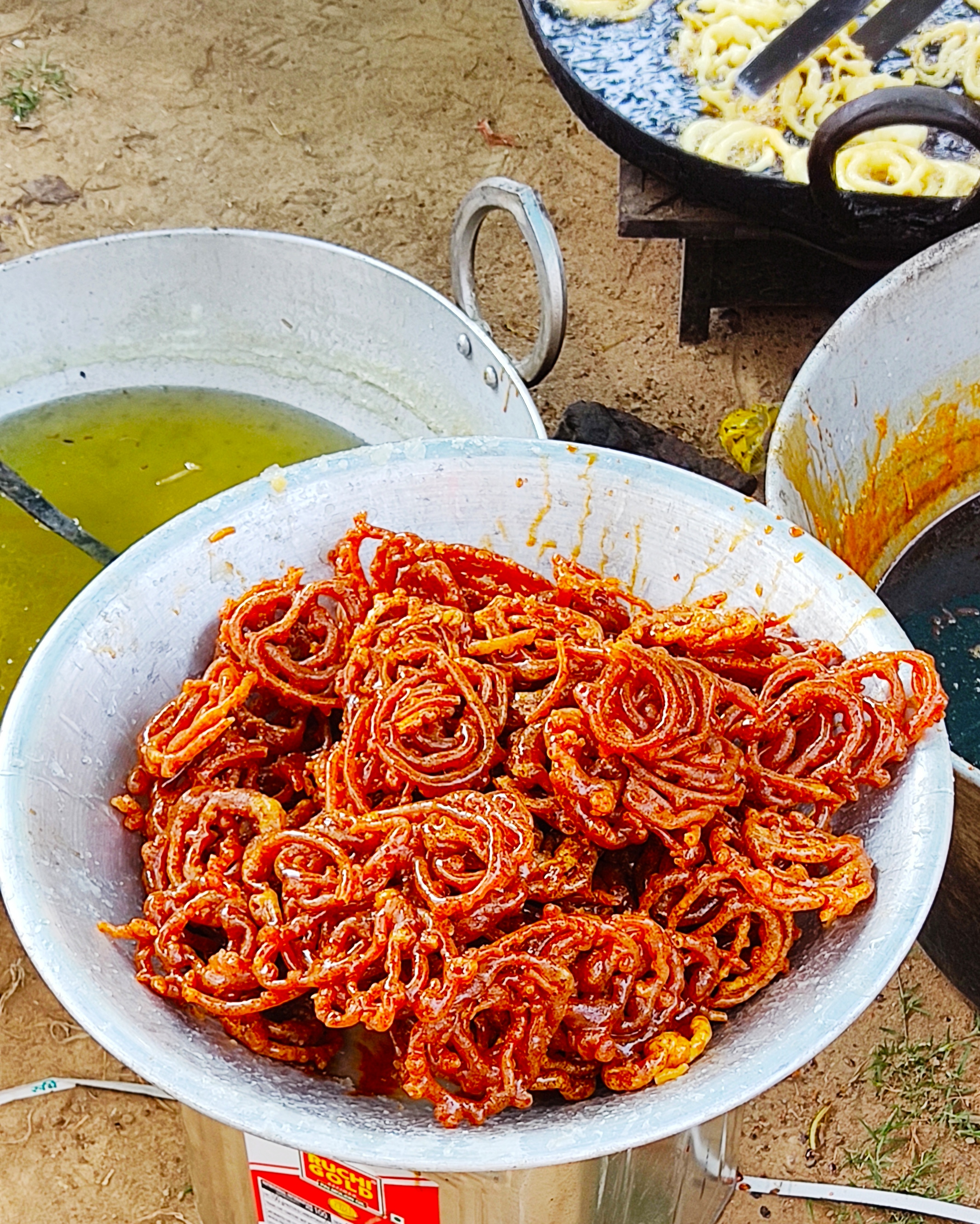
Gur Jalebi

== How to reach Kakila ==
=== By Rail ===
Behea, Garhani, Charpokhari and Piro are the nearby railway stations to Kakila. Ara Junction is 30 km from Kakila which is on Delhi-Howrah main line.

=== By Road ===
Jagdishpur, Behea, Arrah are the nearby towns having road connectivity to Kakila.

=== By Air ===
Patna is the nearest airport (90 kilometers).

== Sources ==
- http://wikimapia.org/9030552/Kakila-village
