= Dulaur, Bhojpur =

Dulaur
- Village
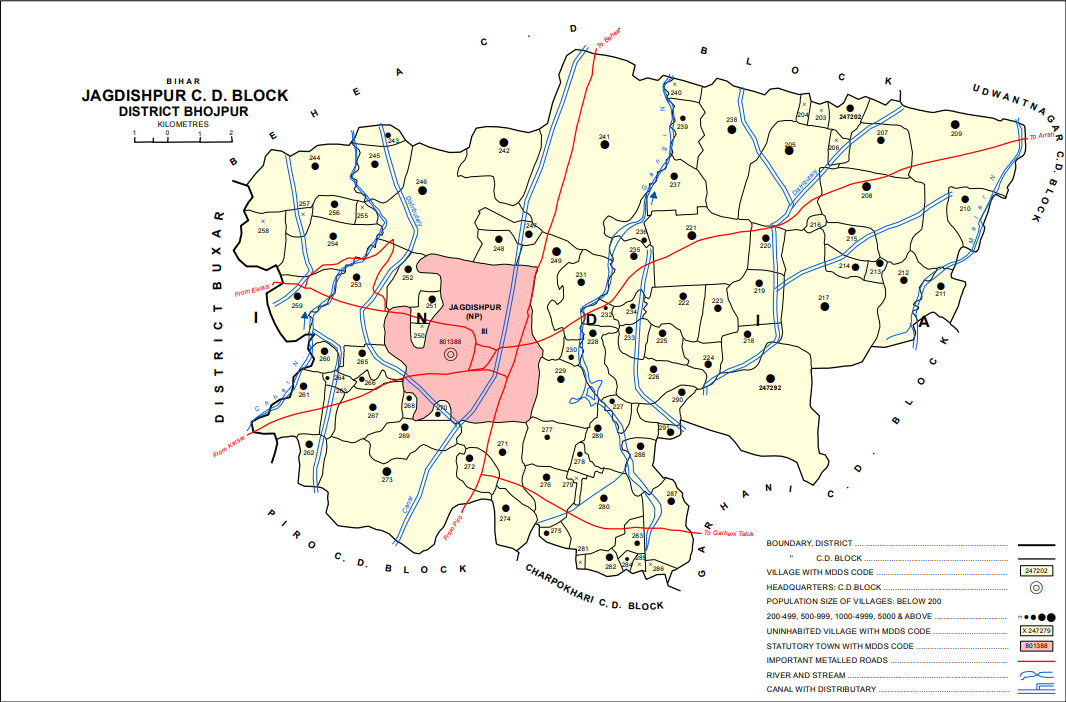
- Map of Dulaur (#232) in Jagdishpur block

- Location in Bihar, India Dulaur (India)
- Coordinates: 25.47642°N 84.45069°E
- Country: India
- State: Bihar
- District: Bhojpur

Area
  - Total: 0.113 km^{2} (0.044 sq mi)
- Elevation: 67 m (220 ft)

Population (2011)
  - Total: 345
  - Density: 3,050/km^{2} (7,910/sq mi)

Languages
  - Official: Bhojpuri, Hindi
- Time zone: UTC+5:30 (IST)

Dulaur is a small village in Jagdishpur block of Bhojpur district in Bihar, India. As of 2011, its population was 345, in 47 households. Located 2 km east of Jagdishpur, Dulaur is known as having been the site of the final battle between Kunwar Singh and the British army during the Indian Rebellion of 1857.
