= Danwan =

Danwan Danwān
- Village
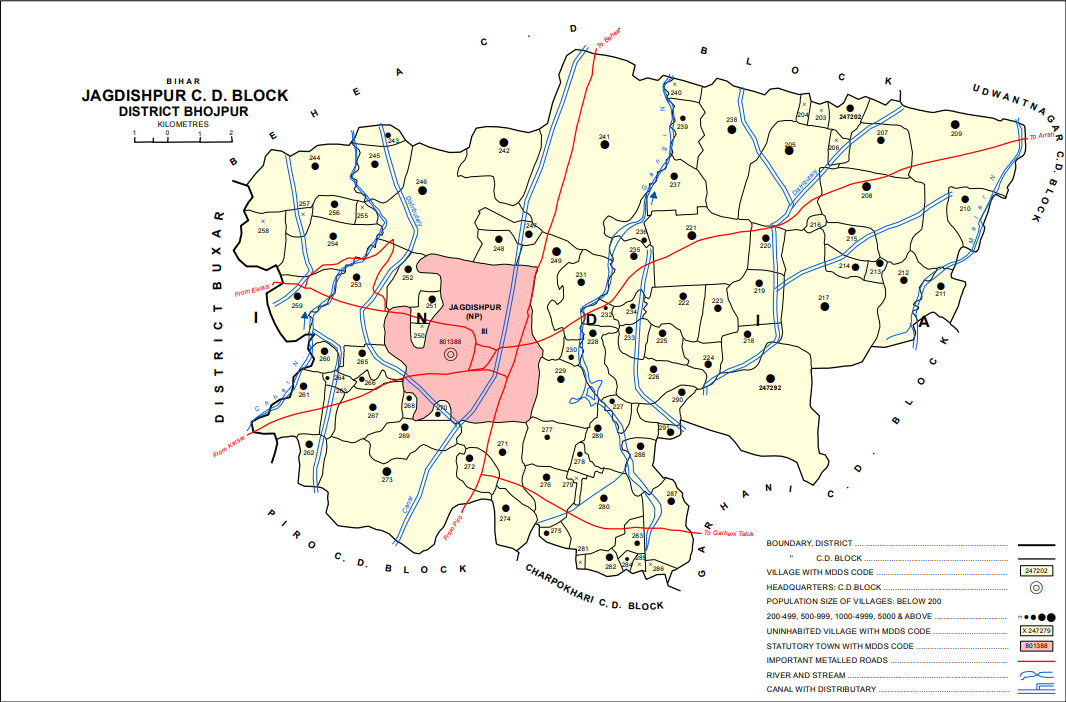
- Map showing Danwan (#241) in Jagdishpur block

- Location in Bihar, India Danwan (India)
- Coordinates: 25.52921°N 84.45979°E
- Country: India
- State: Bihar
- District: Bhojpur

Area
  - Total: 20.50 km^{2} (7.92 sq mi)
- Elevation: 70 m (230 ft)

Population (2011)
  - Total: 14,523
  - Density: 708.4/km^{2} (1,835/sq mi)

Languages
  - Official: Bhojpuri, Hindi
- Time zone: UTC+5:30 (IST)

Danwan is a large village in Jagdishpur block of Bhojpur district, Bihar, India. It is located in the northern part of the block, near the border with Bihiya block. As of 2011, its population was 14,523, in 2,481 households.
