= Mungaul, Bhojpur =

Mungaul
- Village
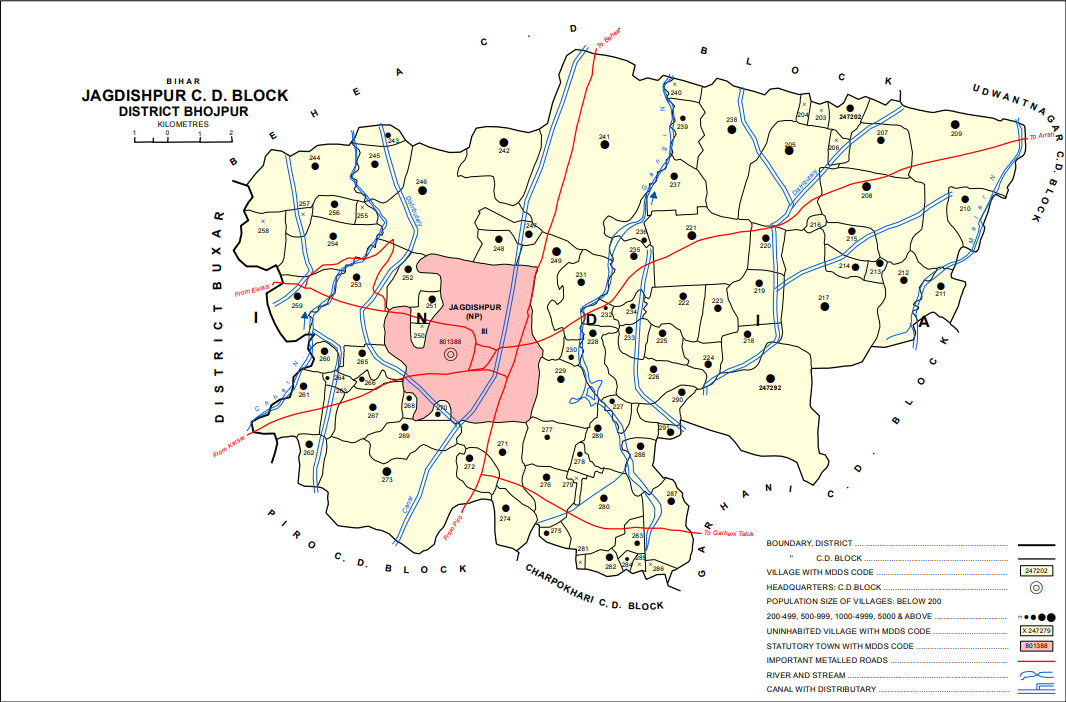
- Map of Mungaul (#230) in Jagdishpur block

- Location in Bihar, India Mungaul (India)
- Coordinates: 25.4688°N 84.44276°E
- Country: India
- State: Bihar
- District: Bhojpur

Area
  - Total: 0.045 km^{2} (0.017 sq mi)
- Elevation: 74 m (243 ft)

Population (2011)
  - Total: 504
  - Density: 11,000/km^{2} (29,000/sq mi)

Languages
  - Official: Bhojpuri, Hindi
- Time zone: UTC+5:30 (IST)

Mungaul is a small village in Jagdishpur block of Bhojpur district in Bihar, India. As of 2011, its population was 504, in 94 households. It is located east of the city of Jagdishpur.
