= Deorar, Bhojpur =

Deorar Deorār
- Village
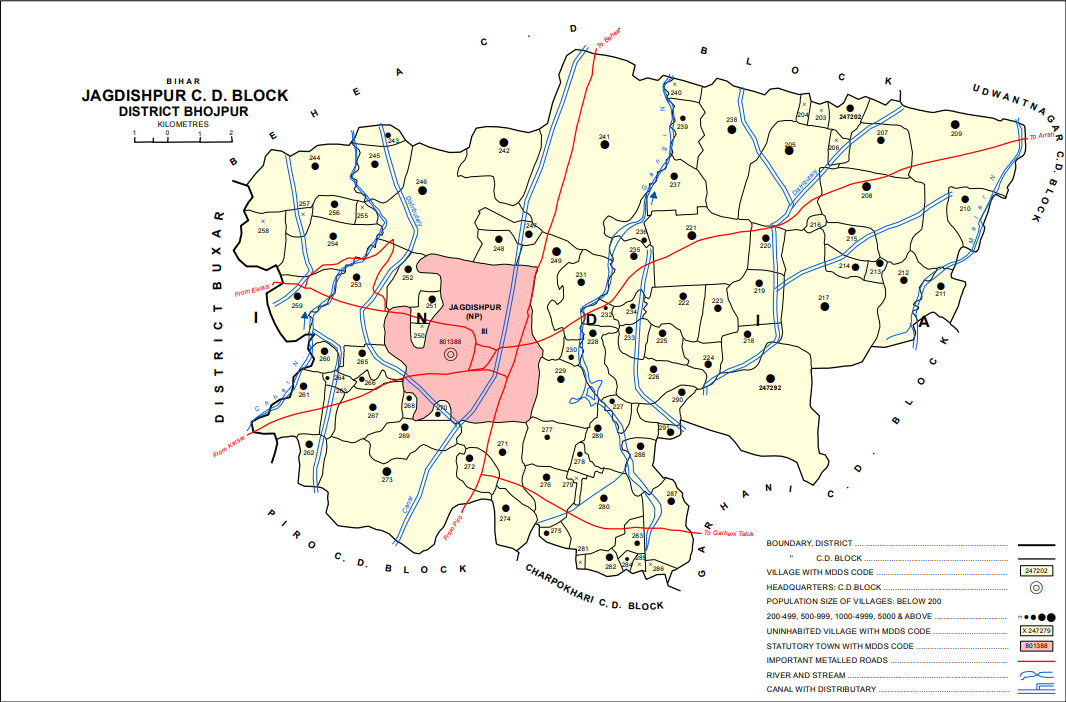
- Map of Deorar (#259) in Jagdishpur block

- Location in Bihar, India Deorar (India)
- Coordinates: 25.48219°N 84.3633°E
- Country: India
- State: Bihar
- District: Bhojpur

Area
  - Total: 0.249 km^{2} (0.096 sq mi)
- Elevation: 70 m (230 ft)

Population (2011)
  - Total: 3,080
  - Density: 12,400/km^{2} (32,000/sq mi)

Languages
  - Official: Bhojpuri, Hindi
- Time zone: UTC+5:30 (IST)

Deorar is a village in Jagdishpur block of Bhojpur district in Bihar, India. As of 2011, its population was 3,080, in 548 households.
