= Shiupur, Jagdishpur =

Shiupur Shivpur
- Village
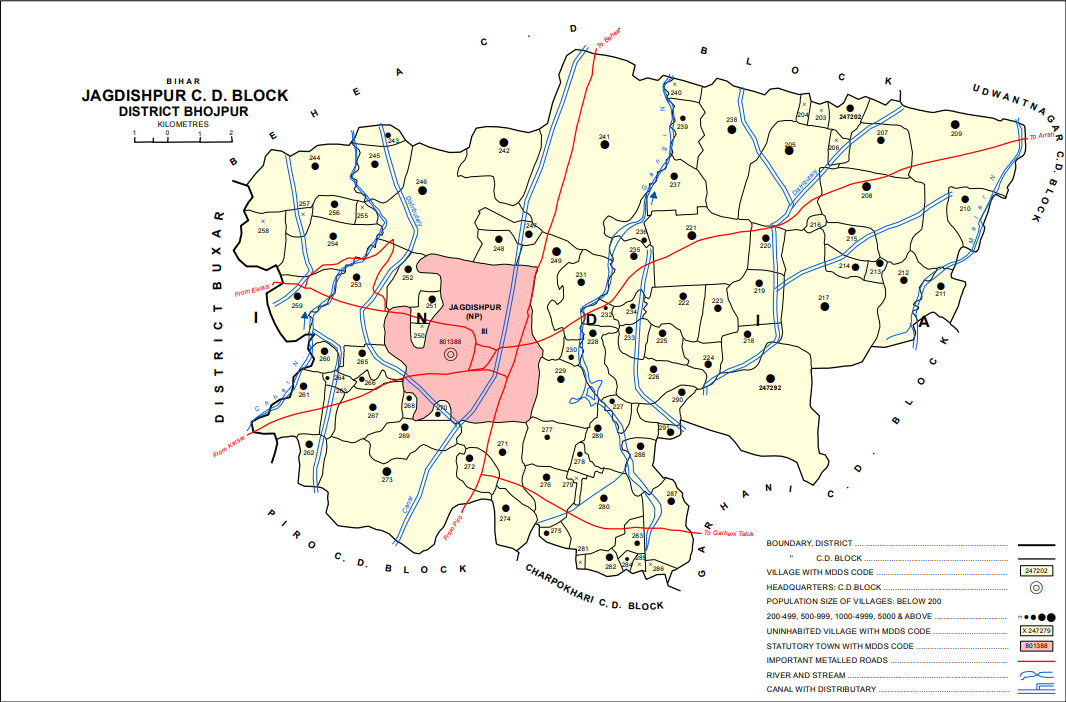
- Map of Shiupur (#253) in Jagdishpur block

- Location in Bihar, India Shiupur (India)
- Coordinates: 25.48035°N 84.3739°E
- Country: India
- State: Bihar
- District: Bhojpur

Area
  - Total: 0.631 km^{2} (0.244 sq mi)
- Elevation: 72 m (236 ft)

Population (2011)
  - Total: 3,760
  - Density: 5,960/km^{2} (15,400/sq mi)

Languages
  - Official: Bhojpuri, Hindi
- Time zone: UTC+5:30 (IST)

Shiupur, also spelled Shivpur, is a village in Jagdishpur block of Bhojpur district in Bihar, India. As of 2011, its population was 3,760, in 598 households. It is located northwest of the city of Jagdishpur.
