= Dalippur, Bhojpur =

Dalippur
- Village
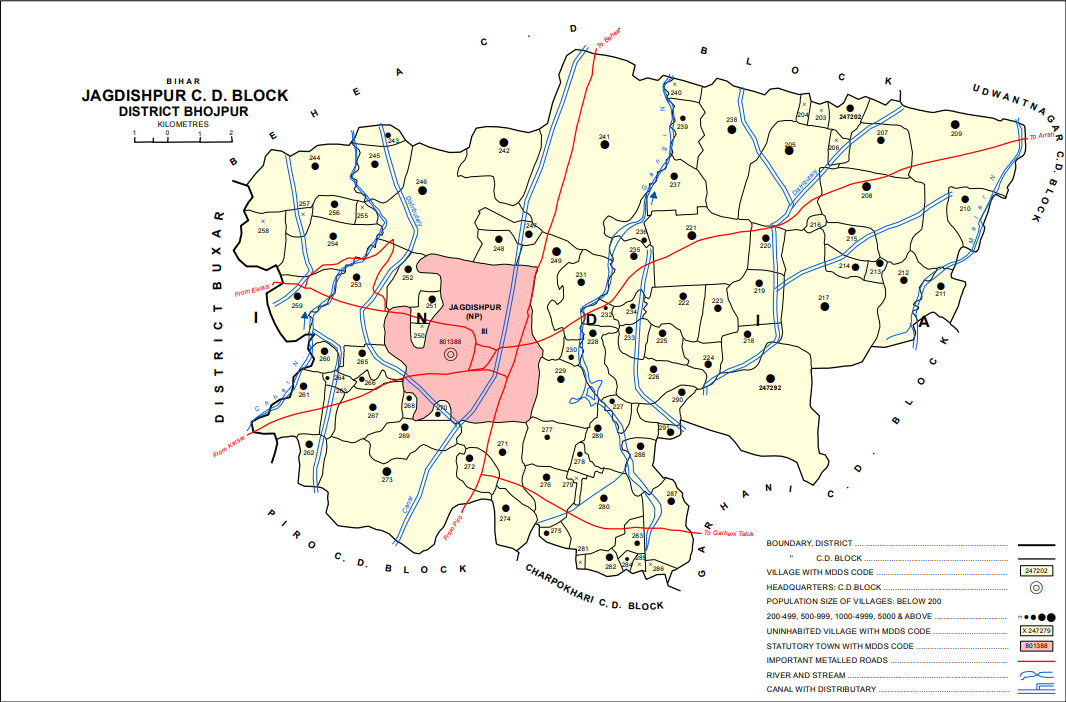
- Map of Dalippur (#273) in Jagdishpur block

- Location in Bihar, India Dalippur (India)
- Coordinates: 25.42215°N 84.39329°E
- Country: India
- State: Bihar
- District: Bhojpur

Area
  - Total: 1.127 km^{2} (0.435 sq mi)
- Elevation: 78 m (256 ft)

Population (2011)
  - Total: 8,921
  - Density: 7,916/km^{2} (20,500/sq mi)

Languages
  - Official: Bhojpuri, Hindi
- Time zone: UTC+5:30 (IST)

Dalippur is a large village in the southwestern part of Jagdishpur block in Bhojpur district, Bihar, India. As of 2011, its population was 8,921, in 1,483 households.
