= Kusaha, Bhojpur =

Kusaha Kusāha
- Village
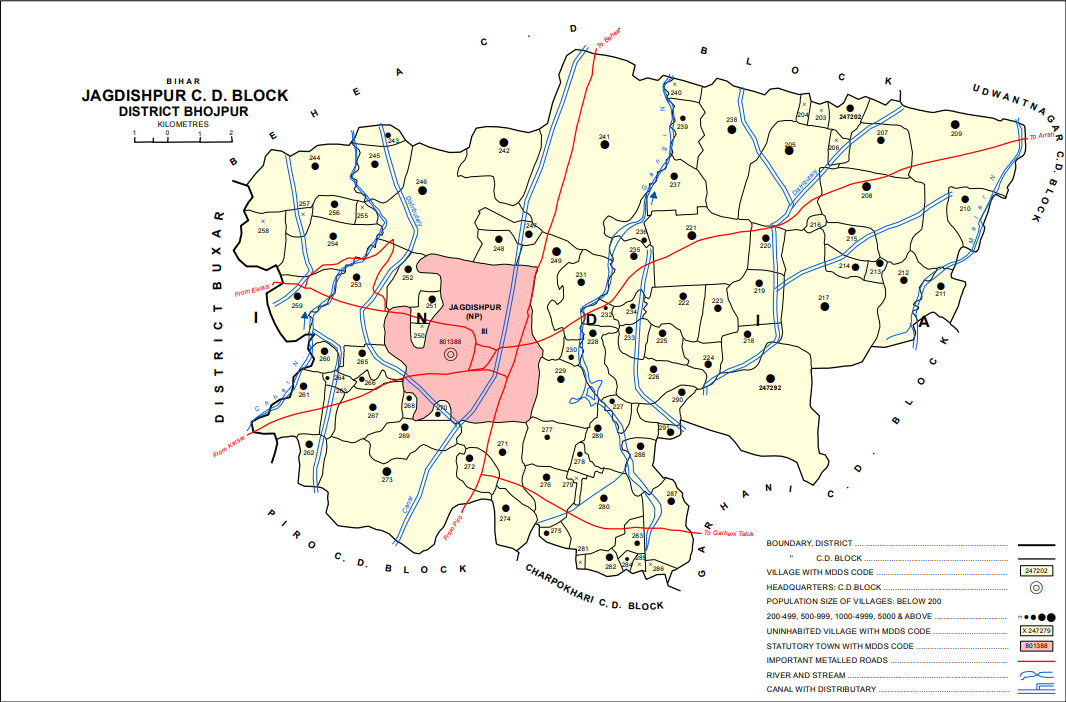
- Map of Kusaha (#266) in Jagdishpur block

- Location in Bihar, India Kusaha (India)
- Coordinates: 25.45722°N 84.38025°E
- Country: India
- State: Bihar
- District: Bhojpur

Area
  - Total: 0.047 km^{2} (0.018 sq mi)
- Elevation: 70 m (230 ft)

Population (2011)
  - Total: 692
  - Density: 15,000/km^{2} (38,000/sq mi)

Languages
  - Official: Bhojpuri, Hindi
- Time zone: UTC+5:30 (IST)

Kusaha is a small village in Jagdishpur block of Bhojpur district in Bihar, India. As of 2011, its population was 692, in 130 households. It is located southwest of the city of Jagdishpur.
