= Baluahi =

Village in Bihar, India

- Village
- Location in Bihar, India Baluahi (India)
- Coordinates: 25.450094°N 84.406433°E
- Country: India
- State: Bihar
- District: Bhojpur
- Elevation: 74 m (243 ft)

Languages
  - Official: Bhojpuri, Hindi
- Time zone: UTC+5:30 (IST)
- PIN: 802158
- Telephone code: 91-6181
- Vehicle registration: BR-03

Baluahi is a village in Bhojpur district in the state of Bihar, India, located 25 km from Arrah and 1 km from Jagdispur.It has total 124 families residing. Baluahi has population of 632 as per government records.

== Administration ==
Baluahi village is administrated by Mukhiya through its Gram Panchayat, who is elected representative of village as per constitution of India and Panchyati Raj Act.

Particulars	Total	Male	Female
Total No. of Houses	124		
Population	632	323	309

== History ==
Jagdispur has a very long historical background in the freedom movement of India. The King who ruled here was "Veer Kunwar Singh"(1856–1858), born in 1777, succeeded to throne in 1826, village "Dulaur" was most loveable village of Veer Kunwar Singh. This throne comprised two parganas and several Tulkas of Sahabad District. Late Hari Krishn singh family is one of the reputed family from this village.

== Climate ==
Baluahi lies in North-Eastern part of interior India, so its climate is greatly influenced in any season. The climate there is of moderately extreme type. The hot weather begins about the middle of March, when hot westerly winds begin to blow during the day. The temperature may increase to 43°C in summer. "Loo", which are local summer hot winds, blow at a speed of 30–40 km (25 mi). The months of April and May are extremely hot. In a normal year, the monsoon sets in by the third week of June and the rains continue intermittently through September or the early part of October. Winter begins from the month of November and lasts until the beginning of March. From April until the first break down of the monsoon, the district experiences occasional thunderstorms.

=== Rainfall ===
During monsoon, Baluahi gets about 80 to 105 cm average rainfall. Rains set in June accompanied by a fall in temperature and increase in humidity. The area experiences maximum rains during the months of July and August. Jagdispur gets easterly winds from June to September, which brings rains, from October the direction of the winds is reversed and westerly winds blow till May. There is slight rainfall in October, but November and December are quite dry. Some winter rain occurs in January and February.

=== Winter ===
Winter season begins from the month of November and lasts till the beginning of March. In Winters, the temperature may drop to 6°C, creating a thick layer of fog all over the city limiting visibility to 10 to 30 meters. In the winters of 2009–2010, Baluahi, Bhojpur, and Patna experienced extreme weather with a record decrease in temperature to 4°-5°C. The coldest month is January. It becomes necessary to wear heavy woolen clothes during winter.

== Irrigation ==
There are in Baluahi about 1 big and deep ponds which stores rain water and is used for irrigation and waste drainage and also a main thing sone canal is near by baluahi. The higher elevation of Baluahi than the surrounding towns is a concern since more people and the needs for irrigating fields calls for an increased demand on ground water. At one time a hand pump was all that was necessary to bring up ground water. Increasing the depth of ground water wells has not fulfilled all the increasing water use demands.
