= Hardiya, Jagdishpur =

Hardiya
- Village
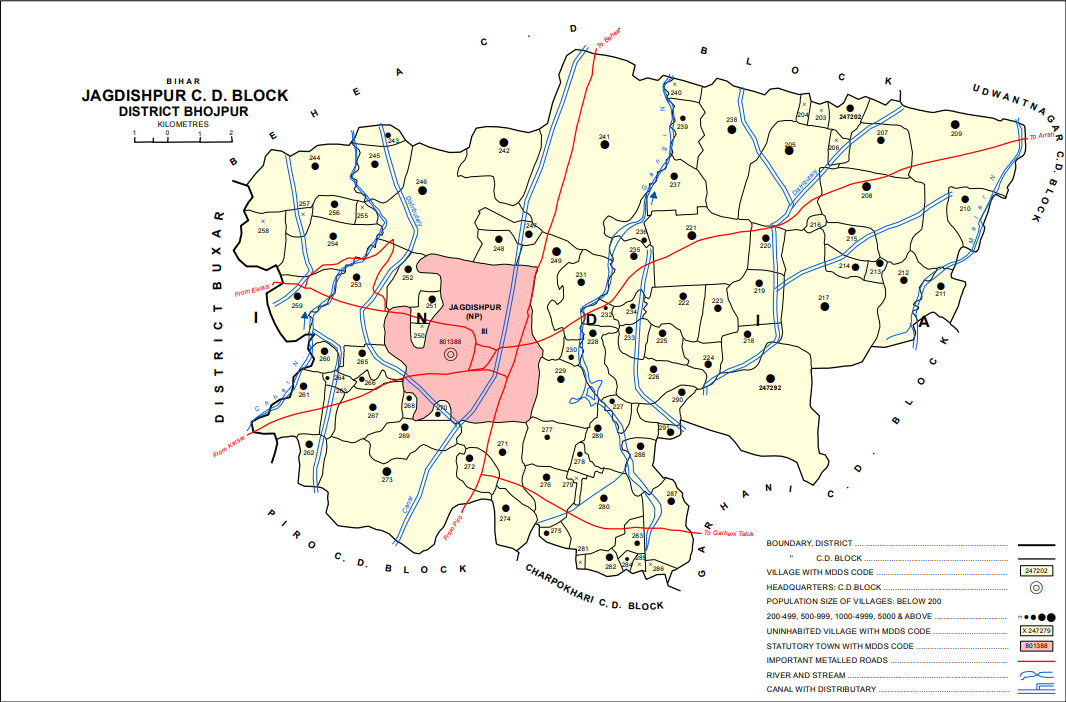
- Map showing Hardiya (#238) in Jagdishpur block

- Location in Bihar, India Hardiya (India)
- Coordinates: 25.53012°N 84.49608°E
- Country: India
- State: Bihar
- District: Bhojpur

Area
  - Total: 8.08 km^{2} (3.12 sq mi)
- Elevation: 70 m (230 ft)

Population (2011)
  - Total: 6,998
  - Density: 866/km^{2} (2,240/sq mi)

Languages
  - Official: Bhojpuri, Hindi
- Time zone: UTC+5:30 (IST)

Hardiya is a village in Jagdishpur block of Bhojpur district, Bihar, India. It is located in the northern part of the block, near the border with Bihiya block. As of 2011, its population was 6,998, in 1,006 households.
