= Kunai, Bhojpur =

Kunai
- Village
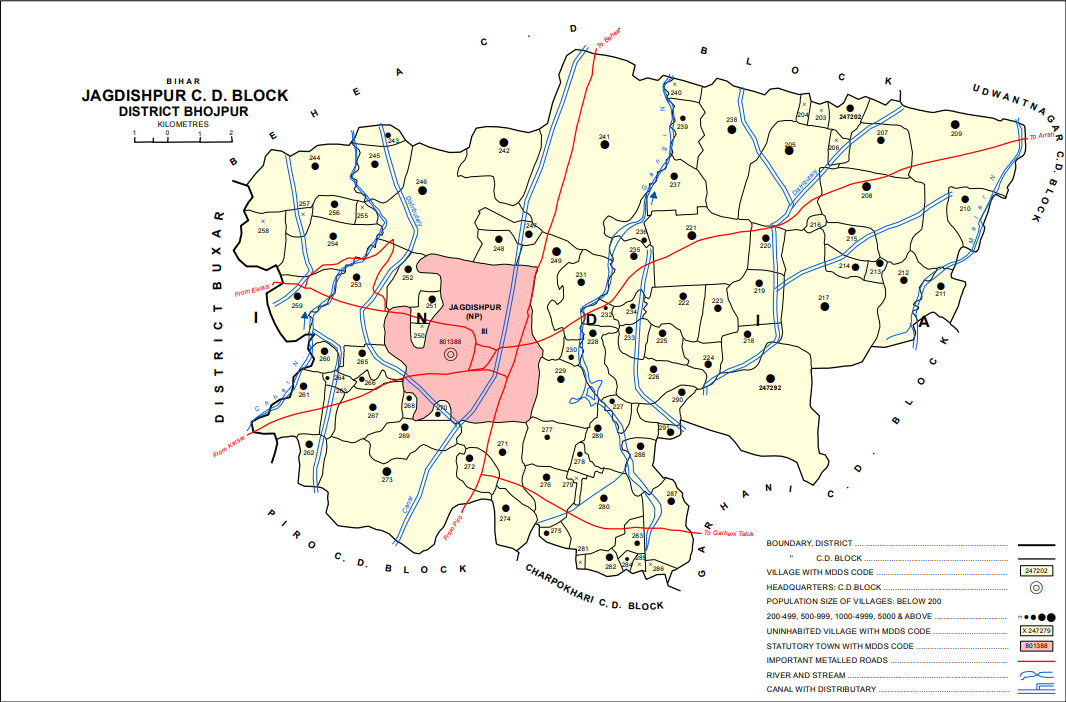
- Map of Kunai (#260) in Jagdishpur block

- Location in Bihar, India Kunai (India)
- Coordinates: 25.46958°N 84.36649°E
- Country: India
- State: Bihar
- District: Bhojpur

Area
  - Total: 0.086 km^{2} (0.033 sq mi)
- Elevation: 71 m (233 ft)

Population (2011)
  - Total: 1,407
  - Density: 16,000/km^{2} (42,000/sq mi)

Languages
  - Official: Bhojpuri, Hindi
- Time zone: UTC+5:30 (IST)

Kunai is a village in Jagdishpur block of Bhojpur district in Bihar, India. As of 2011, its population was 1,407, in 252 households.
