= Mahurahi, Bhojpur =

Mahurahi Mahurāhi
- Village
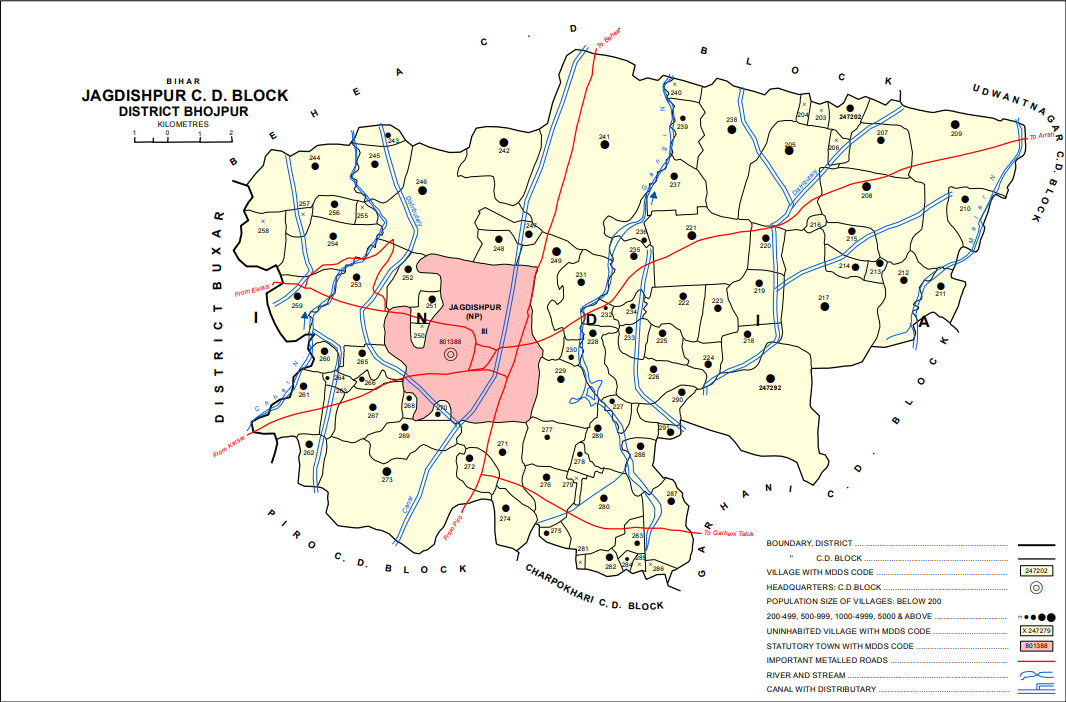
- Map of Mahurahi (#265) in Jagdishpur block

- Location in Bihar, India Mahurahi (India)
- Coordinates: 25.46605°N 84.38306°E
- Country: India
- State: Bihar
- District: Bhojpur

Area
  - Total: 0.177 km^{2} (0.068 sq mi)
- Elevation: 73 m (240 ft)

Population (2011)
  - Total: 2,072
  - Density: 11,700/km^{2} (30,300/sq mi)

Languages
  - Official: Bhojpuri, Hindi
- Time zone: UTC+5:30 (IST)

Mahurahi is a village in Jagdishpur block of Bhojpur district in Bihar, India. As of 2011, its population was 2,072, in 311 households.
