= Bahuwara, Bhojpur =

Bahuwara Bahuwāra
- Village
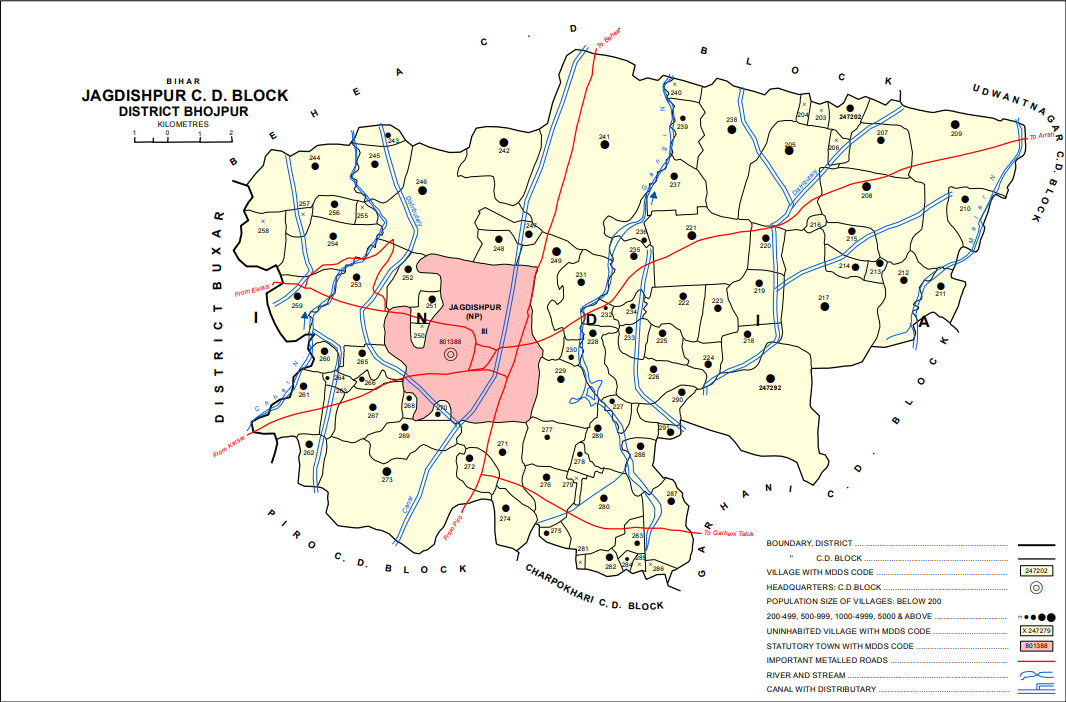
- Map of Bahuwara (#228) in Jagdishpur block

- Location in Bihar, India Bahuwara (India)
- Coordinates: 25.46026°N 84.45233°E
- Country: India
- State: Bihar
- District: Bhojpur

Area
  - Total: 0.142 km^{2} (0.055 sq mi)
- Elevation: 70 m (230 ft)

Population (2011)
  - Total: 1,462
  - Density: 10,300/km^{2} (26,700/sq mi)

Languages
  - Official: Bhojpuri, Hindi
- Time zone: UTC+5:30 (IST)

Bahuwara is a village in Jagdishpur block of Bhojpur district in Bihar, India. As of 2011, its population was 1,462, in 216 households. It is located southeast of the city of Jagdishpur, on the Chher Nadi stream.
