= Anharibag, Bhojpur =

Anharibag Anhārībāgh
- Village
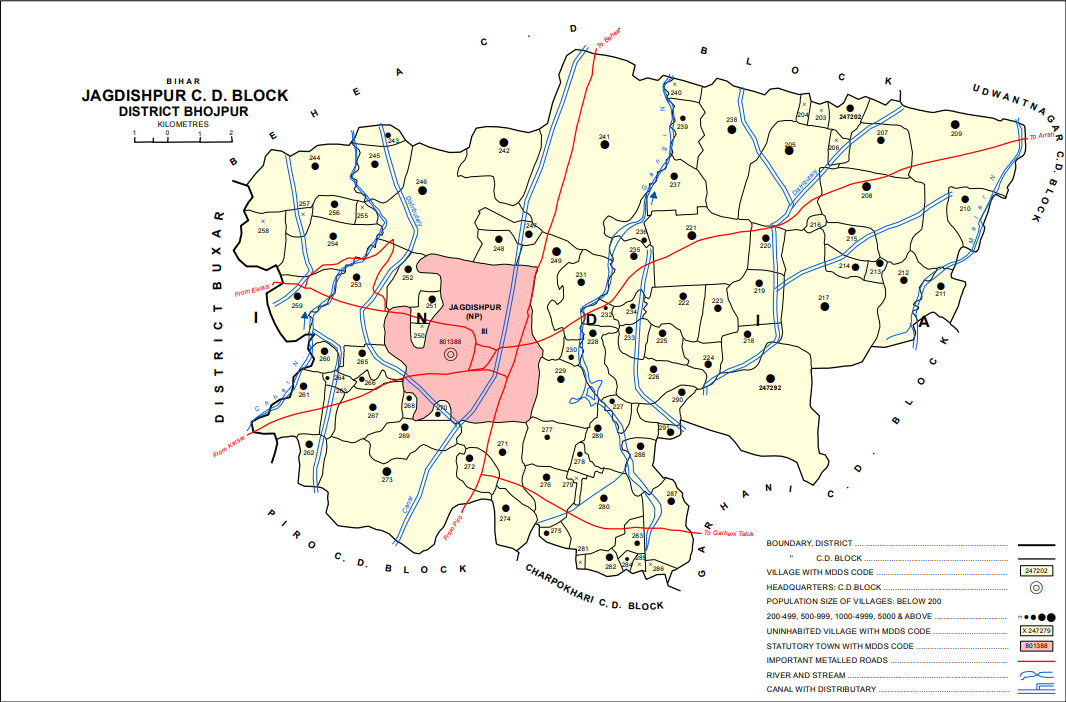
- Map of Anharibag (#248) in Jagdishpur block

- Location in Bihar, India Anharibag (India)
- Coordinates: 25.49521°N 84.42175°E
- Country: India
- State: Bihar
- District: Bhojpur

Area
  - Total: 0.121 km^{2} (0.047 sq mi)
- Elevation: 70 m (230 ft)

Population (2011)
  - Total: 1,287
  - Density: 10,600/km^{2} (27,500/sq mi)

Languages
  - Official: Bhojpuri, Hindi
- Time zone: UTC+5:30 (IST)

Anharibag, also spelled Anharibagh, is a village in Jagdishpur block of Bhojpur district in Bihar, India. As of 2011, its population was 1,287, in 213 households. It is located just north of the city of Jagdishpur.
