= Narayanpur, Jagdishpur =

Narayanpur Nārāyanpur
- Village
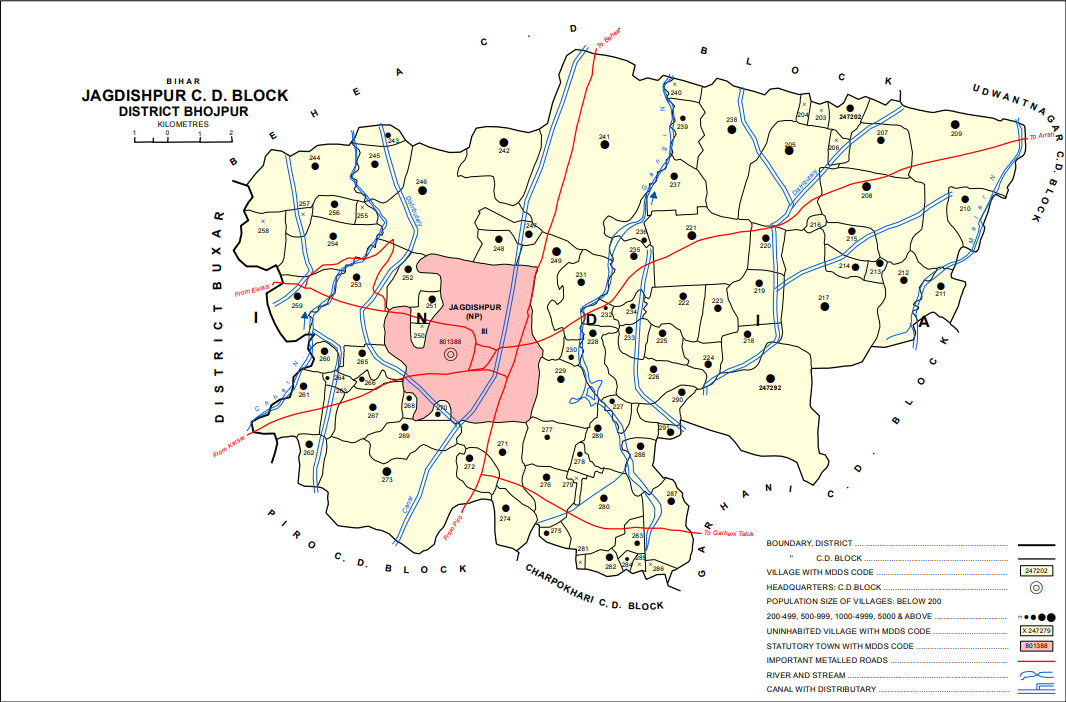
- Map of Narayanpur (#235) in Jagdishpur block

- Location in Bihar, India Narayanpur (India)
- Coordinates: 25.4868°N 84.46101°E
- Country: India
- State: Bihar
- District: Bhojpur

Area
  - Total: 0.234 km^{2} (0.090 sq mi)
- Elevation: 68 m (223 ft)

Population (2011)
  - Total: 2,125
  - Density: 9,080/km^{2} (23,500/sq mi)

Languages
  - Official: Bhojpuri, Hindi
- Time zone: UTC+5:30 (IST)

Narayanpur is a village in Jagdishpur block of Bhojpur district in Bihar, India. As of 2011, its population was 2,125, in 333 households.
