= Veer Kunwar Singh Museum =

Museum in Bihar, India

- Location: Jagdishpur, Bhojpur

Veer Kunwar Singh Museum is a museum in Jagdishpur near Arrah in Bhojpur district of Bihar. It is named after freedom fighter Kunwar Singh who played an important role in the Indian Rebellion of 1857. It has a good collection of artifacts related to India's struggle for independence.

== History ==
It was established in 1972 by converting his residence in to a museum.
