= Gurez, Bhojpur =

Gurez
- Village
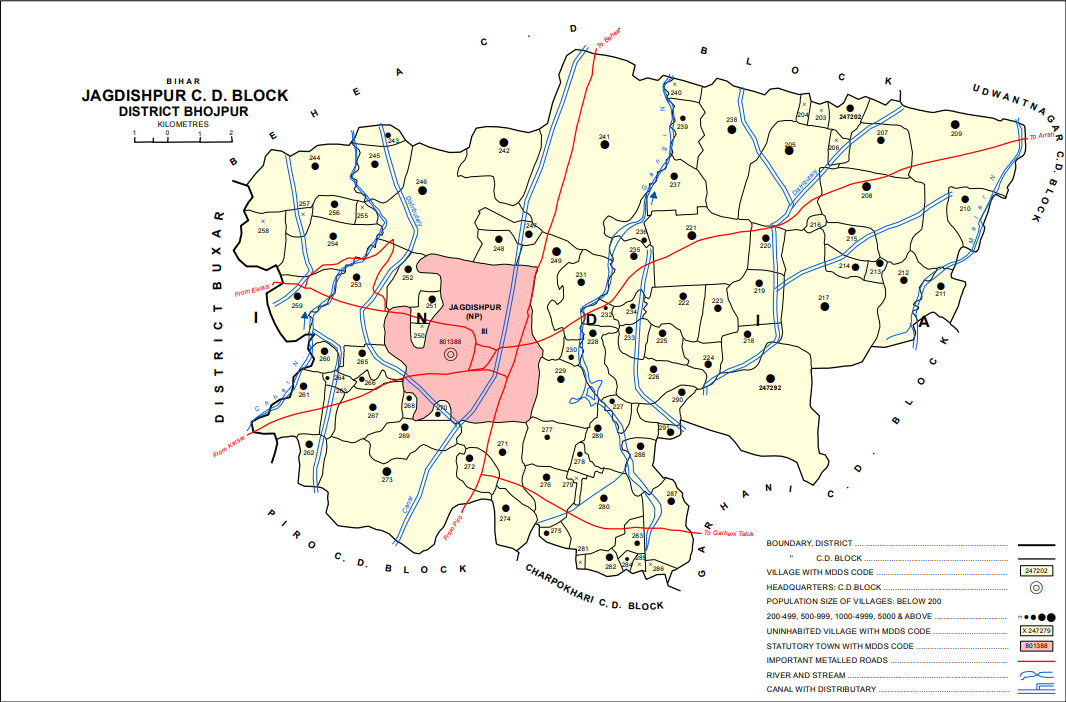
- Map of Gurez (#290) in Jagdishpur block

- Location in Bihar, India Gurez (India)
- Coordinates: 25.45075°N 84.47558°E
- Country: India
- State: Bihar
- District: Bhojpur

Area
  - Total: 0.121 km^{2} (0.047 sq mi)
- Elevation: 75 m (246 ft)

Population (2011)
  - Total: 1,189
  - Density: 9,830/km^{2} (25,500/sq mi)

Languages
  - Official: Bhojpuri, Hindi
- Time zone: UTC+5:30 (IST)

Gurez is a village in Jagdishpur block of Bhojpur district, Bihar, India. As of 2011, its population was 1,189, in 159 households.
