= Jagdishpur =

Nagar panchayat in Bihar, India

- Town
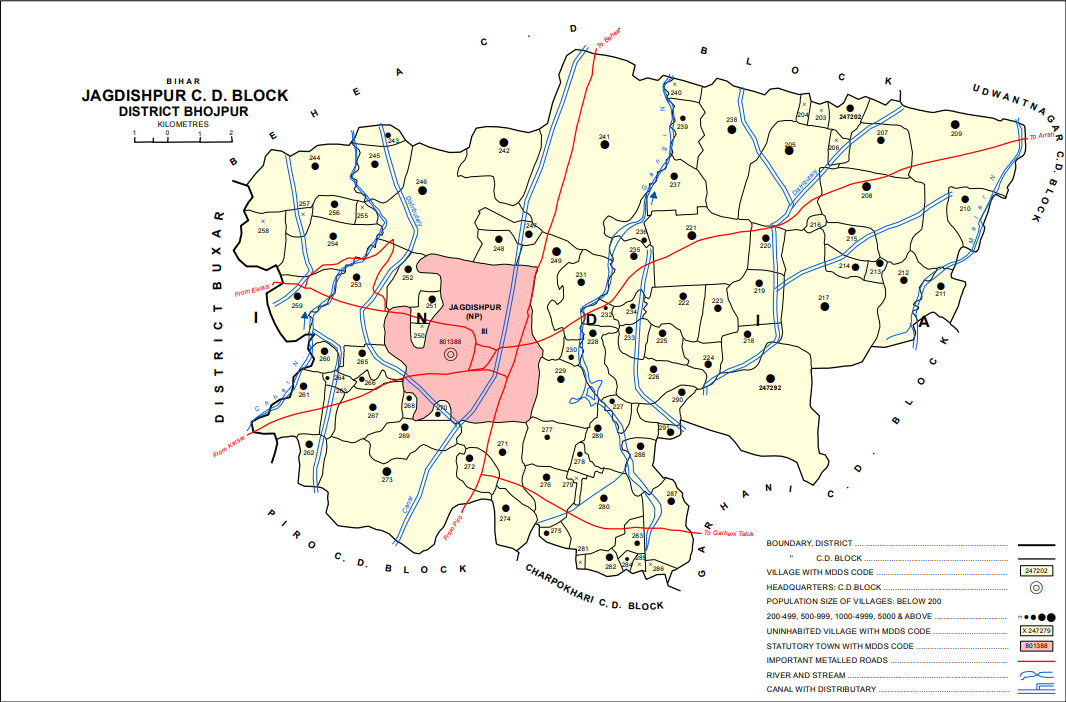
- Location in Jagdishpur block

- Location in Bihar, India Jagdishpur (India)
- Coordinates: 25°28′N 84°25′E
- Country: India
- State: Bihar
- District: Bhojpur
- Founder: Sujan Sahi

Government
  - Type: Town council

Area
  - Total: 25.63 km^{2} (9.90 sq mi)
- Elevation: 53 m (174 ft)

Population (2011)
  - Total: 32,447
  - Density: 1,266/km^{2} (3,279/sq mi)

Languages
  - Official: Hindi, Bhojpuri
- Time zone: UTC+5:30 (IST)
- PIN: 802 158
- Telephone code: 916181
- ISO 3166 code: IN-BR
- Vehicle registration: BR-03

Jagdishpur is a nagar panchayat town of the district Bhojpur of the eastern Indian state of Bihar. It was the capital of the eponymous Jagdishpur Raj ruled by Rajputs of the Ujjainiya clan. One of its rulers, Kunwar Singh, was a major figure in the Indian Rebellion of 1857, considered the leader of the rebellion in Bihar.

The sub-division occupies an area of 232.13 km^{2} (90 sq mi) and has a population of 263,959, while the town proper has a population of 32,447 (as of 2011).

== History ==
Jagdishpur's association with the Ujjainiya Rajputs predates the foundation of the eponymous state by at least two centuries. Gajpati Sahi, who defeated Sher Shah Suri, fortified Jagdishpur and made it his capital before 1539. After Sher Shah's victory over the Mughal emperor Humayun at the Battle of Chausa in 1539, he elevated Gajpati Sahi, who had fought in the battle, to the title of Raja. However, Dilpati Sahi, a rival claimant to the throne, later allied with the Mughal emperor Akbar against Gajpati Sahi. Mughal sources state that a Mughal army sacked Jagdishpur in 1575 and captured Gajpati Sahi. Dilpati Sahi took advantage of this and attacked in 1577; Gajpati Sahi was killed in the ensuing battle. Akbar granted Dilpati Sahi the title of Raja and made him a mansabdar. Dilpati Sahi moved his capital away from Jagdishpur to Bihiya, although Jagdishpur remained his main military stronghold.

Later, the Ujjainiya ruler Pratap Mal, who ascended the throne in 1621 and was a contemporary of Shah Jahan, moved away from Jagdishpur.

Jagdishpur became the capital of a Rajput zamindari estate in 1702 by Sujan Sahi, an Ujjainiya Rajput who claimed descent from the earlier Paramara dynasty. Sujan Sahi's son and successor, Udwant Singh, expanded the borders of the estate by conquering neighbouring towns and villages. The governor of Bihar, Fakhr ud-Dawla, attempted to intervene, but Udwant Singh defeated the troops he sent.

Kunwar Singh brought a "new era of peace and prosperity, splendour and magnificence" to Jagdishpur. He renovated its fort and then started construction on a temple dedicated to Shiva, although this temple was never completed. He established markets and had many wells and reservoirs dug. Under his reign, Jagdishpur came to host various festivals and melās (fairs). In particular, the Shivratri festival was associated with a large melā that Kunwar Singh made mandatory for local merchants to attend.

== Demographics ==
Historical population
Year	Pop.	±%
1951	11,322	—
1961	11,840	+4.6%
1971	14,739	+24.5%
1981	17,621	+19.6%
1991	21,384	+21.4%
2001	28,085	+31.3%
2011	32,447	+15.5%
Source: 2011 Census of India

According to the 2011 Census, the town of Jagdishpur had a population of 32,447, up from 28,085 in 2001. Of this, 75.2% were Hindus and 24.2% were Muslims, with all other religious groups accounting for the remaining 0.6%. The local literacy rate was 68.5%, which was the lowest in Bhojpur. 11.6% of the population was employed as cultivators, 26.7% as agricultural labourers, 6.9% as household industry workers, and 54.8% as other workers. The 11.6% of cultivators was the largest in Bhojpur. It is 29 KM from the Ara Railway Station.

The sub-district of Jagdishpur contained 79 villages in 2011, all of which had access to clean drinking water, 69 of which had schools, 30 of which had medical facilities, 24 of which had post offices, 56 of which had transport communications (bus, rail, or navigable waterways), 6 of which had banks, 18 of which had agricultural credit societies, 55 of which had pucca roads, and 35 of which had electricity. 81.5% of the total land area in Jagdishpur district was under cultivation, and 83% of the land under cultivation was irrigated.

576 people in the town Jagdishpur lived in slums, or 1.78% of the total population, which was the lowest in Bhojpur. There are two slums: Harijan Tola (Ward No. 4, population 300) and Chamar Tola (Ward No. 18, population 276).

== Administration ==
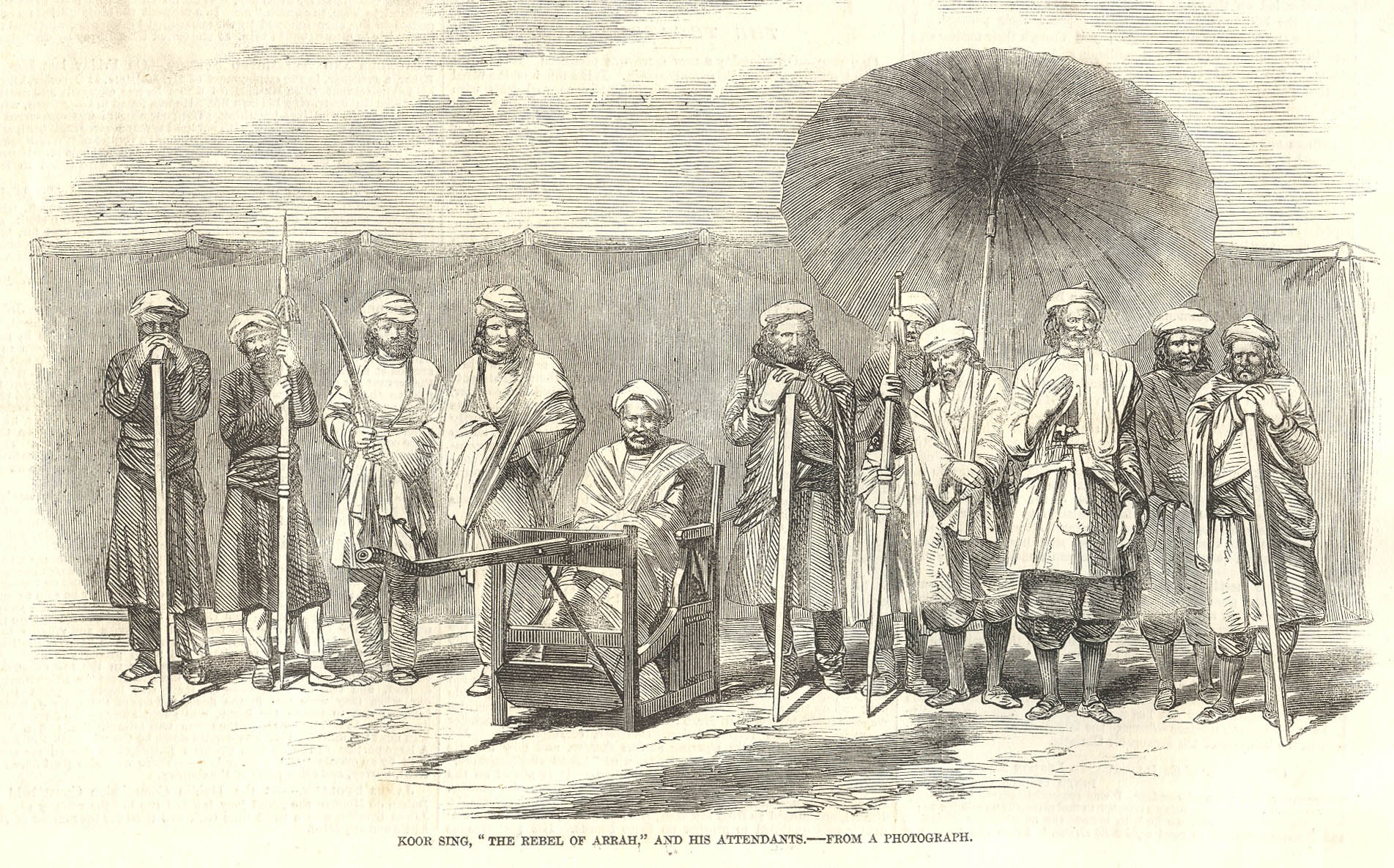
Kunwar Singh with his attendants during Revolt of 1857.

The Jagdishpur sub-division (Tehsil) is headed by an IAS or state Civil service officer of the rank of Sub Divisional Magistrate (SDM).

=== Blocks ===
The Jagdishpur Tehsil is divided into 3 Blocks, each headed by a Block Development Officer (BDO). List of Blocks is as follows:

1. Jagdishpur
2. Behea
3. Shahpur

== List of villages ==
Jagdishpur block contains the following 91 villages: (GP is Gram Panchayat).

Village name	Total land area (hectares)	Population (in 2011)
Mathurapur	127	1,984
Misrauliya	49	0
Dubhar	38	0
Bimawan (GP)	728	8,487
Lahijohar	56	0
Tulsi	295	1,358
Harigaon (GP)	648	6,638
Kaunra (GP)	1,137	10,466
Geyanpura	205	1,210
Sultanpur	173	1,686
Asodhan	335	2,363
Bankat	50	1,018
Sundara	106	1,049
Dhaka Karam	152	1,581
Saniya Barahta	34	56
Barnaon (GP)	946	9,491
Kahen	195	2,562
Kusamha	253	2,534
Isanri	191	1,719
Babhniyawan (GP)	711	9,945
Hathpokhar	238	2,633
Tikthi	171	1,629
Manjhupur	119	1,040
Parasiya (GP)	123	2,433
Masurhi	372	3,426
Asodhar	65	861
Bahuwara	142	1,462
Siyaruwa (GP)	358	3,146
Mungaul	45	504
Barad Parwa	330	4,327
Dulaur	113	345
Diliya	79	1,218
Sondhi	94	712
Narayanpur	234	2,125
Ujiyarpur	149	971
Bhatauli	224	1,241
Hardiya (GP)	808	6,998
Panapur	163	619
Afzalpur	68	0
Danwan (GP)	2,050	14,523
Chakwa (GP)	419	12,814
Gangadhar Dehri	91	885
Uttardaha (GP)	539	3,645
Kataibojh	250	2,884
Hetampur (GP)	910	7,575
Rangarua	155	1,417
Anharibag	121	1,287
Utarwari Jangal Mahal (GP)	0	6,330
Bara Pokhar	40	0
Sonbarsa	64	1,244
Dihri	166	1,984
Shiupur (GP)	631	3,760
Araila	405	4,893
Kinnu Dehri	51	0
Mannu Dehri	88	1,964
Jamui Horil	79	0
Jamui Khanr	222	0
Deorar	249	3,080
Kunai	86	1,407
Kesari	307	2,226
Harna Tanr	110	1,528
Mangitpur	76	13
Dilia	42	445
Mahurahi	177	2,072
Kusaha	47	692
Dhangain	307	1,710
Bachri	42	610
Basauna (GP)	304	2,670
Baluwanhi	24	632
Bichla Jangal Mahal (GP)	0	3,677
Tenduni	143	2,912
Dalippur (GP)	1,127	8,921
Korhwa	179	1,414
Manhtati	50	575
Bharsara	241	2,624
Neur Pokhar	237	999
Repura	55	551
Khutaha	31	0
Kakila (GP)	419	3,279
Bariar Patti	17	0
Pipra	92	1,012
Paliya	80	693
Lakhanpura	14	447
Paliya Chak	31	0
Kali Bali	43	0
Diul	361	2,406
Ugna	144	2,672
Mangura	276	1,686
Gurez	121	1,189
Bairahi	43	1,023
Aer	1,133	13,305

== See also ==
- Veer Kunwar Singh Museum
