= List of people from Arrah =

This is a list of notable residents of Arrah, Bhojpur, Bihar, India.

== Nationalist and independence activists ==
- Babu Amar Singh
- Hare Krishna Singh
- Veer Kunwar Singh

== Journalist ==
- Anjana Om Kashyap

== Writers and scholars ==
- Acharya Shivpujan Sahay, writer
- Amitava Kumar, Journalist and writer
- Anil Sinha, IPS
- Avinash Chandra Vidyarthi, Bhojpuri Writer
- Mithileshwar, writer
- Muni Lall, IPS
- Sachchidananda Sinha, lawyer and journalist
- Shashi Bhushan Sahai, IPS
- Kapil Muni Tiwary, Linguist and Professor of English in Yamen

== Politicians ==
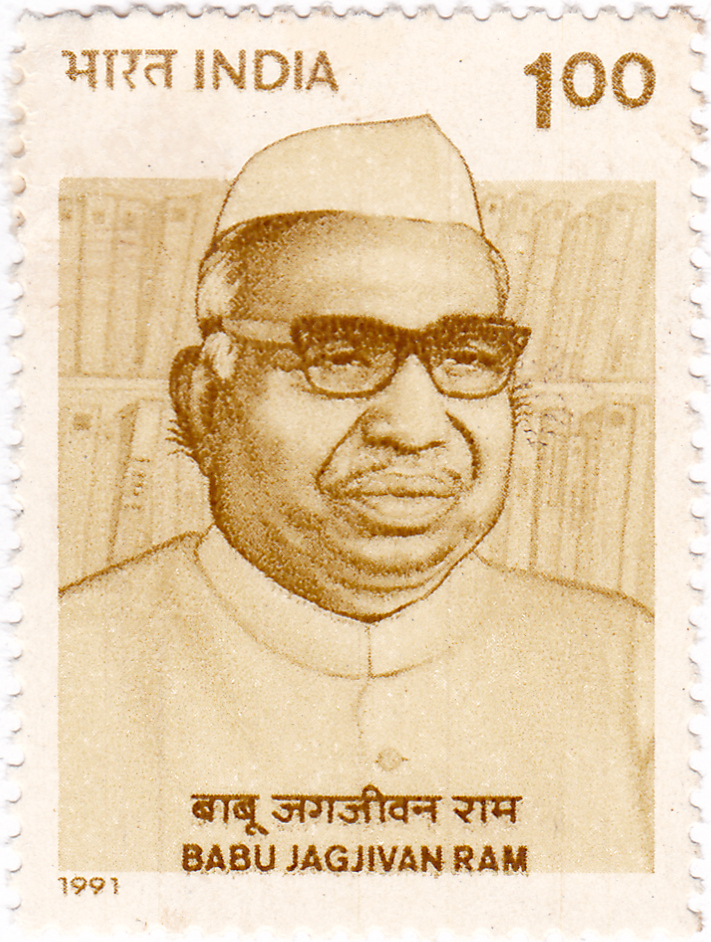
Jagjivan Ram 1991 stamp of India.jpg

- Jagjivan Ram, 4th deputy Prime Minister of India
- Meira Kumar, Former Lok Sabha Speaker
- Bindeshwari Dubey, Chief Minister of Bihar
- Ram Subhag Singh, He was the leader of India's first opposition in the Lok Sabha
- Shailendra Nath Shrivastava Former MP of Patna
- Ram Vishnun Singh, Member of Legislative Assembly
- Amrendra Pratap Singh, Member of Legislative Assembly
- Dinesh Kumar Singh, Member of Legislative Assembly
- Shri Bhagwan Singh Kushwaha, Former Rural Development Minister of Bihar
- Ravindra Kishore Sinha, Former Rajya Sabha MP, Indian Billionaire
- Kamla Persad-Bissessar, Trinidadian Prime Minister
- Sarran Teelucksingh, Trinidadian politician
- Seewoosagur Ramgoolam, Prime Minister of Mauritius
- Navin Ramgoolam, Former Prime Minister of Mauritius (grandfather from Shahabad)
- Anerood Jugnauth, Former Prime Minister of Mauritius (grandfather is from Shahabad)
- Pravind Jugnauth, Prime Minister of Mauritius

== Entertainment ==
- Pawan Singh, Bhojpuri actor and singer
- S. H. Bihari, lyricist
- Satyakam Anand, actor
- Vishal Aditya Singh, actor and model
- Neeraj Pandey, Film Director
- Vinay Pathak, Film actor
- Kumar Varun, Stand-up Comedian

== Sports ==
- Rohit Raj, cricketer
