= List of villages in Arrah block =

The Arrah block in Bhojpur district, Bihar, India, contains the following 115 villages:

Village name	Total land area (hectares)	Population (in 2011)
Mahadewa(Unsurveyed)		
Gongsar	200	1700
Sundarpur Barja	202	4,951
Rampur	142	0
Pipra	118	1,814
Ijri	59	5,455
Baghakol	126	1,324
Teksemar	76	523
Salempur	360	0
Tetaria	93	1,304
Behra	234	2,087
Parkhotampur	129	1,103
Bakharia	31	0
Sakatpura	36	0
Mainpura	52	1,355
Sukulpur	54	2,120
Dariapur	208	2,268
Sarsiwan	82	1,705
Basantpur	310	3,323
Basantpur	105	0
Bela	166	2,519
Rampur Mathia	85	769
Gheghta	40	1,386
Makhampur Bara	258	3,023
Rokaiya Chak	36	0
Bhakura	335	4,835
Alipur	306	2,888
Jamira	849	13,891
Santpur	87	0
Piprahiya	70	2,465
Hasanpura	133	2,863
Bhusahula	82	1,387
Gothahula	295	5,548
Karwa	106	2,841
Sonadia	185	5,262
Nayagaon	61	361
Sonadia	91	2,767
Chatarsainpur	126	3,049
Alimullah Chak	29	0
Ramsara Chandar Chur	42	0
Daulatpur	87	4,416
Lachhmanpur	215	1,859
Mirza Beg	25	483
Mathaulia	85	1,521
Basantpur	116	2,815
Dhauandhua	51	3,601
Balua	0	2,457
Sobhi Dumra	184	2,742
Sarangpur	285	2,805
Nirmalpur	63	1,089
Saidpur	63	1,479
Bahira Chak	57	0
Bheldumra	117	1,424
Makhdumpur Dumra	168	2,988
Garaiyan	147	2
Jadopur	91	590
Piraunta	184	3,887
Pipra	715	2,392
Chamukha	64	310
Nagopur	55	713
Mathurapur	115	0
Babhnauli	43	1,327
Sonadia	417	2,743
Tulshipur	72	0
Ratanpur	106	2,238
Ratan Dularpur	141	1,568
Ganghar	362	5,324
Ramdih Chhapra	69	789
Bakhria	191	1,139
Khushhalpur	82	1,155
Balua	122	2,031
Mahuli	532	4,166
Kurwa	14	0
Karari	329	4,679
Mohanpur	53	861
Deorhi	35	838
Karra	302	2,058
Bakula	52	0
Bairampur	45	0
Bhadea	153	1,821
Gazipur	98	0
Duraundha	143	1,458
Dhobaha	149	1,556
Belghat	94	1,073
Jura	104	1,066
Amma	63	467
Ghoradei	99	1,496
Ganauli	58	1,437
Udaipur	28	742
Singhi Tola	71	813
Baghipakar	188	3,070
Agarsanda	146	2,659
Dharampura	130	1,267
Tenua	105	712
Paut	266	2,122
Pipra	94	991
Basmanpur	66	727
Semaria	50	1,312
Milki	27	1,127
Dhamar	288	7,279
Chanda	346	2,154
Amarpur Marwatia	130	2,565
Khajuria	372	3,777
Bara	64	1,019
Kunria	100	1,135
Pathanpur	122	1,741
Perhap	1300	3500
Misraulia	41	0
Kaushik Dularpur	50	478
Chit Kundi	84	1,449
Durg Tola	50	500
Mahazi Dokti (Unsurveyed)	0	0
Dokti (Unsurveyed)	0	0
Dharampura (Unsurveyed)	0	0
Horlahi (Unsurveyed)	0	0
Singhai (Unsurveyed)	0	0
Dalan Chhapra (Unsurveyed)	0	0
