= 1957 Bihar Legislative Assembly election =

Election in India

← 1952	25 February 1957	1962 →

All 318 seats in the Bihar Legislative Assembly 159 seats needed for a majority
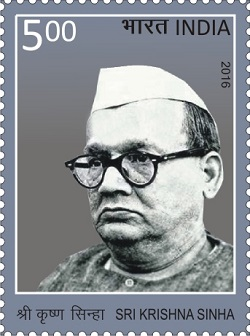
	Majority party	Minority party
Leader	Shri Krishna Sinha
Party	INC	JKP
Seats won	210	31
Seat change	▼29	▼1
Popular vote	44,55,425	7,49,021
Percentage	42.09%	7.08%
Swing	▲0.71%	▼0.93%
Chief Minister before election
Shri Krishna Sinha
INC
Elected Chief Minister
Shri Krishna Sinha
INC

Elections to the Bihar Legislative Assembly were held on 25 February 1957. 1393 candidates contested for the 264 constituencies in the Assembly. There were 54 two-member constituencies and 210 single-member constituencies.

== State Reorganization ==
Bihar was reduced slightly by the transfer of minor territories to West Bengal in 1956 under States Reorganisation Act, 1956. Hence the constituencies were reduced from 330 in 1951 to 318 in 1957 elections.

== Results ==
Summary of results of the 1957 Bihar Legislative Assembly election
Party	Flag	Seats Contested	Won	Net change in seats	% of Seats	Votes	Vote %	Change in vote %
Indian National Congress		312	210	▼29	66.04	44,55,425	42.09	▲0.71
Praja Socialist Party		222	31	New	9.75	16,94,974	16.01	New
Chota Nagpur Santhal Parganas Janata Party		125	23	▲12	7.23	8,29,195	7.83	▲4.67
Jharkhand Party		71	31	▼1	9.75	7,49,021	7.08	▼0.93
Communist Party of India		60	7	▲7	2.20	5,45,577	5.15	▲4.01
Independent		572	16	▲11	5.03	21,81,180	20.61	N/A
		Total seats	318 (▼12)	Voters	2,56,21,144	Turnout	1,05,85,422 (41.32%)	

== Elected members ==
Constituency	Reserved for (SC/ST/None)	Member	Party
Dhanaha	None	Jogendra Prasad	Independent
Bagaha	SC	Narsingh Baitha	Indian National Congress
Bagaha	SC	Kedar Pandey	Indian National Congress
Shikarpur	None	Sinheshwar Pd. Verma	Praja Socialist Party
Sikta	None	Fazlur Rahman	Indian National Congress
Lauria	None	Subh Narayan Prasad	Indian National Congress
Chanpatia	None	Ketaki Devi	Indian National Congress
Bettiah	SC	Jagannath Pd. Swatantra	Indian National Congress
Bettiah	SC	Jaya Narayan Prasad	Indian National Congress
Raxaul	None	Rahda Pandey	Indian National Congress
Adapur	None	Brajnandan Sharma	Independent
Motihari	SC	Bigoo Ram	Indian National Congress
Motihari	SC	Shakuntala Devi	Indian National Congress
Ghorasahan	None	Mangal Pd. Yadav	Indian National Congress
Dhaka	None	Masoodur Rahman	Indian National Congress
Patahi	None	Bibhishan Kumar	Indian National Congress
Madhuban	None	Rooplal Rai	Independent
Kesaria	None	Prabhawati Gupta	Indian National Congress
Pipra	None	Ganga Nath Mishra	Communist Party of India
Harsidhi	None	Parabati Devi	Indian National Congress
Govindganj	None	Dhrub Narain Mani Tripathi	Indian National Congress
Barauli	None	Abdul Ghafoor	Indian National Congress
Gopalganj	None	Kamla Rai	Indian National Congress
Kuchaikot	None	Vachaspati Sharma	Indian National Congress
Bhore	SC	Chandrika Ram	Indian National Congress
Bhore	SC	Rambali Pandey	Praja Socialist Party
Mirganj	None	Janardan Sinha	Indian National Congress
Siwan	None	Gadadhar Pd. Shrivastava	Indian National Congress
Ziradei	None	Zawar Hussain	Indian National Congress
Darauli	SC	Rajendra Pd. Singh	Chota Nagpur Santhal Parganas Janata Party
Darauli	SC	Basawan Ram	Indian National Congress
Raghunathpur	None	Ram Deo Sinha	Praja Socialist Party
Manjhi	None	Girish Tewari	Indian National Congress
Maharajganj	None	Anusuya	Indian National Congress
Basantpur West	None	Krishna Kant Singh	Indian National Congress
Basantpur East	None	Sabhapati Sinha	Praja Socialist Party
Barharia	None	Quamrul Haque	Indian National Congress
Baikunthpur	None	Trivikram Deo Narayan Singh	Independent
Mashrakh North	None	Mritunjoy Singh	Praja Socialist Party
Mashrakh South	None	Krishna Madhav Prasad Sinha	Indian National Congress
Marhaura	None	Devi Laljee	Praja Socialist Party
Baniapur	None	Uma Pandey	Indian National Congress
Chapra	SC	Jaglal Chaudhary	Indian National Congress
Chapra	SC	Prabhunath Singh	Indian National Congress
Garkha	None	Ram Jaipal Singh Yadav	Praja Socialist Party
Parsa	None	Daroga Prasad Rai	Indian National Congress
Sonepur	None	Ram Binod Singh	Independent
Hajipur	None	Deep Narayan Singh	Indian National Congress
Raghopur	None	Haribans Narayan Sinha	Indian National Congress
Mahnar	None	Banarsi Devi	Indian National Congress
Patepur	None	Manzur Ahsan Ajazi	Indian National Congress
Mahua	SC	Sheonandan Ram	Indian National Congress
Mahua	SC	Bindeshwari Pd. Verma	Indian National Congress
Lalganj South	None	Birchand Patel	Indian National Congress
Lalganj North	None	Laliteshwar Pd. Shahi	Indian National Congress
Paru	SC	Nawal Kishore Sinha	Indian National Congress
Paru	SC	Chandu Ram	Indian National Congress
Baruraj	None	Ram Chandra Pd. Shahi	Indian National Congress
Kanti	None	Jamuna Pd. Tripathi	Indian National Congress
Sakra	SC	Ramgulam Chaudhary	Indian National Congress
Sakra	SC	Kapildeo Narain Sinha	Indian National Congress
Muzaffarpur	None	Mahamaya Pd. Sinha	Praja Socialist Party
Muzaffarpur Muffasil	None	Ramjanam Ojha	Praja Socialist Party
Katra South	None	Niteshwar Pd. Sinha	Indian National Congress
Katra North	None	Ram Briksha Benipuri	Praja Socialist Party
Minapur	None	Janak Singh	Indian National Congress
Runisaidpur	None	Tribeni Pd. Singh	Indian National Congress
Belsand	None	Ramanand Singh	Praja Socialist Party
Sheohar	SC	Thakur Girjanandan Singh	Independent
Sheohar	SC	Ram Saroop Ram	Independent
Sitamarhi South	None	Ram Sewak Saran	Praja Socialist Party
Sitamarhi North	None	Kuldip Narayan Yadav	Indian National Congress
Sonbarsa	None	Singheshwar Rai	Independent
Sursand	None	Maheshwar Pd. Narain Sinha	Indian National Congress
Pupri North	None	Sudama Choudhry	Indian National Congress
Pupri South	None	Devendra Jha	Praja Socialist Party
Jale	None	Sheikh Tahir Hussain	Indian National Congress
Benipatti West	None	Chhote Pd. Singh	Indian National Congress
Benipatti East	None	Subhchandra Mishra	Indian National Congress
Jainagar	SC	Ramkrishan Mahto	Indian National Congress
Jainagar	SC	Deo Narayan Yadav	Indian National Congress
Khajauli	None	Sakoor Ahmed	Indian National Congress
Madhubani West	None	Ramakant Jha	Praja Socialist Party
Madhubani East	None	Arjun Prasad Singh	Indian National Congress
Jhanjharpur	None	Deochandra Jha	Indian National Congress
Laukaha	None	Ramdulari Shastri	Indian National Congress
Phulparas	None	Rashik Lal Yadav	Indian National Congress
Madaipur	None	Radhanandan Jha	Indian National Congress
Biraul	None	Jainarain Jha Vineet	Indian National Congress
Bahera South	None	Krishna Devi	Indian National Congress
Bahera East	None	Mahes Kant Sharma	Indian National Congress
Bahera West	None	Harinath Mishra	Indian National Congress
Darbhanga North	None	Hirdai Narain Choudhry	Indian National Congress
Darbhanga Central	None	Seikh Sayeedul Haque	Indian National Congress
Darbhanga South	SC	Janki Raman Pd. Mishra	Indian National Congress
Darbhanga South	SC	Babuyelal Mahto	Indian National Congress
Samastipur West	None	Jadunandan Sahay	Indian National Congress
Samastipur East	None	Sahdeo Mahato	Indian National Congress
Dalsinghsarai	SC	Baleshwar Ram	Indian National Congress
Dalsinghsarai	SC	Mishri Singh	Indian National Congress
Mohiuddinagar	None	Shanti Devi	Indian National Congress
Tajpur	None	Karpoori Thakur	Praja Socialist Party
Warisnagar West	None	Ram Sukumari Devi	Indian National Congress
Warisnagar East	None	Sunder Singh	Indian National Congress
Rosera	None	Mahabir Raut	Indian National Congress
Singhia	SC	Shyam Kumari	Indian National Congress
Singhia	SC	Braj Mohan Pd. Singh	Indian National Congress
Supaul	None	Parmeshwar Kumar	Praja Socialist Party
Kishanpur	None	Baidhyanath Mehta	Indian National Congress
Pratapganj	None	Khub Lal Mahto	Indian National Congress
Tribeniganj	SC	Tulmohan Ram	Indian National Congress
Tribeniganj	SC	Yogeshwar Jha	Indian National Congress
Murliganj	None	Shivnandan Prasad Mandal	Indian National Congress
Madhipura	None	Bhupendra Narayan Mandal	Independent
Saharsa	None	Vishweshvari Devi	Indian National Congress
Sonbarsa	SC	Jageshwar Hajra	Indian National Congress
Sonbarsa	SC	Upendra Narain Singh	Indian National Congress
Alamnagar	None	Yadunandan Jha	Indian National Congress
Raniganj	None	Ram Narayan Mandal	Indian National Congress
Forbesganj	SC	Shital Pd. Gupta	Indian National Congress
Forbesganj	SC	Dumar Lal Baitha	Indian National Congress
Araria	None	Ziaur Rehman	Indian National Congress
Palasi	None	Shanti Devi	Indian National Congress
Bahadurganj	None	Lakhan Lal Kapoor	Praja Socialist Party
Kishanganj	None	Abdul Haiyat	Indian National Congress
Amaur	None	Mohammad Ismail	Independent
Purnea	None	Kamaldeo Narayan Sinha	Indian National Congress
Dhamdaha	SC	Bhola Paswan Shastri	Indian National Congress
Dhamdaha	SC	Laxmi Narayan Sudhansu	Indian National Congress
Rupauli	None	Braj Bihari Singh	Indian National Congress
Barari	None	Basudeo Pd. Singh	Indian National Congress
Manihari	None	Parwati Debi	Indian National Congress
Katihar	SC	Sukhdeo Narayan Sinha	Indian National Congress
Katihar	SC	Babulal Manjhi	Indian National Congress
Kadwa	None	Mohiuddin Mokhtar	Indian National Congress
Baisi	None	Abul Ahmad Mohammad Noor	Indian National Congress
Rajmahal	None	Binodanand Jha	Indian National Congress
Borio	None	Jetha Kisku	Jharkhand Party
Barhait	None	Babulal Tudu	Jharkhand Party
Littipara	None	Ramcharan Kisku	Jharkhand Party
Pakaur	ST	Rani Jyotir Mayee Debi	Indian National Congress
Pakaur	ST	Jitu Kisku	Indian National Congress
Shikaripara	None	Supai Murmu	Jharkhand Party
Nalla	ST	Babulal Marandi	Jharkhand Party
Nalla	ST	Umeshwar Prasad	Jharkhand Party
Jamtara	None	Satrughna Besra	Jharkhand Party
Sarath	None	Badri Narayan Singh	Indian National Congress
Deoghar	SC	Shailbala Roy	Indian National Congress
Deoghar	SC	Mangulal Das	Indian National Congress
Dumka	ST	Binjamin Hansda	Jharkhand Party
Dumka	ST	Sanath Rout	Jharkhand Party
Ramgarh	ST	Sukhu Murmu	Indian National Congress
Godda	ST	Manilal Yadav	Jharkhand Party
Godda	ST	Chunka Hembrom	Independent
Mahagama	None	Mahendra Mahto	Praja Socialist Party
Pirpainti	None	Ramjanam Mahto	Indian National Congress
Colgong	SC	Bhola Nath Dass	Indian National Congress
Colgong	SC	Syed Maqbool Ahmad	Indian National Congress
Bhagalpur	None	Satyendra Narayan Agrawal	Indian National Congress
Gopalpur	None	Mani Ram Singh	Communist Party of India
Bihpur	None	Prabhunarain Roy	Communist Party of India
Sultanganj	None	Sarswati Devi	Indian National Congress
Amarpur	None	Shital Pd. Bhagat	Indian National Congress
Dhuraiya	None	Maulana Saminuddin	Indian National Congress
Banka	None	Bindhyabasini Devi	Indian National Congress
Katoria	ST	Raghvendra Narain Singh	Indian National Congress
Katoria	ST	Piroo Manjhi	Indian National Congress
Jhajha	ST	Chandra Shekhar Singh	Indian National Congress
Jhajha	ST	Bhagwat Murmu	Indian National Congress
Jamui	ST	Hari Prasad Sharma	Indian National Congress
Jamui	ST	Bhola Manjhi	Communist Party of India
Sheikhpura	ST	Shree Krishna Sinha	Indian National Congress
Sheikhpura	ST	Leela Devi	Indian National Congress
Burhee	None	Kapildeo Singh	Praja Socialist Party
Surajgarha	None	Karyanand Sharma	Communist Party of India
Tarapur	None	Basukinath Rai	Indian National Congress
Kharagpur	None	Narendra Prasad Singh	Indian National Congress
Monghyr	None	Nirpad Mukherji	Indian National Congress
Jamalpur	None	Jogendra Mahton	Indian National Congress
Parbatta	None	Lakshmi Devi	Indian National Congress
Chautham	None	Ghanshyam Singh	Indian National Congress
Bakhtiarpur	None	Mohammad Choudhary Salahuddin	Indian National Congress
Khagaria	SC	Misri Sada	Indian National Congress
Khagaria	SC	Kedar Narayan Singh Azad	Indian National Congress
Balia	None	Brahmdeo Narain Singh	Indian National Congress
Begusarai	SC	Saryoo Prasad Singh	Indian National Congress
Begusarai	SC	Medni Paswan	Indian National Congress
Bariarpur	None	Harihar Mahton	Indian National Congress
Teghra	None	Ramcharitar Sinha	Independent
Bachhwara	None	Baidyanath Prasad Singh	Praja Socialist Party
Athawan	None	Nand Kishore Pd. Singh	Chota Nagpur Santhal Parganas Janata Party
Mokamah	None	Jagdish Narain Singh	Indian National Congress
Barh	None	Ramyatan Singh	Indian National Congress
Fatwa	SC	Shiv Mahadeo Prasad	Praja Socialist Party
Fatwa	SC	Keshav Prasad	Chota Nagpur Santhal Parganas Janata Party
Bihar North	None	S. M. Aquil	Indian National Congress
Bihar South	None	Girbardhari Singh	Indian National Congress
Rajgrih	SC	Shyam Sundar Prasad	Chota Nagpur Santhal Parganas Janata Party
Rajgrih	SC	Baldeo Prasad	Indian National Congress
Chandi	None	Deogam Prasad Singh	Indian National Congress
Hilsa	None	Lal Singh Tyagi	Indian National Congress
Masaurhi	SC	Nawal Kishore Singh	Indian National Congress
Masaurhi	SC	Saraswati Chaudhary	Indian National Congress
Naubatpur	None	Ram Khelawan Singh	Indian National Congress
Patna South	None	Badri Nath Varma	Indian National Congress
Patna East	None	Zahra Ahmad	Indian National Congress
Patna West	None	Ramsaran Sao	Indian National Congress
Danapur	None	Jagat Narayan Lal	Indian National Congress
Maner	None	Shribhagwan Singh	Communist Party of India
Bikram	None	Manorma Devi	Indian National Congress
Paliganj	None	Chandradeo Prasad Verma	Praja Socialist Party
Sandesh	None	Jhaman Prasad	Indian National Congress
Arrah	None	Rang Bahadur Prasad	Indian National Congress
Arrah Muffasil	None	Ambika Sharan Singh	Indian National Congress
Shahpur	None	Ramanand Tiwary	Praja Socialist Party
Barhampur	None	Lallan Prasad Singh	Indian National Congress
Dumraon	None	Ganga Prasad Singh	Indian National Congress
Nawanagar	None	Raja Ram Arya	Indian National Congress
Buxar	None	Sheokumar Thakur	Indian National Congress
Ramgarh	None	Dasrath Tewari	Praja Socialist Party
Mohania	None	Badri Singh	Praja Socialist Party
Bhabua	SC	Aliwaris Khan	Indian National Congress
Bhabua	SC	Dular Chand Ram	Indian National Congress
Sasaram	SC	Ramadhar Dusadh	Praja Socialist Party
Sasaram	SC	Bipin Behari Sinha	Praja Socialist Party
Dehri	None	Basawon Singh	Praja Socialist Party
Nokha	None	Jagdish Prasad	Indian National Congress
Dinara	None	Ram Asish Singh	Praja Socialist Party
Bikramganj	None	Manorma Devi Pandey	Indian National Congress
Dawath	None	Krishnaraj Sinha	Indian National Congress
Piro	SC	Sumitra Devi	Indian National Congress
Piro	SC	Nagina Dusadh	Indian National Congress
Sahar	None	Sheo Pujan Rai	Indian National Congress
Arwal	None	Budhan Mehta	Indian National Congress
Kurtha	None	Kameshwar Sharma	Indian National Congress
Makhdumpur	None	Mithileshwar Prasad Singh	Indian National Congress
Jehanabad	SC	Mahabir Choudhary	Indian National Congress
Jehanabad	SC	Fida Hussain	Indian National Congress
Tekari	SC	Sukhdeo Prasad Verma	Indian National Congress
Tekari	SC	Rameshwar Manjhi	Indian National Congress
Daudnagar	None	Syed Ahmed Qadri	Indian National Congress
Nabinagar	SC	Anugrah Narayan Sinha	Indian National Congress
Nabinagar	SC	Deodhari Ram	Indian National Congress
Aurangabad	None	Priyabrat Narayan Sinha	Indian National Congress
Rafiganj	None	Sarjoo Prasad Sinha	Indian National Congress
Imamganj	None	Ambika Prasad Singh	Independent
Sherghati	None	Shahjehan Mohammad	Indian National Congress
Barachatti	None	Shreedhar Narain	Praja Socialist Party
Bodh Gaya	None	Shanti Debi	Indian National Congress
Koch	None	Ganauri Prasad Singh	Indian National Congress
Gaya	None	Sardar Mohammad Latifur Rahman	Indian National Congress
Gaya Muffasil	None	Hardeo Singh	Indian National Congress
Atri	None	Shivaratan Singh	Indian National Congress
Hisua	None	Raj Kumari Devi	Indian National Congress
Nawada	None	Manzoor Ahmad	Indian National Congress
Warsaliganj	SC	Ramkishun Singh	Indian National Congress
Warsaliganj	SC	Chetu Ram	Indian National Congress
Rajauli	None	Ramswaroop Prasad Yadav	Indian National Congress
Gawan	SC	Nageshwar Rai	Chota Nagpur Santhal Parganas Janata Party
Gawan	SC	Gopal Rabidas	Chota Nagpur Santhal Parganas Janata Party
Jamua	None	Indra Narain Singh	Chota Nagpur Santhal Parganas Janata Party
Giridih	ST	Kamakhya Narain Singh	Chota Nagpur Santhal Parganas Janata Party
Giridih	ST	Hemlal Pragnait	Chota Nagpur Santhal Parganas Janata Party
Bermo	None	Brajeshwar Prasad Singh	Chota Nagpur Santhal Parganas Janata Party
Bagodar	None	Vijay Raje	Chota Nagpur Santhal Parganas Janata Party
Barhi	None	Rameshwar Prasad Mahtha	Chota Nagpur Santhal Parganas Janata Party
Kodarma	None	G. P. Tripathy	Chota Nagpur Santhal Parganas Janata Party
Chauparan	None	Nand Kishore Singh	Chota Nagpur Santhal Parganas Janata Party
Chatra	None	Kamakhya Narain Singh	Chota Nagpur Santhal Parganas Janata Party
Barkagaon	None	Sashank Manjari	Chota Nagpur Santhal Parganas Janata Party
Hazaribagh	None	Basant Narain Singh	Chota Nagpur Santhal Parganas Janata Party
Mandu	None	Moti Ram	Chota Nagpur Santhal Parganas Janata Party
Ramgarh	ST	Rameshwar Manjhi	Chota Nagpur Santhal Parganas Janata Party
Ramgarh	ST	Tara Prasad Buxi	Chota Nagpur Santhal Parganas Janata Party
Topchanchi	SC	Manorama Sinha	Indian National Congress
Topchanchi	SC	Ram Lal Chamar	Indian National Congress
Dhanbad	None	Purushottam Chauhan	Indian National Congress
Nirsa	ST	Ram Narin Sharma	Indian National Congress
Nirsa	ST	Lakshmi Narain Manjhi	Indian National Congress
Chas	None	Hardayal Sharma	Indian National Congress
Tundi	None	Ram Chandra Prasad Sharma	Indian National Congress
Ghatsila	ST	Shyam Charan Murmu	Jharkhand Party
Ghatsila	ST	Shishir Kumar Mahto	Jharkhand Party
Potka	ST	Supai Soren	Jharkhand Party
Jamshedpur	None	Kedar Das	Communist Party of India
Jugsalai	None	V. G. Gopal	Indian National Congress
Seraikella	None	Aditya Pratap Singh Deo	Independent
Chaibasa	ST	Sukhdeo Manjhi	Jharkhand Party
Manjari	ST	Samad Sanatan	Jharkhand Party
Majhgaon	ST	Saran Balmuchu	Jharkhand Party
Manoharpur	None	Subhnath Deogam	Jharkhand Party
Chakradharpur	ST	Shyamal Kumar Pasari	Jharkhand Party
Chakradharpur	ST	Haricharan Soy	Jharkhand Party
Chandil	SC	Dhananjoy Mahto	Indian National Congress
Chandil	SC	Jatindra Nath Rajak	Independent
Tamar	ST	Dhan Singh Munda	Jharkhand Party
Silli	None	Bholanath Bhagat	Indian National Congress
Ranchi	SC	Jagannath Mahto	Jharkhand Party
Ranchi	SC	Ramratan Ram	Indian National Congress
Ranchi Sadr	None	Chintamanisaran Nath Shahdeo	Independent
Khunti	ST	Bir Singh Munda	Jharkhand Party
Torpa	ST	Julius Munda	Jharkhand Party
Kolebira	ST	Sushil Bage	Jharkhand Party
Simdega	ST	Marshal Kullu	Jharkhand Party
Chainpur	ST	Phablanus Oraon	Jharkhand Party
Gumla	ST	Sukru	Jharkhand Party
Sisai	ST	Kirpa Oraon	Jharkhand Party
Lohardaga	ST	Pritam Kujur	Jharkhand Party
Mandar	ST	Ram Vilas Prasad	Jharkhand Party
Mandar	ST	Ignes Kujur	Jharkhand Party
Latehar	ST	Johan Munjni	Chota Nagpur Santhal Parganas Janata Party
Latehar	ST	Lal Jagdhatri Nath Sah Deo	Chota Nagpur Santhal Parganas Janata Party
Daltonganj	None	Umeshwari Charan	Praja Socialist Party
Garhwa	None	Rajeshwari Saroj Dass	Indian National Congress
Bhawanathpur	SC	Jadunandan Tewari	Indian National Congress
Bhawanathpur	SC	Ramdeni Chamar	Indian National Congress
Leslieganj	SC	Rajkishore Singh	Indian National Congress
Leslieganj	SC	Ram Krishna Ram	Chota Nagpur Santhal Parganas Janata Party

== By-elections ==
In 1958 a by-election was held for the Dhanbad seat. The election was won by the Indian National Congress candidate R. Chaudhury, who obtained 8,998 votes. His opponent, M. Desai, received 5,792 votes.

In 1959 a by-election was held for the Nawada seat. The election was won by the Indian National Congress candidate M. Ahmad, who obtained 10,236 votes. His opponent, T. N. Yadav, received 7,474 votes.

== See also ==
- 1957 elections in India
- 1952 Bihar Legislative Assembly election
- 1962 Bihar Legislative Assembly election
