= S. M. Isha =

Former MLA of Ara

Member of the Bihar Legislative Assembly
- In office 1980–1989
- Preceded by: Sumitra Devi
- Succeeded by: Bashistha Narain Singh
- Constituency: Ara

Personal details
- Party: Indian National Congress

S. M. Isha was an Indian politician who had served as a Member of the Bihar Legislative Assembly from the Ara Assembly constituency for two consecutive terms in 1980 and 1985 being associated with the Indian National Congress.
