= Abdul Malik (politician) =

Indian politician

Member of the Bihar Legislative Assembly
- In office 1995–2000
- Preceded by: Bashistha Narain Singh
- Succeeded by: Amrendra Pratap Singh
- Constituency: Ara

Personal details
- Party: Janata Dal

Abdul Malik is an Indian politician who served as a Member of the Bihar Legislative Assembly from the Ara Assembly constituency in 1995 being associated with the Janata Dal. He was made minister of Information and Broadcasting department.
