= Abdul Malik =

Abdul Malik (Arabic: عبد الملك) is an Arabic (Muslim or Christian) male given name and, in modern usage, surname. It is built from the Arabic words Abd, al- and Malik. The name means "servant of the King", in the Christian instance 'King' meaning 'King of Kings' as in Jesus Christ and in Islam, Al-Malik being one of the names of God in the Qur'an, which give rise to the Muslim theophoric names.

The letter a of the al- is unstressed, and can be transliterated by almost any vowel, often by e. So the first part can appear as Abdel, Abdul or Abd-al. The second part may appear as Malik, Malek or in other ways. The whole name is subject to variable spacing and hyphenation.

There is a distinct but related name, Abdul Maalik (Arabic: عبد المالك), meaning "servant of the Owner", referring to the Qur'anic name Mālik-ul-Mulk. The two names are difficult to distinguish in transliteration, and some of the names below are instance of the latter one.

It may refer to:

== Given name ==
=== Political and military figures ===
- Abd al-Malik ibn Marwan (646–705), 5th Umayyad Caliph, ruling from Damascus
- Abd al-Malik ibn Umar ibn Marwan (718–778), Umayyad elder statesman, general, and governor of Seville.
- Abd al-Malik ibn Salih (died 812), Abbasid prince and general
- Abd al-Malik I (Samanid emir) (died 961), emir of the Sāmānids (Persia)
- Abd al-Malik II (Samanid emir) (fl. 999), emir of the Sāmānids (Persia)
- Abd al-Malik al-Muzaffar (died 1008), general and vizier of the Caliphate of Cordoba, and governor of Seville and Saragossa
- Abd al-Malik Abd al-Wahid (died 1339) son of Marinid Sultan of Morocco Abu al-Hasan Ali ibn Othman
- Abu Marwan Abd al-Malik I Saadi (died 1578), Sultan of Saadi Dynasty in Morocco
- Abu Marwan Abd al-Malik II (reigned 1627–1631), Sultan of Morocco
- Abdalmalik of Morocco (1696–1729), Sultan of Morocco
- Anwar Abdul Malik (1898–1998), Malaysian politician
- Abdul Malek Ukil (1924–1987), Bangladeshi lawyer and politician
- Abdelmalek Sellal (born 1948), Prime Minister of Algeria
- Abdul Malik (sergeant), Ghanaian soldier who co-led a coup attempt in 1983
- Abdulmalik Dehamshe (born 1943), Arab-Israeli politician
- Abdul Malik (politician), member of the Bihar Legislative Assembly 1995–2000
- Abdelmalek Droukdel (1970–2020), Algerian al-Qaeda leader
- Abdul Malik Pahlawan, Afghan militia leader who led his forces for both the Taliban and Northern Alliance
- Abdul-Malik al-Houthi (born 1979), Yemeni rebel
- Abdolmalek Rigi (ca. 1983–2010), Iranian Sunni militant
- Prince Abdul Malik of Brunei (born 1983), Prince of Brunei

=== Sportspeople ===
- Abdimalik hashem (athlete) (born 2011), somali sprinter
- Abdul Malik (athlete) (born 1939), Pakistani sprinter
- Abdul Malik Mydin (born 1975), Malaysian swimmer
- Abdelmalek Cherrad (born 1981), Algerian footballer
- Abdelmalek Djeghbala (born 1983), Algerian footballer
- Abdelmalek Ziaya (born 1984), Algerian footballer
- Abdelmalek Mokdad (born 1985), Algerian footballer
- Ahmed Eid Abdel Malek (born 1980), Egyptian footballer
- Abdul-Malik Abu (born 1995), American basketball player in the Israeli Premier Basketball League
- Abdul Malik (cricketer) (born 1998), Afghan cricketer
- Abdul Abdulmalik (born 2003), English footballer

=== Scholars ===
- Abd al-Malik ibn Quraib Al-Asmaʿi (ca. 740–828), Iraqi scholar
- Abu Manşūr 'Abd ul-Malik ibn Mahommed ibn Isma'īl, known as Tha'ālibī (961–1038), Persian-Arabic philologist and writer
- Abū Merwān ’Abdal-Malik ibn Zuhr (1091–1161), Muslim physician, pharmacist, surgeon, parasitologist and teacher in Al-Andalus
- Ali ibn Abd-al-Malik al-Hindi (1472–1567), Sunni Muslim scholar
- Haji Abdul Malik Karim Amrullah (1908–1981), Indonesian Muslim scholar

=== Pseudonym or stage name ===
- Abdul Malik, name used by Michael X (1933–1975), Trinidadian black revolutionary
- Abd al Malik (rapper), French rapper Régis Fayette-Mikano (born 1975)

=== Other ===
- Abd al-Malik ibn Rabi, early narrator of hadith
- Abd al-Malik Nuri (1921–1998), Iraqi novelist and fiction writer
- Ahmed Abdul-Malik (1927–1993), Sudanese-American jazz musician
- Abdul Malik (physician) (1929–2023), Bangladeshi professor and cardiologist, founder of Bangladesh National Heart Foundation
- Abdul Malik Jaber, Palestinian businessman
- Abdulmalik Mohammed (born 1973), Kenyan suspected of hotel bombing
- Abdul Malik Usman (died 2008), Malaysian killer sentenced to death in Singapore

== Surname ==
- Johari Abdul-Malik, American imam
- Nebila Abdulmelik (born 1987), Ethiopian activist
- Zainal Abidin Abdul Malik (1967–1996), Singaporean murderer
