= Sonadhari Singh Yadav =

Indian politician

Environment and forest minister Of Bihar
- In office 1985–1995
- Preceded by: Sidh Nath Rai
- Succeeded by: Rameshwar Prasad
- Constituency: Sandesh

Personal details
- Party: Janata Dal (United); Janata Dal; Lokdal; Indian National Congress
- Occupation: Politician social work

Sonadhari Singh Yadav is an Indian politician who was elected as a member of Bihar Legislative Assembly from Sandesh constituency. Yadav served as environment and forest minister under Lalu Prasad Yadav government.

== Political life ==
Yadav has started his politics in 1977 as a member of Congress Party but lost to Ram Dayal Singh from Sandesh Assembly constituency,1978 by polls elections he won this seat first time.

== See also ==
- Sandesh Assembly constituency
