= Rahul Tiwari =

Indian politician (born 1974)

Member of Bihar Legislative Assembly
- In office 2015–2025
- Constituency: Shahpur, Bihar Assembly constituency

Personal details
- Party: Rashtriya Janata Dal
- Relations: Ramanand Tiwary (Grandfather)
- Parent: Shivanand Tiwari (father)
- Profession: Politician

Rahul Tiwari (born 1974) is an Indian politician from Bihar. He has served as MLA from Shahpur Assembly constituency in Bhojpur District from 2015 to 2025. He had won the 2020 Bihar Legislative Assembly election representing Rashtriya Janata Dal.

== Early life and education ==
Tiwari is from Shahpur, Bhojpur District, Bihar. He is the son of Shivanand Tiwari and grandson of Ramanand Tiwary. He completed his intermediate in 1992 at College of Commerce, Patna.

== Career ==
Tiwari won from Shahpur Assembly constituency representing Rashtriya Janata Dal in the 2020 Bihar Legislative Assembly election. He polled 64,393 votes and defeated his nearest rival, Shobha Devi, an independent candidate, by a margin of 22,883 votes. He became an MLA for the first time winning the 2015 Bihar Legislative Assembly election from the same seat. In 2015, he polled 69,315 votes and defeated his nearest rival, Visheshwar Ojha of Bharatiya Janata Party, by a margin of 14,570 votes.

He lost to Bjp's Rakesh Ojha in 2020 Bihar Legislative Assembly elections
