= Sumitra Devi =

Sumitra Devi may refer to:

- Sumitra Devi (politician) (1922–2001), Indian politician
- Sumitra Devi (actress) (1923–1990), Indian actress
