= Sanjay Singh Tiger =

Indian politician based in Bihar

Minister of Higher Education Government of Bihar
- Incumbent
- Assumed office 7 May 2026
- Chief Minister: Samrat Choudhary
- Preceded by: Vijay Kumar Chaudhary

Minister of Law Government of Bihar
- Incumbent
- Assumed office 07 May 2026
- Chief Minister: Samrat Choudhary
- Preceded by: Samrat Choudhary

Minister of Labour Resources Government of Bihar
- In office 20 November 2025 – 15 April 2026
- Chief Minister: Nitish Kumar
- Preceded by: Nitish Mishra
- Succeeded by: Samrat Choudhary

Member (MLA) of Bihar Legislative Assembly
- Incumbent
- Assumed office 14 November 2025
- Preceded by: Amrendra Pratap Singh
- Constituency: Arrah
- In office 2010–2015
- Preceded by: Vijendra Yadav
- Succeeded by: Arun Yadav
- Constituency: Sandesh

Personal details
- Born: 1974 (age 51–52) Amrai village, Bhojpur district, Bihar, India
- Party: Bharatiya Janata party
- Spouse: unmarried
- Relations: Dharampal Singh (brother)
- Parent: Madhav Singh (father)
- Education: AN College, Patna
- Profession: Politician

Sanjay Singh Tiger (born 1974) is an Indian politician of the Bharatiya Janata Party (BJP) from Bhojpur district, Bihar. Presently he is serving as Minister of Higher Education and Law in the Bihar Government.

He has served as MLA in Bihar Legislative Assembly representing the Sandesh constituency from 2010 to 2015. Currently, he is the state spokesperson of BJP's Bihar unit.

== Early life ==
Sanjay Singh was born at Amrai village near Bihiya in Bhojpur district of Bihar. His father's name is Madhav Singh. Sanjay Singh has studied Bachelor of Arts from A.N. College, Patna in 1993.

== Family ==
His elder brother Dharampal Singh has served 2 times as MLA from Shahpur, Bihar (1990-2000). Sanjay Tiger is unmarried and he does not have children.

== Political career ==
Before 2010, he was a party worker when he was given ticket from the Sandesh constituency by the BJP. He became an MLA in 2010 by defeating Rameshwar Prasad (ex-MLA), Vijendra Kumar Yadav (sitting MLA) and his younger brother Arun Kumar Yadav, an Independent candidate by a margin of 6,822 votes.

Sanjay Singh Tiger lost the 2015 Bihar assembly election to Arun Kumar Yadav who was Rashtriya Janata Dal (RJD) candidate from Sandesh. On 19 October 2015, Amit Shah had campaigned for Tiger at a public rally in Jalpura Tapa village, Bhojpur district.

On 2 November 2025, Prime Minister Narendra Modi had come to campaign for him at Majhauwa airfield in Arrah.

== Positions held ==
Sanjay Singh Tiger has been elected as the MLA twice.

From	To	Position	Constituency	Party
2010	2015	MLA (1st term)	Sandesh	BJP
2025	Present	MLA (2nd term)	Arrah	BJP
20 November 2025	Present	Minister		
