= Arrah Assembly constituency =

Assembly constituency in Bihar, India

Coordinates: 25.55°N 84.67°E

- Constituency No. 194 for the Bihar Legislative Assembly
- Arrah Assembly constituency in Bhojpur

Constituency details
- Country: India
- Region: East India
- State: Bihar
- District: Bhojpur
- Lok Sabha constituency: Arrah
- Established: 1951
- Total electors: 327,553

Member of Legislative Assembly
- 18th Bihar Legislative Assembly
- Incumbent Sanjay Singh Tiger
- Party: BJP
- Alliance: NDA
- Elected year: 2025
- Preceded by: Amrendra Pratap Singh, BJP

Arrah Assembly constituency is one of 243 assembly seats of the Bihar Legislative Assembly. It is part of Arrah Lok Sabha constituency along with 6 other assembly constituencies named Sandesh, Barhara, Agiaon (SC), Tarari, Jagdishpur and Shahpur. Since 2015, Arrah has been one of the 36 seats to have VVPAT enabled electronic voting machines.

== Area/Wards ==
Arrah Assembly constituency comprises:

- Gram Panchayats: Ganghar, Ramapur Sandia, Piraunta, Sandia, Makhdumpur Dumra, Daulatpur, Bhakura, Jamira, Hasanpura, Gothahula, Karari, Mahuli & Arrah (MC) of Arrah CD Block.

== Members of the Legislative Assembly ==
From 1952 to 1967, Arrah had two assembly seats: Arrah and Arrah Muffasil. Later in 1967, Arrah Muffasil was merged into the Arrah constituency.

Ambika Sharan Singh of the Indian National Congress (INC) had won the Arrah Muffasil Assembly constituency in 1952, 1957 and 1962 Bihar Legislative Assembly elections.

The list of the Members of the Legislative Assembly (MLA) representing Arrah constituency is as follows:

Year	Member	Party
1952	Rang Bahadur Prasad	Indian National Congress
1957	Rang Bahadur Prasad	Indian National Congress
1962	Sumitra Devi	Indian National Congress
1967	Sumitra Devi	Indian National Congress
1969	Ram Awdhesh Singh	Samyukta Socialist Party
1972	Sumitra Devi	Indian National Congress
1977	Sumitra Devi	Janata Party
1980	S. M. Isha	Indian National Congress
1985	S. M. Isha	Indian National Congress
1990	Bashistha Narain Singh	Janata Dal
1995	Abdul Malik	Janata Dal
2000	Amrendra Pratap Singh	Bharatiya Janata Party
2005	Amrendra Pratap Singh	Bharatiya Janata Party
2005	Amrendra Pratap Singh	Bharatiya Janata Party
2010	Amrendra Pratap Singh	Bharatiya Janata Party
2015	Mohammad Nawaz Alam	Rashtriya Janata Dal
2020	Amrendra Pratap Singh	Bharatiya Janata Party
2025	Sanjay Singh Tiger	Bharatiya Janata Party

== Election results ==
=== 2025 ===
2025 Bihar Legislative Assembly election: Arrah
Party	Candidate	Votes	%	±%
BJP	Sanjay Singh Tiger	94,201	50.98	▲5.93
CPI(ML)L	Quyamuddin Ansari	74,620	40.38	▼2.79
JSP	Dr. Vijay Kumar Gupta	5,800	3.14	
NOTA	None of the above	4,154	2.25	▲0.49
Majority		19,581	10.6	▲8.72
Turnout		184,778	56.41	▲8.06
BJP hold		Swing		

=== 2020 ===
2020 Bihar Legislative Assembly election: Arrah
Party	Candidate	Votes	%	±%
BJP	Amrendra Pratap Singh	71,781	45.05	+0.54
CPI(ML)L	Quyamuddin Ansari	68,779	43.17	
Independent	Hakim Prasad	4,360	2.74	
Independent	Sheodas Singh	2,991	1.88	
NOTA	None of the above	2,811	1.76	−0.3
Majority		3,002	1.88	+1.45
Turnout		159,332	48.35	−2.91
BJP gain from RJD		Swing		

=== 2015 ===
2015 Bihar Legislative Assembly election: Arrah
Party	Candidate	Votes	%	±%
RJD	Mohammad Nawaz Alam	70,004	44.94	
BJP	Amrendra Pratap Singh	69,338	44.51	
CPI(ML)L	Kyamuddin Ansari	5,035	3.23	
Independent	Jitendra Kumar	1,710	1.1	
NOTA	None of the above	3,203	2.06	
Majority		666	0.43	
Turnout		155,787	51.26	
RJD gain from BJP		Swing		

=== 2010 ===
2010 Bihar Legislative Assembly election: Arrah
Party	Candidate	Votes	%	±%
BJP	Amrendra Pratap Singh	56,504	49.81	
LJP	Shree Kumar Singh	37,564	33.11	
CPI(ML)L	Meena Tiwari	5,314	4.68	
INC	Mohd. Jawed Iqbal	2,717	2.39	
Majority		18,940	16.70	
Turnout		1,13,450	49.40	
BJP hold		Swing		

== See also ==
- List of Assembly constituencies of Bihar
