= Shivanand Tiwari =

Indian politician

Rajya Sabha
- In office 2008–2014
- Constituency: Bihar

Cabinet Minister for Excise and Prohibition in Government of Bihar
- In office 2000–2005

Personal details
- Born: Bhojpur, Bihar, India
- Party: Rashtriya Janata Dal
- Spouse: Bimla Tiwary
- Children: 4 Rahul Tiwari
- Parent: Ramanand Tiwary (father)
- Relatives: Rahul Tiwari (son)

Shivanand Tiwari (born 1943) is a prominent politician from Bhojpur district, Bihar who was a member of the Janata Dal (United) political party, which he represented in the Rajya Sabha. First he was a prominent leader and spokesperson of Lalu Prasad Yadav's Rashtriya Janata Dal party. Later he was the General Secretary and spokesman for the JD (U). On 27 February 2014 he was denied renomination to Rajya Sabha, and expelled from the Nitish's Janata faction along with four other Lok Sabha members of the party. After his stint with Nitish's Janata Dal (U), he re-joined Lalu Prasad Yadav's RJD.

== Posts held ==
As of April 2014, Tiwari has held the following posts:

- 2000 - 2005 - Member, Bihar Legislative Assembly (first term) from Shahpur - Janata Dal
- Feb 2005 - Oct 2005 - Member, Bihar Legislative Assembly (second term) from Shahpur - RJD
- 2000–2005 Cabinet Minister for Excise and Prohibition, Government of Bihar
- 2005 - Won Feb 2005 Legislative Assembly election from Shahpur, lost the Oct 2005 elections from the same seat on RJD ticket
- May 2008 to April 2014 - Member, Rajya Sabha from JD(U)
- Joint Parliamentary Committee on Wakf
- August 2008 - Member, Committee on Finance and Member, Consultative Committee for the Ministry of Home Affairs

== See also ==
- List of politicians from Bihar
