= Radha Charan Sah =

Indian politician

Member of the Bihar Legislative Assembly
- Incumbent
- Assumed office 14 November 2025
- Preceded by: Kiran Devi Yadav
- Constituency: Sandesh

Member of the Bihar Legislative Council
- In office 17-Jul-2015 – November 2025
- Preceded by: Hulas Pandey
- Constituency: Bhojpur-Buxar LA

Personal details
- Born: 8 February 1954 (age 72) Bihar, India
- Party: Janata Dal (United)
- Other political affiliations: Rashtriya Janata Dal
- Profession: Politician

Radha Charan Sah is an Indian politician from Bihar. He is elected as a Member of Legislative Assembly in 2025 Bihar Legislative Assembly election from Sandesh constituency.

== Political career ==
Radha Charan Sah won from Sandesh constituency representing Janata Dal (United) in the 2025 Bihar Legislative Assembly election. He polled 80,598 votes and defeated his nearest rival, Dipu Singh of Rashtriya Janata Dal, by a low margin of 27 votes.

Earlier, he was elected as Member of the Bihar Legislative Council from Bhojpur in 2022.
