= Syed Ahmed Qadri =

Indian politician and MLA

Member of the Bihar Legislative Assembly
- In office 1957–1962
- Preceded by: Ramnaresh Singh
- Succeeded by: Ram Narayan Singh Yadav
- Constituency: Daudnagar

Personal details
- Born: Syed Ahmed; 1908 Munshi Muhallah, Aurangabad district, Bihar
- Died: 1983 (aged 74–75) Daudnagar, Bihar
- Party: Indian National Congress
- Parent: Syed Qaiyum Qadri (father)
- Education: Graduate (Patna University)
- Occupation: Politician, Agriculturist
- Founder of: Qadri School, Daudnagar

Syed Ahmed Qadri (1908–1983) was an Indian politician and a Member of the Bihar Legislative Assembly from Daudnagar Assembly constituency. he won in the 1957 Bihar Legislative Assembly elections and served till 1962. He was associated with the Indian National Congress. He was the founder and convenor of Qadri School, Daudnagar.

== Early life ==
Qadri was born to Syed Qaiyum Qadri, a local Zamindar at Munshi Muhallah, Aurangabad district in 1908.

He was admitted to Gaya Zila School and then graduated from Bihar National College of Patna University.
