= Jagdishpur, Bihar Assembly constituency =

Assembly constituency in Bihar, India

- Constituency No. 197 for the Bihar Legislative Assembly

Constituency details
- Country: India
- Region: East India
- State: Bihar
- District: Bhojpur
- Established: 1951
- Total electors: 308,381

Member of Legislative Assembly
- 18th Bihar Legislative Assembly
- Incumbent Shri Bhagwan Singh Kushwaha
- Party: JD(U)
- Alliance: NDA
- Elected year: 2025

Jagdishpur is one of 243 legislative assembly seats of legislative assembly of Bihar. It is part of Arrah Lok Sabha constituency along with other assembly constituencies viz Sandesh, Barhara, Arrah, Agiaon (SC), Tarari and Shahpur.

== Area/wards ==
Jagdishpur Assembly constituency comprises:

- Jagdishpur CD block
- Gram Panchayats: Ayar, Tar, Dhwarahi Jangal Mahal, Akrua, Kothua, Jamuaon, Jitaura Jangalmahal, Brawn, Tilath, Khannikala, Rajeyan, Amehta, Ktriyan, Lahthan, Agiaon and Nayka Tola Jangalmahal of Piro CD block.

== Members of the Legislative Assembly ==
The list of the Members of the Legislative Assembly (MLA) representing Jagdishpur constituency is as follows:

Year	Member	Party
1952	Sumitra Devi	Indian National Congress
1957-1962: Constituency did not exit
1962	Sukar Ram	Praja Socialist Party
1967	S. P. Rai	Indian National Congress
1969	Satya Narain Singh	Indian National Congress
1972	Shiv Pujan Varma	Indian National Congress
1977	Satya Narain Singh	Independent politician
1980	Bir Bahadur Singh	Independent politician
1985	Hari Narain Singh	Lokdal
1990	Shri Bhagwan Singh Kushwaha	Indian Peoples Front
1995	Hari Narain Singh	Janata Dal
2000	Shri Bhagwan Singh Kushwaha	Samata Party
2005 Feb	Shri Bhagwan Singh Kushwaha	Janata Dal (United)
2005 Oct	Shri Bhagwan Singh Kushwaha	Janata Dal (United)
2010	Dinesh Kumar Yadav	Rashtriya Janata Dal
2015	Ram Vishun Yadav	Rashtriya Janata Dal
2020	Ram Vishun Yadav	Rashtriya Janata Dal
2025	Shri Bhagwan Singh Kushwaha	Janata Dal (United)

== Election results ==
=== 2025 ===
2025 Bihar Legislative Assembly election: Jagdishpur
Party	Candidate	Votes	%	±%
JD(U)	Shri Bhagwan Singh Kushwaha	92,974	49.39	+31.91
RJD	Kishore Kunal	74,781	39.73	+0.05
JSP	Vijay Singh	5,106	2.71	
Independent	Rajeev Ranjan	3,272	1.74	
Independent	Hiralal Singh	3,070	1.63	
BSP	Sanjay Kumar Chaturvedi	2,820	1.5	−0.48
NOTA	None of the above	3,955	2.1	+1.61
Majority		18,193	9.66	−3.51
Turnout		188,244	61.04	+6.65
JD(U) gain from RJD		Swing		

=== 2020 ===
2020 Bihar Legislative Assembly election: Jagdishpur
Party	Candidate	Votes	%	±%
RJD	Ram Vishun Singh yadav	66,632	39.68	+5.86
LJP	Shri Bhagwan Singh Kushwaha	44,525	26.51	
JD(U)	Shushum Lata	29,362	17.48	
Independent	Anil Kumar Singh	7,249	4.32	
BSP	Dr. Shyam Nandan	3,317	1.98	+0.99
JAP(L)	Dinesh Kumar Singh	3,131	1.86	−2.56
Independent	Binod Kumar	2,529	1.51	
Independent	Haribansh Pandit	2,277	1.36	
JP	Sachchidanand Singh	1,960	1.17	
NOTA	None of the above	817	0.49	−1.07
Majority		22,107	13.17	+6.14
Turnout		167,935	54.39	+3.58
RJD hold		Swing		

=== 2015 ===
2015 Bihar Legislative Assembly election: Jagdishpur
Party	Candidate	Votes	%	±%
RJD	Ram Vishun Singh	49,020	33.82	
RLSP	Rakesh Raushan	38,825	26.79	
CPI(ML)L	Chandradip Singh	18,154	12.53	
Independent	Dinesh Kumar Singh	9,124	6.3	
JAP(L)	Kanhaiya Prasad Singh	6,410	4.42	
SP	Uday Shankar Singh	5,155	3.56	
Independent	Binod Kumar Singh	3,068	2.12	
Rashtravyapi Janta Party	Anjani Kumar Singh	1,496	1.03	
BSP	Pamod Yadav	1,440	0.99	
Independent	Gautam Kumar Mehta	1,394	0.96	
NOTA	None of the above	2,263	1.56	
Majority		10,195	7.03	
Turnout		144,930	50.81	
RJD hold		Swing		

=== 2010 ===
2010 Bihar Legislative Assembly election: Jagdishpur
Party	Candidate	Votes	%	±%
RJD	Dinesh Yadav	55,560	42.65	
JD(U)	Shri Bhagwan Singh Kushwaha	45,374	34.83	
CPI(ML)L	Sudama Prasad	16,129	12.38	
Independent	Hussain Imam	3,784	2.9	
Majority		10,186	7.82	
Turnout		1,30,261	54.38	
Registered electors		2,39,532		
