= Raghvendra Pratap Singh (Bihar politician) =

Indian politician

Member of Bihar Legislative Assembly
- Incumbent
- Assumed office November 2020
- Chief Minister: Nitish Kumar
- Preceded by: Saroj Yadav
- Constituency: Barhara
- In office 2010–2015
- Preceded by: Asha Devi
- Succeeded by: Saroj Yadav
- In office 1985–2005
- Preceded by: Ramjee Prasad Singh
- Succeeded by: Asha Devi

Personal details
- Born: 1 January 1952 (age 74)
- Party: Bharatiya Janata Party
- Parent: Ambika Sharan Singh (father)
- Occupation: MLA
- Profession: Agriculture

Raghvendra Pratap Singh is an Indian politician, currently a member of Bharatiya Janata Party and six time Member Of Legislative Assembly from Barhara. He is the son of Ambika Sharan Singh, who was a noted freedom fighter, former Bihar state minister and five time MLA from Barhara. Raghvendra Pratap Singh has also been Bihar state minister twice earlier.

He claimed to have ensured huge participation from Barhara in the recently organized Veer Kunwar Singh Vijayotsav in Jagdishpur.
