= Kiran Devi Yadav =

Indian politician based in Bihar

Member (MLA) of Bihar Legislative Assembly
- In office 2020–2025
- Preceded by: Arun Yadav
- Succeeded by: Radha Charan Sah
- Constituency: Sandesh

Personal details
- Born: 11 January 1974 (age 52) Bhojpur district, Bihar, India
- Party: Rashtriya Janata Dal
- Spouse: Arun Yadav
- Relations: Vijendra Yadav (brother-in-law)
- Profession: Politician

Kiran Devi Yadav (born 11 January 1974) is an Indian politician and a member of Bihar Legislative Assembly. She is representing the Sandesh constituency in Bhojpur district of Bihar and was elected in 2020 as a member of Rashtriya Janata Dal (RJD).

== Family ==
Kiran Devi Yadav is married to Arun Kumar Yadav who is also a former MLA of Sandesh constituency from 2015 to 2020.

She defeated Arun Yadav's elder brother Vijendra Kumar Yadav in the 2020 Bihar Legislative Assembly election from Sandesh.
