= Vijendra Kumar Yadav =

Indian politician based in Bihar

Member (MLA) of Bihar Legislative Assembly
- In office Oct 2005 – 2010
- Preceded by: Rameshwar Prasad
- Succeeded by: Sanjay Singh Tiger
- In office 2000 – Feb 2005
- Preceded by: Rameshwar Prasad
- Succeeded by: Rameshwar Prasad
- Constituency: Sandesh

Personal details
- Born: 1962 (age 63–64) Lasardhi, Bhojpur district, Bihar
- Party: Janata Dal (United)
- Other political affiliations: Rashtriya Janata Dal
- Relations: Arun Yadav (brother); Kiran Yadav (sister-in-law)
- Parent: Bhuvneshwar Prasad Singh (father)
- Education: BA from Magadh University in 1982
- Profession: Politician

Vijendra Kumar Yadav (born 1962) is an Indian politician and a member of Bihar Legislative Assembly of India. He represented the Sandesh constituency in Bhojpur district of Bihar. He was elected in 2000 as a member of Rashtriya Janata Dal (RJD) but later left the party to join JD(U).

== Career ==
Vijendra Yadav become first time MLA in 2000 from Sandesh constituency by defeating Rameshwar Prasad (sitting MLA) and Sondhari Singh Yadav of Samata Party (ex-MLA).

Vijendra Yadav lost the February 2005 Bihar Legislative Assembly election to Rameshwar Prasad, but again re-elected to same constituency in October 2005 and remained till 2010.

In 2010 Bihar Legislative Assembly election, Vijendra Yadav and his younger brother Arun Yadav both contested against each other from Sandesh constituency. But both of them lost to Sanjay Singh Tiger of the Bharatiya Janata Party (BJP).

== Family ==
His younger brother Arun Yadav was MLA of Sandesh from 2015 to 2020. In 2020 Bihar Legislative Assembly election, Vijendra Yadav lost to his sister-in-law Kiran Devi Yadav of RJD. Kiran Yadav is wife of Arun Yadav.
