= Barhara Assembly constituency =

Assembly constituency in Bihar, India

Coordinates: 25.68°N 84.73°E

- Constituency No. 193 for the Bihar Legislative Assembly

Constituency details
- Country: India
- Region: East India
- State: Bihar
- District: Bhojpur
- Established: 1951
- Total electors: 312,103

Member of Legislative Assembly
- 18th Bihar Legislative Assembly
- Incumbent Raghvendra Pratap Singh
- Party: BJP
- Alliance: NDA
- Elected year: 2025

Barhara Assembly constituency is one of 243 legislative assembly seats of the legislative assembly of Bihar. It is part of Arrah lok sabha constituency along with other assembly constituencies viz Sandesh, Arrah, Agiaon (SC), Tarari, Jagdishpur and Shahpur.

== Area/ Wards ==
The Barhara Assembly constituency comprises:

- CD Block Barhara
- Gram Panchayats: Ijri, Sundarpur Barja, Agarsanda, Baghipakar, Basantpur, Dhamar & Khajuria of Arrah CD Block
- Gram Panchayats: Khesrahiya, Mathurapur, Rajapur, Daulatpur, Chanda, Gidha, Birampur & Kayam Nagar of the Koilwar CD Block.

== Members of the Legislative Assembly ==
The Barhara Assembly constituency was created in 1951. The list of the Members of the Legislative Assembly (MLA) representing Barhara constituency is as follows:

Year	Member	Party
1952	Ram Vilash Singh	Akhil Bharatiya Ram Rajya Parishad
1957-1967: Constituency did not exit
1967	Ambika Sharan Singh	Indian National Congress
1969	Mahanth Mahadeva Nand Giri	Independent politician
1972	Ram Vilash Singh	Indian National Congress
1977	Ambika Sharan Singh	Janata Party
1980	Ramjee Prasad Singh	Indian National Congress
1985	Raghwendra Pratap Singh	Janata Party
1990	Raghwendra Pratap Singh	Janata Dal
1995	Raghwendra Pratap Singh	Janata Dal
2000	Raghwendra Pratap Singh	Rashtriya Janata Dal
2005 Feb	Asha Devi	Janata Dal (United)
2005 Oct	Asha Devi	Janata Dal (United)
2010	Raghwendra Pratap Singh	Rashtriya Janata Dal
2015	Saroj Yadav	Rashtriya Janata Dal
2020	Raghwendra Pratap Singh	Bharatiya Janata Party

== Election results ==
=== 2025 ===
2025 Bihar Legislative Assembly election: Barhara
Party	Candidate	Votes	%	±%
BJP	Raghwendra Pratap Singh	79,593	43.71	−2.44
RJD	Ashok Kumar Singh	65,190	35.8	−7.33
Independent	Surya Bhan Singh	9,268	5.09	
Independent	Saroj Yadav	8,984	4.93	
Independent	Ranvijay Kumar Singh	3,863	2.12	
JSP	Saurabh Singh Yadav	3,189	1.75	
Independent	Sourav Narang	2,361	1.3	
Independent	Banshidhar Singh	1,799	0.99	
NOTA	None of the above	3,471	1.91	+0.22
Majority		14,403	7.91	+4.89
Turnout		182,096	58.34	+5.74
BJP hold		Swing		

=== 2020 ===
2020 Bihar Legislative Assembly election: Barhara
Party	Candidate	Votes	%	±%
BJP	Raghwendra Pratap Singh	76,182	46.15	+10.89
RJD	Saroj Yadav	71,209	43.13	−1.21
Independent	Asha Devi	7,203	4.36	
Independent	Manjee Kumar Shah	2,635	1.6	
NOTA	None of the above	2,784	1.69	−0.3
Majority		4,973	3.02	−6.06
Turnout		165,087	52.6	+1.32
BJP gain from RJD		Swing		

=== 2015 ===
2015 Bihar Legislative Assembly election: Barhara
Party	Candidate	Votes	%	±%
RJD	Saroj Yadav	65,001	44.34	
BJP	Asha Devi	51,693	35.26	
SP	Raghwendra Pratap Singh	13,638	9.3	
CPI(ML)L	Lalan Yadav	3,442	2.35	
Independent	Sanjay Kumar Singh	1,820	1.24	
BSP	Ajay Ray	1,582	1.08	
Hindustan Vikas Dal	Dr. Anil Kumar Singh	1,507	1.03	
Independent	Siyamati Rai	1,350	0.92	
NOTA	None of the above	2,916	1.99	
Majority		13,308	9.08	
Turnout		146,612	51.28	
RJD hold		Swing		

=== 2010 ===
2010 Bihar Legislative Assembly election: Barhara
Party	Candidate	Votes	%	±%
RJD	Raghwendra Pratap Singh	46,102	41.52	
JD(U)	Asha Devi	45,019	40.54	
INC	Bhai Brahmeshwer	6,084	5.48	
CPI(ML)L	Rajiv Ranjan	3,672	3.31	
Majority		1,083	0.98	
Turnout		1,11,049	47.66	
Registered electors		2,32,971		
