= Jamira =

- Census town & village
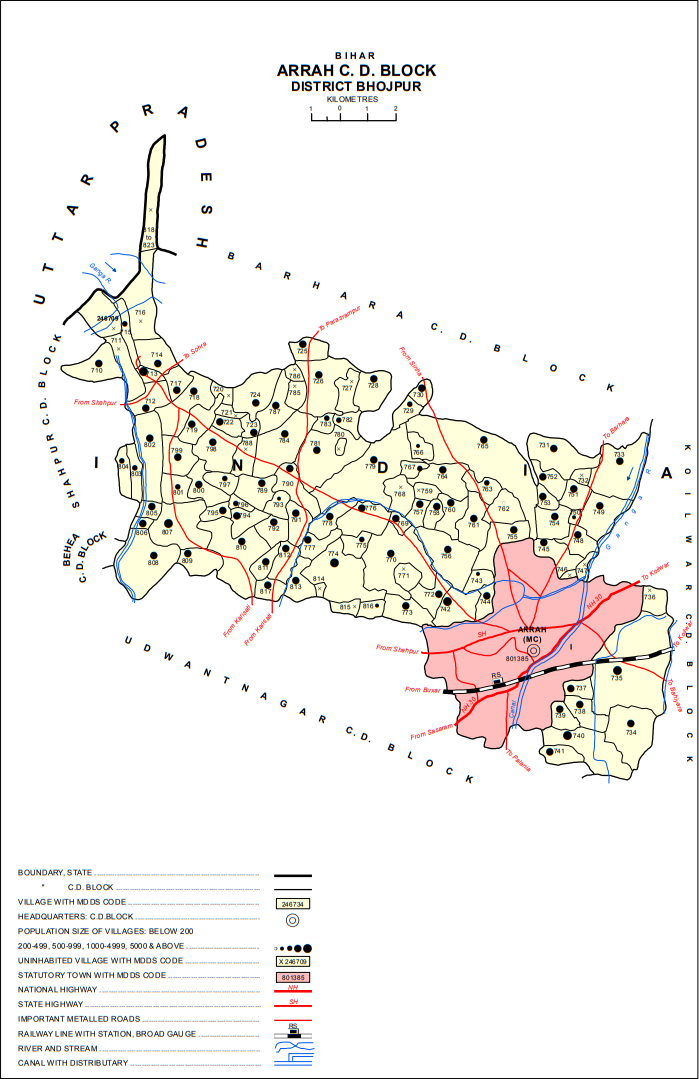
- Map of Jamira (#735) in Arrah block

- Location in Bihar, India Jamira (India)
- Coordinates: 25.33°N 84.42°E
- Country: India
- State: Bihar
- District: Bhojpur
- Elevation: 63 m (207 ft)

Population (2011)
  - Total: 13,891

Languages
  - Official: Bhojpuri
- Time zone: UTC+5:30 (IST)
- PIN: 802 161
- Telephone code: +91-6182
- ISO 3166 code: IN-BR
- Vehicle registration: BR03 XXXX

Jamira is a village in Bhojpur district in the Indian state of Bihar. As per constitution of India and Panchyati Raaj Act, Jamira village is administrated by Sarpanch (Head of Village) who is elected representative of village.

== Administration ==
Jamira is administered under the Panchayati Raj system. The local governance is managed by an elected Sarpanch and Ward Members. The village belongs to the Arrah Sadar administrative block.

== Demography ==
Jamira is a large village located in Arrah of Bhojpur district, Bihar with total 2058 families residing. The Jamira village has population of 13891 of which 7345 are males while 6546 are females as per Population Census 2011.

In Jamira village population of children with age 0-6 is 2676 which makes up 19.26% of total population of village. Average Sex Ratio of Jamira village is 891 which is lower than Bihar state average of 918. Child Sex Ratio for the Jamira as per census is 858, lower than Bihar average of 935.

Jamira village has lower literacy rate compared to Bihar. In 2011, literacy rate of Jamira village was 55.09% compared to 61.80% of Bihar. In Jamira Male literacy stands at 66.16% while female literacy rate was 42.77%.

Details	Male	Female	Total	Comments
Number of houses	-	-	2,058	(census 2011)
Adult	7,345	6,546	13,891	(census 2011)
Children (0-6)	1,440	1,236	2,676	(census 2011)
Literacy	66.16%	42.77%	55.09%	(census 2011)

== Education ==
Primary and upper-primary education in the village is anchored by government-run institutions, supplemented by private schools in neighboring wards and secondary schools in nearby Arrah.

- Government Middle School Jamira (M.S. Jamira): Established in 1917, M.S. Jamira is one of the oldest educational institutions in the Arrah Sadar block. Managed by the Department of Education, Bihar, it is a co-educational primary and upper-primary school serving Grades 1 through 8 with Hindi as the medium of instruction.
  - Infrastructure & Details: The school operates from a government building containing 8 instructional classrooms, a functional hand-pump drinking water system, functional boys' and girls' restrooms, and a library with over 200 books. The institution participates in the national Mid-Day Meal scheme prepared on-site.
  - UDISE Code: `10290112102`

Nearby primary and feeder schools in the local educational cluster include N.P.S. Lakshanpur East Tola, Upgraded High School Lakshanpur, P.S. Bhushaula, and U.M.S. Alipur. For higher secondary and university education, students commute to institutions in Arrah, including colleges affiliated with Veer Kunwar Singh University (VKSU).

== Culture and Local Religious Landmarks ==
Jamira and its immediate surrounding hamlets (tolas) feature several local shrines and temples that host annual fairs, puja celebrations, and kirtans:

- Satdevi Mandir & Mahadev Mandir: Key religious gathering points for local festival celebrations such as Chhath, Shivratri, and Durga Puja.
- Gram Panchayat Governance: Being one of the larger Gram Panchayats in the Ara Sadar block, Jamira plays a central administrative role for nearby smaller villages and agricultural wards.

== Economy and Local Life ==
- Agrarian Base: The vast majority of the population depends on farming—primarily growing paddy (rice), wheat, pulses, and mustard.
- Commuter Economy: Due to its proximity to Arrah town and the availability of local rail transit via Jamira Halt, many residents commute for work in civil construction, local trade, government administration, and transport services in Arrah city.

== Transportation ==
Jamira is connected by air (Lok Nayak Jayaprakash Airport), by train (Ara railway station) and by road.

=== Complete departure list from Jamira Halt Station ===
Train No.	Train name	Type	Zone	PF	From	Sch	To	Sch
63214	Ara - Patna MEMU	MEMU	ECR	2	JMIR	07:11	PNBE	08:45
13209	Patna - Pt. Deen Dayal Upadhyaya Jn. MEMU Express	Express	ECR	1	JMIR	08:37	DDU	14:40
63219	Danapur - Buxar MEMU	MEMU	ECR	1	JMIR	10:57	BXR	14:50
63264	Pt. Deen Dayal Upadhyaya Jn. - Patna MEMU	MEMU	ECR	2	JMIR	11:10	PNBE	15:10
63220	Buxar - Patna MEMU	MEMU	ECR	2	JMIR	17:09	PNBE	20:15
63213	Patna - Ara MEMU	MEMU	ECR	1	JMIR	18:17	ARA	19:20
13210	Pt. Deen Dayal Upadhyaya Jn. - Patna MEMU Express	Express	ECR	1	JMIR	19:22	PNBE	22:00
53261	Fatuha - Buxar Passenger	Passenger	ECR	1	JMIR	19:42	BXR	23:55
63226	Varanasi - Patna MEMU	MEMU	ECR	2	JMIR	20:56	PNBE	00:15

== Climate ==
Climate is characterized by relatively high temperatures and evenly distributed precipitation throughout the year. The Köppen Climate Classification sub-type for this climate is "Cfa" (Humid Subtropical Climate).

Climate data for Jamira
Month	Jan	Feb	Mar	Apr	May	Jun	Jul	Aug	Sep	Oct	Nov	Dec	Year
Mean daily maximum °C (°F)	22 (72)	25 (77)	32 (90)	37 (99)	37 (99)	35 (95)	32 (90)	31 (88)	32 (90)	31 (88)	27 (81)	23 (73)	31 (88)
Mean daily minimum °C (°F)	10 (50)	12 (54)	17 (63)	23 (73)	25 (77)	26 (79)	26 (79)	26 (79)	26 (79)	22 (72)	16 (61)	11 (52)	20 (68)
Average precipitation mm (inches)	9.9 (0.39)	9.9 (0.39)	9.9 (0.39)	0.0 (0.0)	30 (1.18)	180 (7.08)	290 (11.41)	330 (12.99)	210 (8.26)	50 (1.96)	0.0 (0.0)	0.0 (0.0)	1,180 (46.45)
Average precipitation days	1	1	1	0	3	10	14	15	8	4	0	0	60
Source: Weatherbase

== See also ==
- Bhojpur district, Bihar
- Arrah
- List of villages in Arrah block
