= Mohammad Nawaz Alam =

Indian politician based in Bihar

Member (MLA) of Bihar Legislative Assembly
- In office 2015–2020
- Preceded by: Amrendra Pratap Singh
- Succeeded by: Amrendra Pratap Singh
- Constituency: Arrah

Personal details
- Born: 1967 (age 58–59)
- Party: Rashtriya Janata Dal
- Education: HD Jain College, Arrah; Veer Kunwar Singh University

Mohammad Nawaz Alam (born 1967) is an Indian politician belonging to Rashtriya Janata Dal (RJD). He was elected as a member of Bihar Legislative Assembly from Arrah in 2015.
