= Sandesh Assembly constituency =

Assembly constituency in Bihar, India

Sandesh
- Constituency No. 192 for the Bihar Legislative Assembly

Constituency details
- Country: India
- Region: East India
- State: Bihar
- District: Bhojpur
- Lok Sabha constituency: Arrah
- Established: 1957
- Total electors: 291,878
- Reservation: None

Member of Legislative Assembly
- 18th Bihar Legislative Assembly
- Incumbent Radha Charan Sah
- Party: JD(U)
- Alliance: NDA
- Elected year: 2025

Sandesh is one of 243 assembly seats of the Bihar Legislative Assembly. It is part of Arrah Lok Sabha constituency along with other assembly constituencies viz Barhara, Arrah, Agiaon, Tarari, Jagdishpur and Shahpur.

== Area/Wards ==
Sandesh Assembly constituency comprises:

- Sandesh CD block
- Udwantnagar CD block
- Gram Panchayats: Sakaddi, Kulharia, Dhandiha, Bhadwar, Narbirpur, Khangaon, Gopalpur, Jalpura Tapa, Jokta and Koilwar (Nagar panchayat) of Koilwar CD block

== Members of the Legislative Assembly ==
| Year | Member | Party |
|---|---|---|
Until 1956: Constituency did not exit
| 1957 | Jhaman Prasad | Indian National Congress |
| 1962 | Jhaman Prasad | Indian National Congress |
| 1967 | R. S. Singh | Praja Socialist Party |
| 1969 | Ramji Prasad Singh | Bharatiya Jana Sangh |
| 1972 | Ramji Prasad Singh | Bharatiya Jana Sangh |
| 1977 | Ram Dayal Singh | Janata Party |
| 1978^ | Sonadhari Singh Yadav | Indian National Congress |
| 1980 | Sidh Nath Rai | Indian National Congress |
| 1985 | Sonadhari Singh Yadav | Lok Dal |
| 1990 | Sonadhari Singh Yadav | Janata Dal |
| 1995 | Rameshwar Prasad | Communist Party of India (Marxist–Leninist) Liberation |
| 2000 | Vijendra Yadav | Rashtriya Janata Dal |
| 2005 Feb | Rameshwar Prasad | Communist Party of India (Marxist–Leninist) Liberation |
| 2005 Oct | Vijendra Yadav | Rashtriya Janata Dal |
| 2010 | Sanjay Singh Tiger | Bharatiya Janata Party |
| 2015 | Arun Kumar Yadav | Rashtriya Janata Dal |
| 2020 | Kiran Devi Yadav | Rashtriya Janata Dal |
| 2025 | Radha Charan Sah | Janata Dal (United) |

== Election results ==
=== 2025 ===
2025 Bihar Legislative Assembly election: Sandesh
| Party | Candidate | Votes | % | ±% |
|---|---|---|---|---|
| JD(U) | Radha Charan Sah | 80,598 | 43.99 | +25.22 |
| RJD | Dipu singh | 80,571 | 43.97 | −7.57 |
| JSP | Rajeev Ranjan | 6,040 | 3.3 | |
| Independent | Mukesh Singh | 5,399 | 2.95 | |
| Independent | Samarjay Singh | 2,474 | 1.35 | |
| NOTA | None of the above | 4,160 | 2.27 | +0.04 |
| Majority | | 27 | 0.02 | −32.75 |
| Turnout | | 183,230 | 62.78 | +9.82 |
| JD(U) gain from RJD | | Swing | | |

=== 2020 ===
2020 Bihar Legislative Assembly election: Sandesh
| Party | Candidate | Votes | % | ±% |
|---|---|---|---|---|
| RJD | Kiran Yadav | 79,599 | 51.54 | +1.75 |
| JD(U) | Vijendra Yadav | 28,992 | 18.77 | |
| LJP | Shweta Singh | 28,500 | 18.45 | |
| RLSP | Shiv Shankar Prasad | 3,351 | 2.17 | |
| JAP(L) | Baban Kumar | 2,603 | 1.69 | +0.79 |
| Bhartiya Kranti Vir Party | Krishna Paswan | 1,720 | 1.11 | |
| Rashtriya Jan Jan Party | Santosh Kumar Singh | 1,660 | 1.07 | |
| Rashtrawadi Janlok Party (Satya) | Manmohan Singh | 1,516 | 0.98 | |
| NOTA | None of the above | 3,449 | 2.23 | −0.26 |
| Majority | | 50,607 | 32.77 | +15.73 |
| Turnout | | 154,455 | 52.96 | −3.2 |
| RJD hold | | Swing | | |

=== 2015 ===
2015 Bihar Legislative Assembly election: Sandesh
| Party | Candidate | Votes | % | ±% |
|---|---|---|---|---|
| RJD | Arun Yadav | 74,306 | 49.79 | |
| BJP | Sanjay Tiger | 48,879 | 32.75 | |
| CPI(ML)L | Raju Yadav | 15,879 | 10.64 | |
| JAP(L) | Baban Kumar | 1,350 | 0.9 | |
| NOTA | None of the above | 3,713 | 2.49 | |
| Majority | | 25,427 | 17.04 | |
| Turnout | | 149,245 | 56.16 | |
| RJD gain from BJP | | Swing | | |

=== 2010 ===
2010 Bihar Legislative Assembly election: Sandesh
| Party | Candidate | Votes | % | ±% |
|---|---|---|---|---|
| BJP | Sanjay Tiger | 29,988 | 26.57 | |
| Independent | Arun Yadav | 23,166 | 20.53 | |
| RJD | Vijendra Yadav | 16,779 | 14.87 | |
| CPI(ML)L | Rameshwar Prasad | 15,095 | 13.37 | |
| Majority | | 6,822 | 6.04 | |
| Turnout | | 1,12,866 | 52.78 | |
| Registered electors | | 2,13,826 | | |

== See also ==
- List of Assembly constituencies of Bihar
