= Ganauri Prasad Singh =

Indian politician

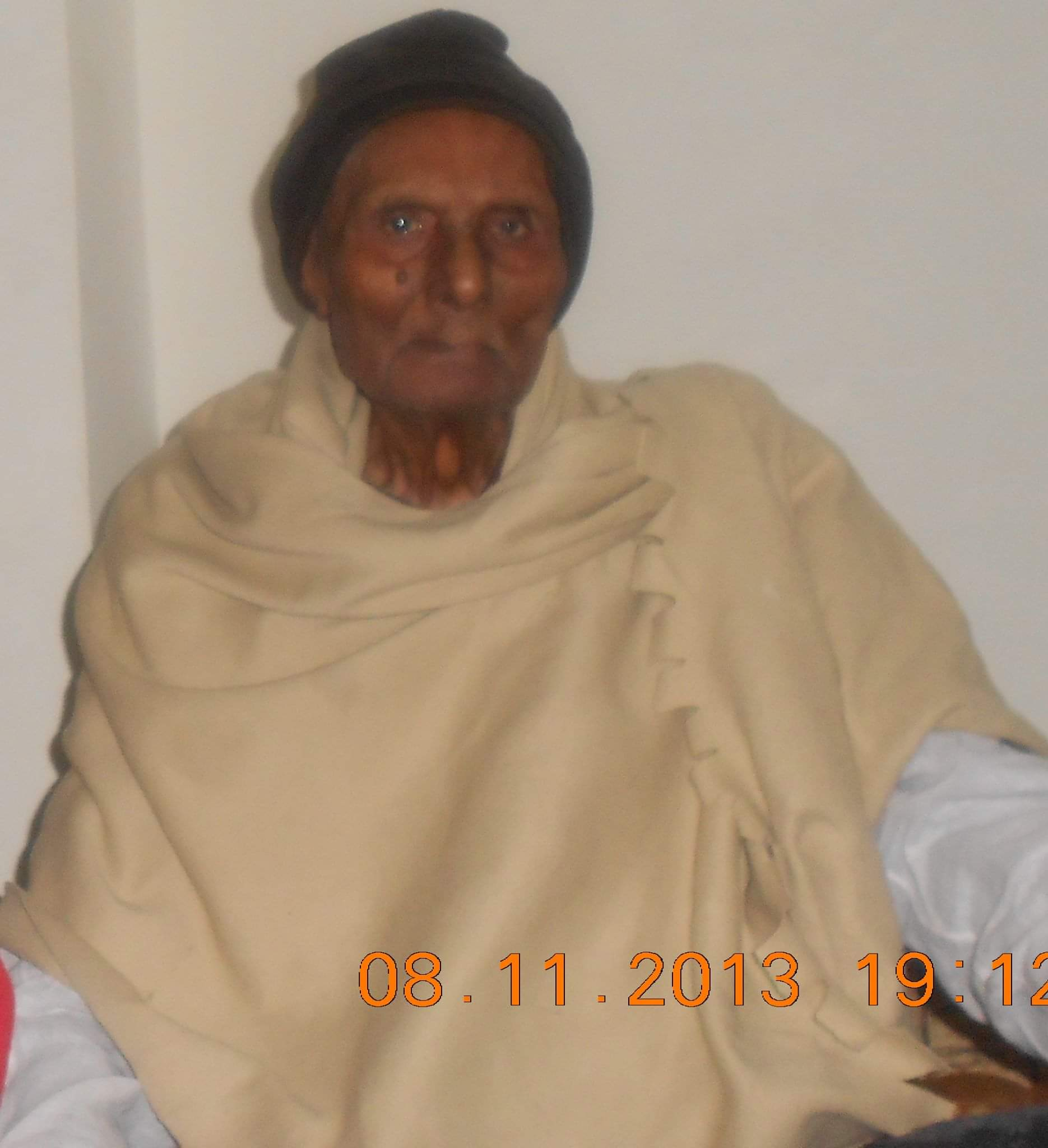
Ganauri Prasad Singh in 2013

Ganauri Prasad Singh is a politician from Gaya Bihar, India. He was born in Gaya, Bihar. He was elected to the Bihar Legislative Assembly in 1957 from Koach legislative assembly. He established the Ashok madhyamik Vidyalaya at Paraiya. He also worked in several organisations and committees like the Bihar transport board, the Bihar cooperative society, The ZRUCC, and many more.

Ganauri Prasad Singh was born in the year 1922 in village Mai of Khizarsarai Block in Gaya District.
