= Ram Vishun Singh =

Indian politician from Bihar

Member of Bihar Legislative Assembly
- In office 2015–2025
- Preceded by: Dinesh Kumar Singh
- Succeeded by: Shri Bhagwan Singh Kushwaha
- Constituency: Jagdishpur

Personal details
- Born: 3 July 1954 (age 72) Village Dhakakaram, P.O. Barnav, Dist Bhojpur Arrah, India
- Party: Rashtriya Janata Dal
- Education: BSC (math)
- Profession: Politician

Ram Vishun Singh also known as Ram Vishun Yadav and popularly called as Lohiya Ji is an Indian politician. He was elected to the Bihar Legislative Assembly from Jagdishpur (Vidhan Sabha constituency) as the 2015 Member of Bihar Legislative Assembly as a member of the Rashtriya Janata Dal.
