= Arun Kumar Yadav (Bhojpur politician) =

Indian politician based in Bihar

Member (MLA) of Bihar Legislative Assembly
- In office 2015–2020
- Preceded by: Sanjay Singh Tiger
- Succeeded by: Kiran Devi Yadav
- Constituency: Sandesh

Personal details
- Born: 1965 (age 60–61) Bhojpur, Bihar, India
- Party: Rashtriya Janata Dal
- Spouse: Kiran Devi Yadav
- Relations: Vijendra Yadav (brother)
- Parent: Bhuvneshwar Prasad Singh (father)
- Profession: Politician

Arun Kumar Yadav (born 1965) is an Indian politician and a member of Bihar Legislative Assembly. He represented the Sandesh constituency in Bhojpur district of Bihar. Arun Yadav was elected in 2015 as a member of Rashtriya Janata Dal (RJD).

== Career ==
In 2010 Bihar Legislative Assembly election, Arun Yadav and his elder brother Vijendra Yadav both contested against each other from Sandesh constituency. But both of them lost to Sanjay Singh Tiger of the Bharatiya Janata Party (BJP).

In 2015 Bihar Legislative Assembly election, Arun Yadav won the Sandesh seat by defeating Sanjay Singh Tiger.

== Family ==
Arun Yadav is married to Kiran Devi Yadav. His elder brother Vijendra Kumar Yadav has served 2 times as MLA of Sandesh constituency from 2000 to Feb 2005 and Oct 2005 to 2010.

In 2020 Bihar Legislative Assembly election, Arun Yadav's wife Kiran Yadav (RJD) defeated Vijendra Yadav (JD(U)) from Sandesh.

== 2015 Criminal charges ==
In his election affidavit of 2015, Arun Kumar Yadav has mentioned that he has 13 criminal cases upon him including murder, attempt to murder, kidnapping and extortion cases.

== 2019 Rape case ==
Arun Kumar Yadav is accused of raping a minor girl at Arrah on 18 July 2019. When Yadav did not appear in the court after repeated summons, a warrant and order for seizure of his property were issued and he was declared an absconder by court on February 27, 2020.

Arun Yadav surrendered in the Special POCSO court of Arrah on 16 July 2022.
