= Rakesh Ojha =

Indian politician

Member of the Bihar Legislative Assembly
- Incumbent
- Assumed office 14 November 2025
- Constituency: Shahpur

Personal details
- Born: Bihar, India
- Party: Bharatiya Janata Party
- Parent: Visheshwar Ojha (father)
- Profession: Politician

Rakesh Visheshwar Ojha is an Indian politician from Bihar. He is elected as a Member of Legislative Assembly in 2025 Bihar Legislative Assembly election from Shahpur constituency.

== Political career ==
Rakesh Ojha won from Shahpur constituency representing Bharatiya Janata Party in the 2025 Bihar Legislative Assembly election. He polled 88,655 votes and defeated his nearest rival, Rahul Tiwari of Rashtriya Janata Dal, by a margin of 15,225 votes.
