= Sidh Nath Rai =

Indian politician

Member of the Bihar Legislative Assembly
- In office 1980–1985
- Preceded by: Sonadhari Singh Yadav
- Succeeded by: Sonadhari Singh Yadav
- Constituency: Sandesh

Personal details
- Party: Indian National Congress
- Occupation: Politician social work

Sidh Nath Rai was an Indian politician who was elected as a member of Bihar Legislative Assembly from Sandesh constituency.

== See also ==
- Sandesh Assembly constituency
