= Dinesh Kumar Singh =

Indian politician

Member of Bihar Legislative Assembly
- In office 2010–2015
- Preceded by: Sribhagwan Singh
- Succeeded by: Ram Vishnun Singh
- Constituency: Jagdishpur

Personal details
- Born: Village & Post Office- Barnaw, PS- Ayer, Anchal Jagdishpur, Dist- Bhojpur Arrah, India
- Party: Rashtriya Janata Dal
- Profession: Politician

Dinesh Kumar Singh, popularly called Dinesh Yadav, was an Indian politician. He was elected to the Bihar Legislative Assembly from Jagdishpur (Vidhan Sabha constituency) as the 2010 Member of Bihar Legislative Assembly as a member of the Rashtriya Janata Dal.
