= Piprahiya, Bhojpur =

Piprahiya Piprāhiya
- Village
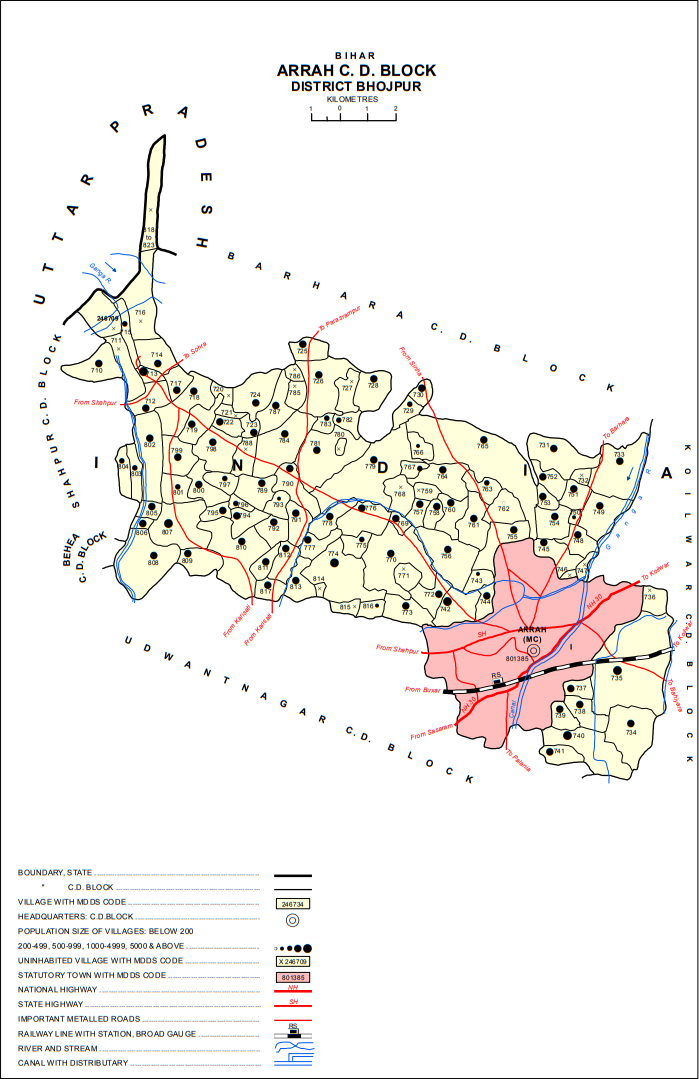
- Map of Piprahiya (#737) in Arrah block

- Location in Bihar, India Piprahiya (India)
- Coordinates: 25.54751°N 84.68591°E
- Country: India
- State: Bihar
- District: Bhojpur

Area
  - Total: 0.070 km^{2} (0.027 sq mi)
- Elevation: 63 m (207 ft)

Population (2011)
  - Total: 2,465
  - Density: 35,000/km^{2} (91,000/sq mi)

Languages
  - Official: Bhojpuri, Hindi
- Time zone: UTC+5:30 (IST)

Piprahiya is a village in the southeastern part of Arrah block in Bhojpur district, Bihar, India. As of 2011, its population was 2,465, in 371 households.
