= Rameshwar Prasad (politician, born 1947) =

Indian politician

Member (MLA) of Bihar Legislative Assembly
- In office Feb 2005 – Oct 2005
- Preceded by: Vijendra Yadav
- Succeeded by: Vijendra Yadav
- In office 1995–2000
- Preceded by: Sonadhari Singh
- Succeeded by: Vijendra Yadav
- Constituency: Sandesh

Member of Parliament (MP) in Lok Sabha
- In office 1989–1991
- Preceded by: Bali Ram Bhagat
- Succeeded by: Ram Lakhan Singh Yadav
- Constituency: Arrah

Personal details
- Born: July 1947 Bharatpura Village, Patna, Bihar
- Party: Indian People's Front
- Spouse: Lalpari Devi
- Parent: Radhe Nonia (father)

Rameshwar Prasad (Hindi: रामेश्वर प्रसाद) is an Indian politician, belonging to the Communist Party of India (Marxist-Leninist) Liberation. He is a Central Committee member of CPI (ML) Liberation and the president of All India Agricultural Labourers Association (AIALA).

== Background ==
Rameshwar Prasad hails from a Nonia family and is the son of a brick-kiln worker. Prasad dropped out of school in 1979, to become a full-time activist of the party. He studied at Bansidhari High School, Bharatpura, Bihar.

== Member of Parliament ==
He was elected to the Lok Sabha, the lower house of the Indian national parliament, in 1989 as the Indian People's Front candidate from the Arrah constituency by securing 178,211 votes. He became the first Naxalite Member of Parliament from Bihar. His election slogan was har mazdur ko roziroti, har dalit ko man; har kisan ko khet-pani, har yuvak ko kam ('Daily bread for every worker, dignity for every Dalit, water and land for every farmer, employment for every youth'). He was the only candidate of Indian Peoples' Front to get elected in those elections.

Prasad lost his parliamentary seat in the 1991 Lok Sabha election, again standing as an Indian People's Front candidate. His vote had dropped to 117,262 (17.17%, finishing in third place). Prasad came third in the Arrah seat in the 1996 Lok Sabha election, with 146,398 votes (22.97%). He contested the Arrah Lok Sabha seat again in the 1999 election, again finishing third with 141,939 votes (20.82%).

In 2006, CPI(ML)Liberation nominated Prasad to contest a by-poll for the Nalanda Lok Sabha seat. Prasad obtained 17,515 votes (5.62%).

== Assembly Member (MLA) ==
=== 1995 election ===
He won the Sandesh seat with 36,760 votes (34.23%), as a CPI(ML)Liberation candidate, in the 1995 Bihar Legislative Assembly election.

=== 2000 election ===
Rameshwar Prasad lost the 2000 Bihar Legislative Assembly election from Sandesh constituency to Vijendra Kumar Yadav, finishing at 3rd position with 28,776 votes (25.21%).

=== 2005 election ===
He again won the seat in the February 2005 legislative assembly election, with 33,834 votes (32.73%). However, he lost the seat in the October 2005 election to Vijendra Kumar Yadav, finishing in third position with 26,323 votes.

=== 2010 election ===
Rameshwar Prasad was the CPI(ML)Liberation candidate from Sandesh in the 2010 Bihar assembly election. But on 19 October 2010, he was arrested by police while he was filing his nomination papers in relation to the attack carried out on Arrah Collectorate and Court. Rameshwar Prasad lost to Sanjay Singh Tiger and finished in fourth place in the election, with 15,095 votes.

== Criminal Charges ==
There are seven cases of Cognizable offence under Indian Penal Code, Arms Act 1959 and Explosive Substances Act 1883 against Prasad in various Districts of Bihar In 2000, there was a violent confrontation had occurred at Arrah Collectorate and Court in connection with a protest against a police killing of a CPI(ML)Liberation activist. Prasad and others have been accused of leading with others, a mob of 1500 to 2000 persons who entered into the premises of Collectorate and Civil Court of Arrah who pelted stones and also exploded bombs. Four CPI(ML)Liberation activists were killed in the police firing. CPI(ML)Liberation asserts that the local police had lodged criminal cases against the CPI(ML)Liberation leaders (including Prasad) as a retaliatory measure. His party strongly condemned the arrest of Prasad, labeling it 'illegal'. He has been charged under Sections 147, 148, 149, 323, 324, 307, 337, 353, 332, 333 and 182 of the Indian Penal Code, Sections 3 and 4 of the Explosive Substances Act 1883 and Section 27 of the Arms Act 1959.

Rameshwar Prasad was granted bail by the Patna High Court on 10 November 2010. Prasad had pleaded that he was only a member of the mob. Court granted him bail on furnishing bail bond of ₹ 10,000 with two sureties of the like amount.
