= Bhagwan Singh Kushwaha =

Indian politician

Shri Bhagwan Singh Kushwaha
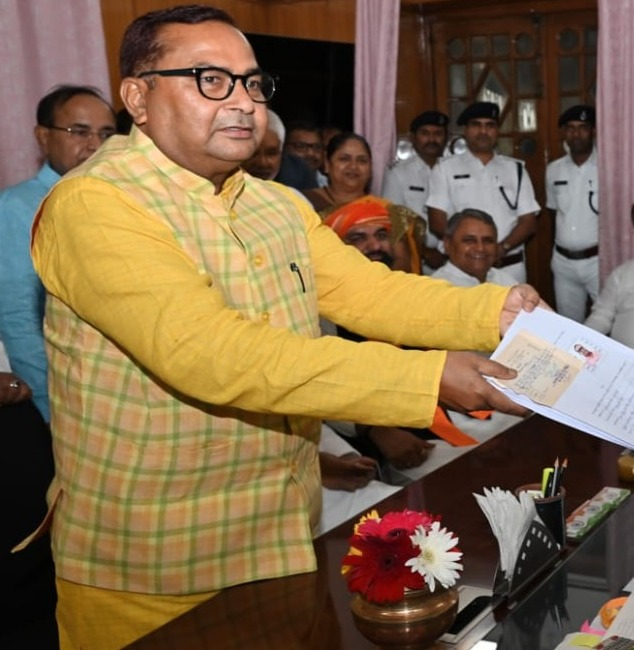

Minister of Planning and Development Government of Bihar
- Incumbent
- Assumed office 07 May 2026
- Chief Minister: Samrat Choudhary
- Preceded by: Bijendra Prasad Yadav

Member of Bihar Legislative Council
- Incumbent
- Assumed office 6 May 2024

Personal details
- Born: Jagdishpur; Bihar; India
- Party: JD(U)
- Other party: CPI(M-L); RJD; LJP; Jan Adhikar Party; RLSP
- Relatives: Jagdish Mahto (Father-in-law)
- Occupation: Leader; Politician; Former Minister for Rural Development in Bihar
- Known for: Being Minister in the government of Bihar. Bihar state Vice President of Janata Dal (United); National General Secretary of Janata Dal (United).

Shri Bhagwan Singh Kushwaha is a politician from Bihar, who has also served as a minister in the Government of Bihar. He is a son-in-law of Jagdish Mahto— the founder of Naxalism in Ekwari village of the Bhojpur region of Bihar. He has assumed several important posts in various regional political parties of Bihar, which include Communist Party of India (Marxist–Leninist), Rashtriya Janata Dal, Janata Dal (United), Lok Janshakti Party, Jan Adhikar Party Loktantrik and Rashtriya Lok Samata Party. Kushwaha once headed JD(U)'s youth wing and has also been Minister for rural development in Bihar. In July 2024, he was elected to the Bihar Legislative Council. He was nominated by the Janata Dal (United) as its candidate to fill the vacancy of the post caused by end of the tenure of another leader of the party. He is currently serving as the Minister of Planning and Development in Samrat Chaudhary cabinet.

== Life and political career ==
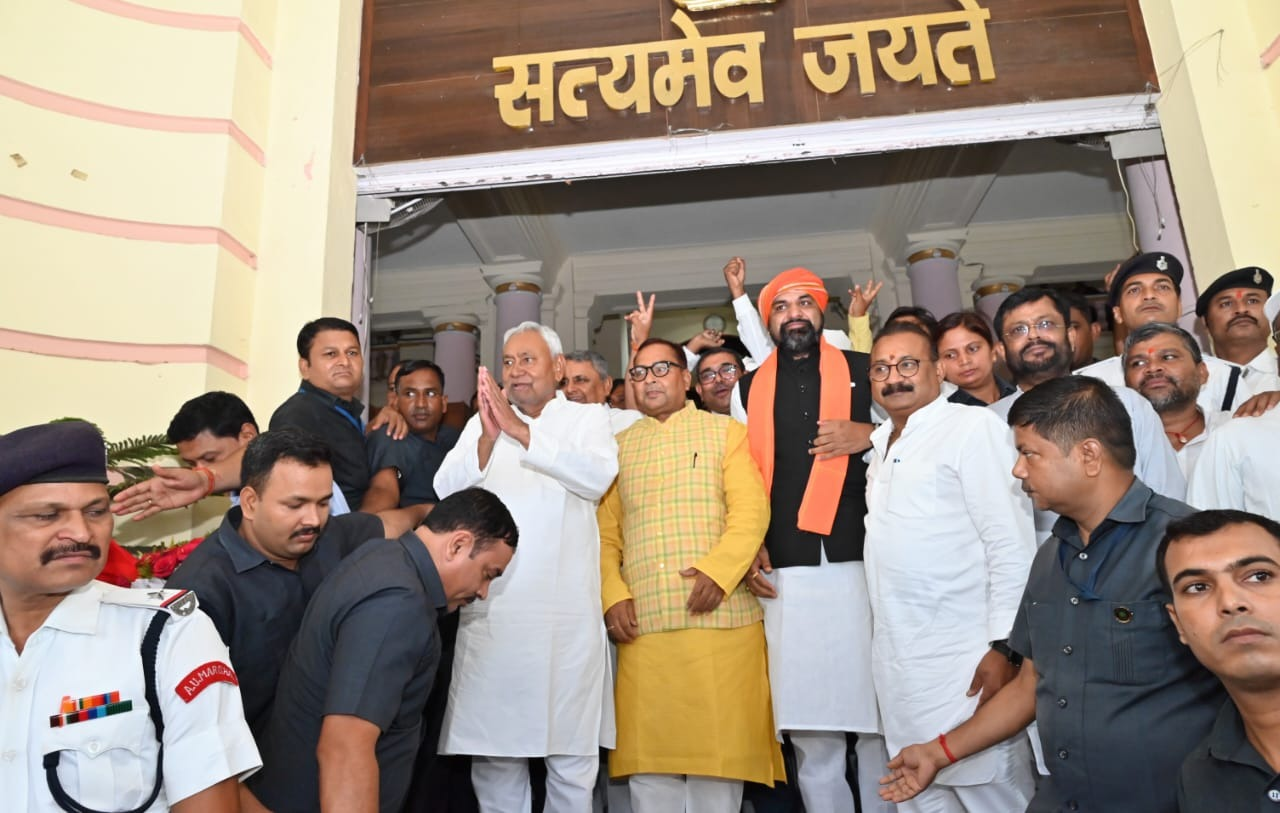
Shri Bhagwan Singh Kushwaha with Nitish Kumar and Samrat Chaudhary on 2 July 2024, before being elected to Bihar Legislative Council.

Bhagwan Singh Kushwaha is a son of Devdhari Singh, who hails from Jagdishpur in Arrah district of Bihar. In the early part of his life, he was associated with the social work, before entering the politics. His spouse is a government servant. He is educated till matriculation level. Kushwaha is charged with several criminal cases, as per his affidavit submitted to Election Commission of India. In the affidavit, he reveals the charges lodged against him which includes murder, attempt to murder, rioting and possession of harmful weapons. Kushwaha contests the election to Bihar Legislative Assembly from the Jagdishpur Assembly constituency. He started his political career from the Indian People's Front, which came to be known as CPI-ML later. In 1990, he was elected from the Jagdishpur constituency to the Bihar Legislative Assembly as the CPI-ML candidate, but in the next election the seat was won by Harinarayan Singh of Janata Dal; Kushwaha was reelected in 2000 from this seat, this time on the ticket of Samata Party (now led by Uday Mandal its President). After the formation of Janata Dal (United) from the Samata Party, Kushwaha was elected once again in 2005 as the member of new party, the Janata Dal (United), from the Jagdishpur seat.

The dormant political career of Kushwaha got a boost once again after formation of Rashtriya Lok Samata Party by Upendra Singh Kushwaha in 2013, as a result of split in the ruling JD(U). To bring all Kushwaha leaders under one umbrella for better political outcomes, some of the veteran politicians were given high posts in the newly formed party. This included Bhagwan Singh Kushwaha, who was made party's vice president. In 2018, Upendra Kushwaha, the founder of Rashtriya Lok Samata Party, left the Bharatiya Janata Party led National Democratic Alliance, which was seen by many of his party members as a suicidal step. Bhagwan Singh Kushwaha too protested against this decision and left RLSP to join the JD(U) with 35 state level office bearers and at least 1200 workers of the party. His exit was preceded by the exit of other legislators of the party which included Sudhanshu Shekhar and Lalan Paswan. In the presence of JD(U)'s contemporary state president, Bashistha Narain Singh, Kushwaha hailed his decision to part his ways with RLSP.

"When I joined the RLSP, my condition was that it should remain with the NDA. What Kushwaha has done (by severing ties with NDA) was not liked by party's rank and file. I tried my level best to ensure that Upendra Kushwaha should remain with NDA but he (Upendra) started feeling uneasy after Nitish Kumar joined the NDA."

In October 2020, before the Bihar Assembly elections, he was found to be involved in anti-party activities after he was denied ticket by the JDU in the assembly elections. As a result of this, he along with some of the former leaders of the party were ousted for a period of 6 years. Among those who were expelled was the former Member of Legislative Assembly, Dadan Pahalwan.

=== 2020 assembly elections ===
In 2020 elections to Bihar Legislative Assembly, after being denied ticket from JD(U), he contested from the Lok Janshakti Party in the Jagdishpur constituency. In a tripartite battle between JDU, Rashtriya Janata Dal and Lok Janshakti Party, he lost to Ram Vishun Singh of RJD. Among the three key candidates, he was able to secure second position between the winner and Sushmlata Kushwaha, the third runner up.

=== Return to JDU ===
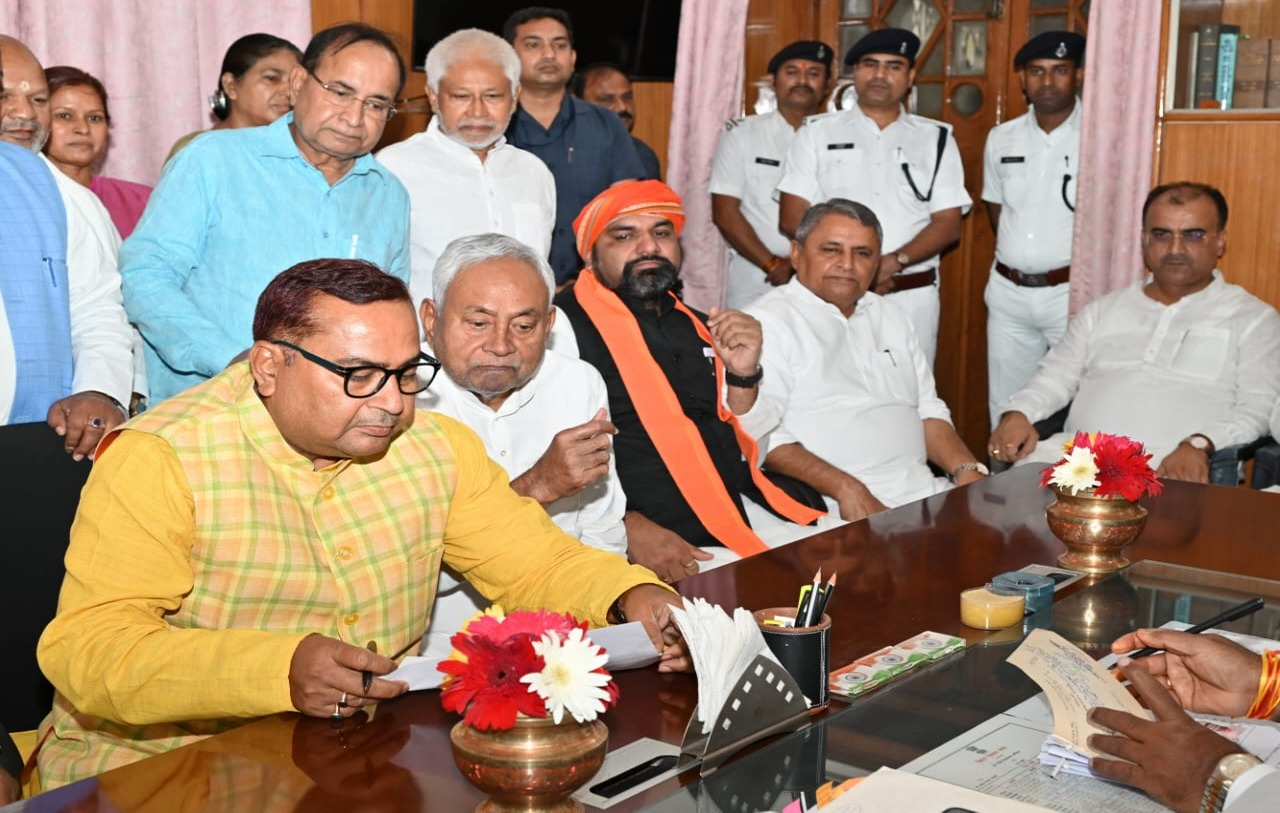
Shri Bhagwan Singh Kushwaha accompanied by Nitish Kumar and Samrat Chaudhary, filing his nomination papers for Bihar Legislative Council election, on 2 July 2024.

After unsuccessfully contesting Jagdishpur seat on LJP ticket in 2020 assembly election, he once again returned to JDU in August, 2021.

In July 2024, he was made a candidate of the JDU for Bihar Legislative Council. This decision came after the vacancy was created on one seat of Bihar Legislative Council, which was earlier held by Rambali Chandravanshi.

== Criminal accusations ==
In 1993, while Kushwaha was associated with Indian People's Front, an infamous incident took place in the Ichri village of the Bhojpur district. This incident was a part of caste based violence in post independence Bihar. In this particular incident, some supporters of Indian People Front attacked a group of Rajput caste men, who were returning to their village from a rally organised by Bhartiya Janata Party. In the ambush, five people were killed on the spot, while above half a dozen men were severely injured. The families of the victims alleged Kushwaha to be one of the convict behind this massacre. In 2023, thirty years after the incident, a court at Arrah acquitted Kushwaha due to lack of evidence against him. However, nine other people were granted life imprisonment in this case.

In 2013, Kushwaha was also accused of being a conspirator in the assassination of chief (Mukhiya) of Ichri village, Binod Singh. The deceased was regional head of Akhil Bhartiya Rashtriya Kisan Mahasangh (ABRKM), a body of upper caste landlords. A First Information Report registered by the victim's father named Nathuni Yadav, the former Mukhiya as another conspirator apart from Kushwaha.
