= Ambika Sharan Singh =

Indian government minister (1922-1977)

Ambika Sharan Singh (22 December 1922 – 6 July 1977) also known as Surajiya Babuji was a noted freedom fighter and minister of state in the Finance Ministry (Independent Charge) of the Government of Bihar. He has served 3 times as MLA of Arrah Muffasil (1952-1967) after delimitation of Arrah Muffasil to Barhara . He then became 2 times MLA of Barhara (1967-1969), in 1969 court had debarred him for 6 years. In the year 1971 ( 06/03/1971 ) he became Chairman of Bihar State Finance Corporation till 1974 ( 04.10.1974 ). In 1977 he again won the election prior to his death in the same year.

== Early life and background ==
He was born in a Rajput family in village Dhamar of Bhojpur district in Bihar. Rajputs have always been influential & powerful in Bhojpur District. His father Pradeep Rai Singh & mother died in his childhood, his uncle Ramsunder Rai Singh looked after the family. He was a bright student did his schooling from Ara Jain School with First Division and completed his Graduation and joined Master in Arts from Patna College, Patna University which he dropped to join the freedom movement, during his student life inspired by Gandhi Philosophy he joined the freedom struggle in association with Shree Gaya prasad singh(Leader of Sandesh Block Freedom Fighter Association) and Kailash Singh from his nearby village.

== Struggle in Indian independence ==
He took active part in freedom struggle therefore has to drop his studies in between. In 1940 has gone underground, was once arrested by police but was able escape from the police custody. All Bihar Congress Leader has trust in him and ask him to lead Youth Congress Wing in the year 1942 he toured the entire Bihar to encourage the youth to join the India's Freedom Struggle. After the independence he was made the first Youth Congress Wing President in the year 1947.

== Politics ==
He joined politics after the Struggle of India Independence, he contested Arrah Muffasil successfully in 1952 and then in 1957 and 1962. In 1967 the assembly seat was reconstituted and Barhara became his constituency from where he was elected in year 1967 from Indian National Congress. However he was debarred by court to not contest election for 6 years. His close friend Ram Vilas Singh won the Barhara constituency election in the year 1972. He was part of Sangathan Congress which became a part of Janata Party hence he contested from Janata Party in the year 1977 and won the Barhara Seat.

He was made the Deputy Finance Minister in 1957 under Deputy Chief Minister & Finance Minister Dr. Anugrah Narayan Sinha in Sri Krishna Singh Ministry at the age 35 and was regarded young and dynamic deputy Finance Minister of Bihar. He also handled the Law Ministry when Binodanand Jha was Chief Minister of Bihar. As K. B. Sahay became Chief Minister of Bihar in the year 1963 was made Minister of State (Independent Charge) Finance Department until the year 1967. He was the Chairman of Bihar State Financial Corporation from 6 March 1971 to 4 October 1974.

== Personal life ==
He was married to Kamala Devi, they had three sons and a daughter.

== Death ==
He died due to heart attack in Hotel The Claridges, New Delhi on 6 July 1977. Some prominent people to visit the hotel after his death were then Prime Minister Morarji Desai, Mr. Chandra Shekhar, Mr. Satyendra Narain Singh, Jagjivan Ram, and Mr. Karpoori Thakur. His last rites were performed in Bas Gath Patna by his elder son Raghvendra Pratap Singh (MLA Barhara).
