= Shahpur, Bihar Assembly constituency =

Assembly constituency in Bihar, India

- Constituency No. 198 for the Bihar Legislative Assembly

Constituency details
- Country: India
- Region: East India
- State: Bihar
- District: Bhojpur
- Established: 1951
- Total electors: 308,161

Member of Legislative Assembly
- 18th Bihar Legislative Assembly
- Incumbent Rakesh Ranjan
- Party: BJP
- Alliance: NDA
- Elected year: 2025

Shahpur Assembly constituency is one of 243 legislative assembly seats of legislative assembly of Bihar. It is part of Arrah lok sabha constituency along with other assembly constituencies viz Sandesh, Barhara, Arrah, Agiaon (SC), Tarari and Jagdishpur.

In Madhya Pradesh Vidhan Sabha, there was a constituency by the same name, but the Shahpur Assembly constituency in Madhya Pradesh became defunct in 2008. Its serial number in the Election commission records is 198.

Former Bihar minister and veteran socialist leaderRamanand Tiwari served as MLA from here for five consecutive terms from 1952 to 1969. This seat has been considered a stronghold of socialists. The Tiwari family has always held the Shahpur seat. Ramanand Tiwari's son, Shivanand Tiwari, won on an RJD ticket in 2000 and 2005, followed by his grandson Rahul Tiwari in 2015 and 2020.

BJP has been betting on a single family in the Shahpur Assembly constituency for the past twenty years. In 2005, the BJP first fielded Munni Devi, wife of Mukteshwar Ojha alias Bhuar Ojha, a resident of Ojhavaliya village in Shahpur, and the niece of Visheshwar Ojha. In the election, she defeated a stalwart like Shivanand Tiwari. 2010, Munni Devi defeated RJD's Dharampal Singh for a second time. However, in 2015, the party denied sitting MLA Munni Devi's ticket. In her place, her brother-in-law, Visheshwar Ojha, was appointed state vice president and declared the party's candidate from Shahpur. However, in this election, Shivanand Tiwari's son and RJD candidate, Rahul Tiwari, defeated her.

Subsequently, in the 2020 elections, the BJP again fielded Munni Devi. However, this time, her sister-in-law, Shobha Devi, wife of the late Visheshwar Ojha, also contested as an independent candidate. Her son, Rakesh Visheshwar Ojha, led the election campaign. However, due to the infighting between the sister-in-law and sister-in-law, RJD candidate Rahul Tiwari won for the second time.

== Area/Wards ==
Shahpur Assembly constituency comprises:

- Shahpur CD block
- Behea CD block

== Members of the Legislative Assembly ==
The list of the Members of the Legislative Assembly (MLA) representing Shahpur constituency is as follows:

Year	Member	Party
1952	Ramanand Tiwari	Socialist Party
1957	Ramanand Tiwari	Praja Socialist Party
1962	Ramanand Tiwari	Praja Socialist Party
1967	Ramanand Tiwari	Samyukta Socialist Party
1969	Ramanand Tiwari	Samyukta Socialist Party
1972	Suraj Nath Choubey	Indian National Congress
1977	Jai Narain Mishra	Janata Party
1980	Anand Sharma	Indian National Congress
1985	Bindeshwari Dubey	Indian National Congress
1990	Dharam Pal Singh	Janata Party
1995	Dharam Pal Singh	Janata Dal
2000	Shivanand Tiwari	Rashtriya Janata Dal
2005	Shivanand Tiwari	Rashtriya Janata Dal
2005	Munni Devi	Bharatiya Janata Party
2010	Munni Devi	Bharatiya Janata Party
2015	Rahul Tiwari	Rashtriya Janata Dal
2020	Rahul Tiwari	Rashtriya Janata Dal
2025	Rakesh Ojha	Bharatiya Janata Party

== Election results ==
=== 2025 ===
2025 Bihar Legislative Assembly election: Shahpur
Party	Candidate	Votes	%	±%
BJP	Rakesh Visheshwar ojha	88,655	49.69	+36.05
RJD	Rahul Tiwari	73,430	41.16	+0.02
JSP	Padma Ojha	3,948	2.21	
BSP	Dharmendra Kumar	2,923	1.64	
Independent	Manan Shah	2,536	1.42	
Independent	Sahabudin Miya	1,844	1.03	
NOTA	None of the above	2,006	1.12	+0.5
Majority		15,225	8.53	−6.09
Turnout		178,400	57.89	+8.8
BJP gain from RJD		Swing		

=== 2020 ===
2020 Bihar Legislative Assembly election: Shahpur
Party	Candidate	Votes	%	±%
RJD	Rahul Tiwari	64,393	41.14	−6.62
Independent	Shobha Devi W/O Visheshwar Ojha	41,510	26.52	
BJP	Munni Devi	21,355	13.64	−24.08
Independent	Gangadhar Pandey	3,836	2.45	
Rashtriya Jan Jan Party	Harendra Singh	3,571	2.28	
Independent	Bhuteshwar Yadav	2,876	1.84	
RLSP	Ved Prkash	2,689	1.72	
JP	Santosh Kumar Srivastav	2,522	1.61	
Independent	Kumar Avinash Chandra	2,060	1.32	
Independent	Krishna Ram	2,004	1.28	
NOTA	None of the above	978	0.62	−1.2
Majority		22,883	14.62	+4.58
Turnout		156,528	49.09	−0.5
RJD hold		Swing		

=== 2015 ===
2015 Bihar Legislative Assembly election: Shahpur
Party	Candidate	Votes	%	±%
RJD	Rahul Tiwari	69,315	47.76	
BJP	Visheshwar Ojha	54,745	37.72	
JAP(L)	Krishna Bihari Singh	3,680	2.54	
Independent	Sachin Kumar Gupta	2,914	2.01	
Independent	Radha Bihari Ojha	2,337	1.61	
BSP	Mithiles Choubey	2,129	1.47	
Independent	Binod Kumar Tiwary	1,803	1.24	
Samras Samaj Party	Lal Bahadur Mahato	1,310	0.9	
NOTA	None of the above	2,641	1.82	
Majority		14,570	10.04	
Turnout		145,144	49.59	

== Notable Incident ==
- Following the encounter, several activists and supporters described Bharat Bhushan Tiwari as a modern-day Mangal Pandey, arguing that his death could become a symbol of resistance against perceived injustices in governance. The incident attracted significant public attention and sparked protests in parts of Bihar and other regions.
