= Abdul Malik Jaber =

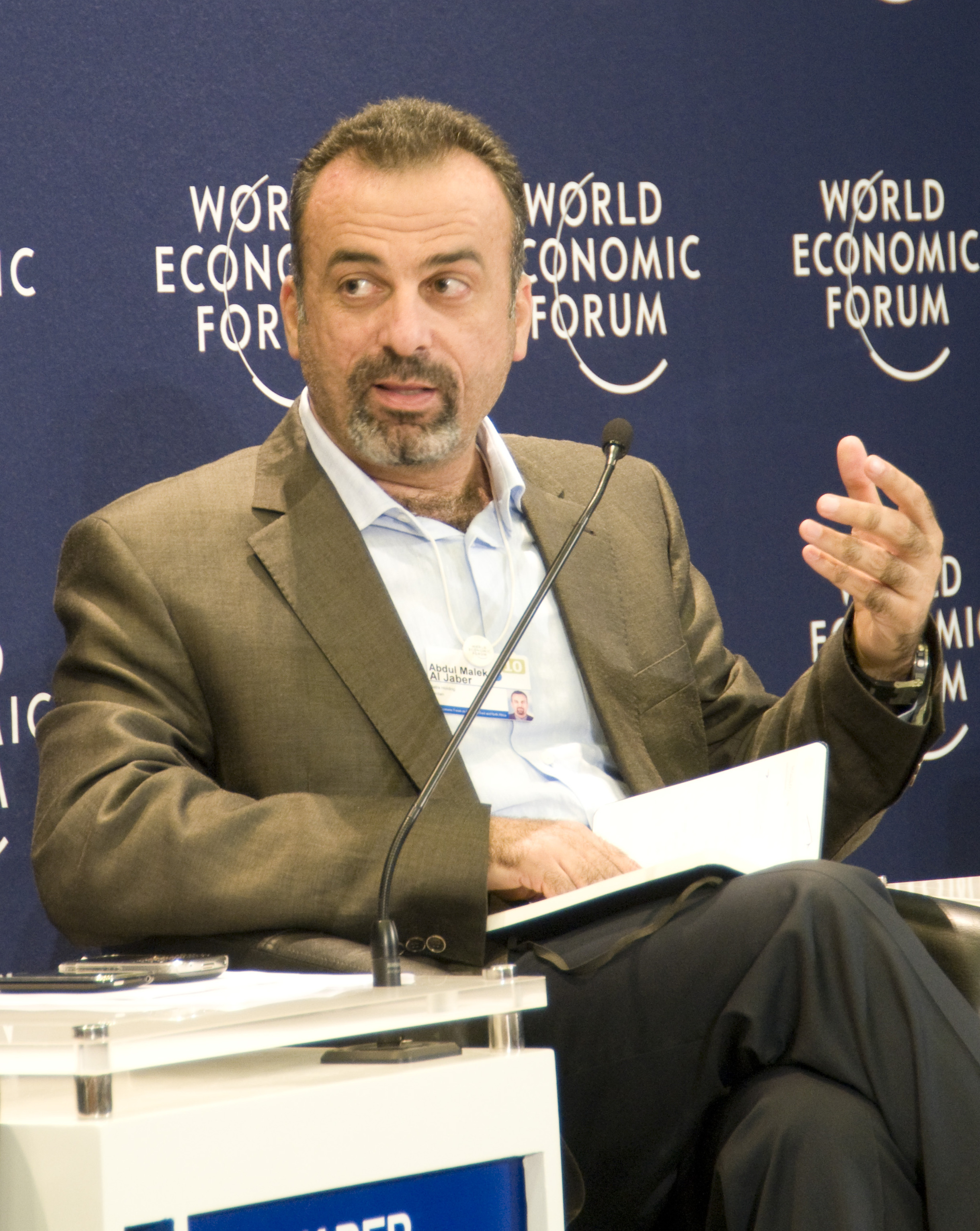
Al-Jaber at the World Economic Forum on the Middle East in 2010

Abdul Malik Al-Jaber is a Palestinian businessman. He was the CEO of Zain Jordan, the country's leading telecommunications provider for two years to July 2011, and is a member of the board of the World Economic Forum.

== Early life and education ==
Al-Jaber is a graduate of Berzeit University, McGill University in Canada, the Northwestern University-Kellogg School of Business Administration in Chicago, and the International School of Management in Paris. He holds a DBA, MBA as well as a MSc and PhD in Engineering.

== Public sector ==
Al-Jaber returned to Palestine from Canada—where he had gone to university—with the onset of the Oslo peace process in 1993, during which time he joined the peace negotiations as part of the Palestinian Technical Committees headed by Faisal Husseini.

Al-Jaber established the first Palestinian Energy Research Center, which was tasked with providing strategic plans for the energy sector in Palestine. Under a presidential decree, Al-Jaber became head of the center, after which he also acted as principal advisor for the Ministry of Planning. Al-Jaber's tenure in the public sector also included assuming responsibility for the Palestinian Industrial Estate Authority as director general.

== Private sector ==
In 2000, Al-Jaber moved to the private sector and held several senior positions. He became the CEO of the Palestinian Industrial Estates Development Company, during which he supervised the establishment of Palestine's first industrial estate in Gaza.

He was vice chairman of the board and CEO of the Paltel Group since 2003. In this position, Al-Jaber restructured the company towards increased profits and sustained innovation and social responsibility. He increased the company's profits from US$15 million in 2003 to US$100 million in 2005. The company has met its growth targets ever since; its stock dominates the Palestine Stock Exchange.

Additionally, the Paltel Group became the first Palestinian company to pioneer the practice of Corporate Social Responsibility. They introduced sustainability practice and reporting as per the GRI Standards, and created the first corporate foundation in the country. The Paltel Group Foundation assists Palestinian society via initiatives in education, supporting creativity and excellence, and making the benefits of ICT available to different segments of society. The foundation also sponsors the Palestine International Award for Excellence and Creativity, Palestine's first international award, which is chaired by Al-Jaber.

In 2005, Al-Jaber helped found VTEL Holdings, a UAE based company with US$1 billion in capital from high-net-worth investors from Palestine and the Arab World. VTEL's business objectives were to obtain licenses to operate ICT projects worldwide including CSR countries, Africa, Central America and Latin America, and the Caribbean. As of 2010 the company has operations in Ukraine, Georgia, Armenia, Iraq, Kurdistan, Jordan and Burundi in Africa.

Al-Jaber was appointed CEO of Zain Jordan and Zain Levant in July 2009. As CEO of Zain Jordan, the country's leading telecommunications provider, Jaber turned around the operations and achieved more than 9% growth. He remained in the position until 2011.

Al-Jaber is co-founder of Ramallah-based Al Rafah Bank (currently The National Bank), the first Microfinance bank in the region.

== Current activities ==
As of 2010, Al-Jaber chairs several companies in Palestine, including the Golden Wheat Mills Company, Wassel Logistics and is on the board of Al Rafah Bank. He is also the chairman of Al-Mashreq Real Estate Company, Hadara Technologies, and Hulul Business Solutions.

Al-Jaber is active in peace building and regional economic cooperation projects, and is a member of the board of several business associations and business councils including the Arab Business Council, the World Economic Forum, the Arab Technology Forum and the Young Presidents' Organization. He is also a founder of the Young Arab Leaders (YAL) chapter in Palestine, and is a regional board member of the YAL Organization in Dubai with chapters in Lebanon, Bahrain, Saudi Arabia, Jordan, Kuwait, Qatar and the UAE. He is also a member of the Board of Cairo Amman Bank in Jordan, and is a member of its audit committee. He is a member of the executive committee of Ayla Jordan, and the executive committee for Astra Group Jordan, which is considered one of the most important investment holdings in the Kingdom, with investments in tourism, insurance, real estate, and agriculture. Al-Jaber is also a member of the Board of Directors of the Palestine Trade Center, Paltrade.

== Awards and recognition ==
Al-Jaber was a recipient of His Highness Sheikh Mohammed bin Rashid Al Maktoum "Best Arab Manager Award for Excellence in Management" in 2001, as the leading business executive in Palestine.
