= Garaiyan, Bhojpur =

Garaiyan Gareyān
- Village
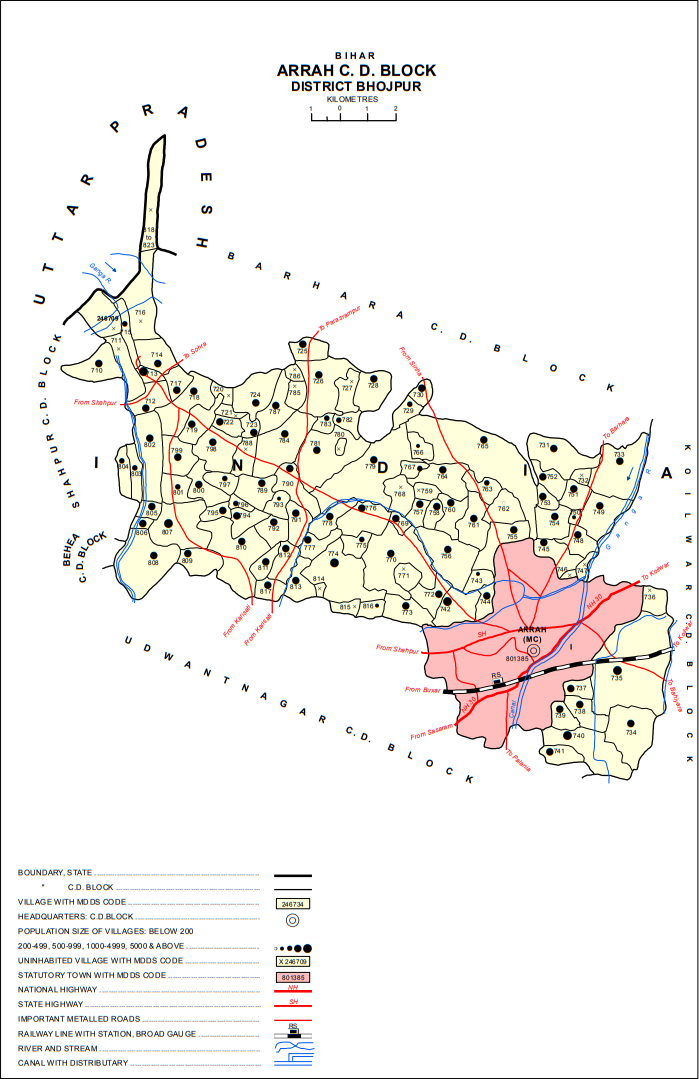
- Map of Garaiyan (#762) in Arrah block

- Location in Bihar, India Garaiyan (India)
- Coordinates: 25.60348°N 84.65752°E
- Country: India
- State: Bihar
- District: Bhojpur

Area
  - Total: 0.147 km^{2} (0.057 sq mi)
- Elevation: 63 m (207 ft)

Population (2011)
  - Total: 2
  - Density: 14/km^{2} (35/sq mi)

Languages
  - Official: Bhojpuri, Hindi
- Time zone: UTC+5:30 (IST)

Garaiyan, also spelled Gareyan or Gariyan, is a small village in Arrah block of Bhojpur district, Bihar, India. As of 2011, its population was 2, in 1 household, making it the least populous village in Bhojpur district.
