= Sumitra Devi (politician) =

Indian politician based in Bihar

Member of Bihar Legislative Assembly
- In office 1972–1980
- Constituency: Arrah
- In office 1962–1969
- Constituency: Arrah
- In office 1957–1962
- Constituency: Jagdishpur
- In office 1952–1957
- Constituency: Jagdishpur

Personal details
- Born: Munger, Bihar, India.
- Party: Indian National Congress
- Other political affiliations: Radical Democratic Party (India); Janata Party
- Spouse: Gyaneshwar Prasad
- Children: Manjul Kumar; Anshul Avijit (grandson)

Sumitra Devi (September 25, 1922 – February 3, 2001) was an Indian National Congress politician from Bihar. She was first elected to Bihar Legislative Assembly in 1952 from Jagdishpur. In 1963, she became the first woman cabinet minister of Bihar. She was also the first Bihari woman to become a cabinet minister in Government of India in 1977. Devi was born in Munger district on September 25, 1922, and died on February 3, 2001. She has served 4 times as MLA of Arrah from 1962 to 1969 and 1972 to 1980. Apart from this, she was also elected once from Piro Assembly constituency (Tarari Assembly constituency) in 1957. In 1977, she participated in Indian General elections from Balia Lok Sabha constituency as an independent candidate, but she was defeated.

== Personal life ==
Devi was born to Siddheshwar Prasad in a Kushwaha (Koeri) family of Bihar. She was married to late Shri Gyaneshwar Prasad. They had two sons (Manjul Kumar and Raj Shekhar) and a daughter. She is the mother-in-law of Meira Kumar, a former Lok Sabha speaker.

== Life and political career ==
Devi was sent to Kanya Gurukul, Sasni (Hathras) for her basic education by her father Siddheshwar Prasad, who was a supporter of the women's right to education. She completed her matriculation in 1936 and became a student of English literature for the higher education. As per the prevalent social norms of early marriage in her society, she was married to Gyaneswar Prasad at an early age. Her husband Gyaneswar Prasad was a freedom fighter and a student of law. Devi was married in Jagdishpur region of the Bhojpur district.

Devi participated in Non-Cooperation movement and launched a struggle for the welfare of the women of Backward Castes. She was supported by her husband in this initiative and latter allowed her to pursue her political ambitions. In the meantime, she was attracted towards the ideology of Communist leader M. N. Roy. She joined the newly floated party by Roy called Radical Democratic Party (India). Devi now started working for the masses and became popular in the political circle. In 1939, she was nominated to the 'committee on education' in the Shahabad District council. As a member of this committee, she started working for the schooling needs of the poor and unprivileged. Due to her initiatives, many schools were opened in distant areas for the education of poor. In 1942, she became a member of Arrah Municipal corporation.

Due to her social outreach, the Indian National Congress leadership of Bihar wanted her association with their party. In the meantime, her son Manjul Kumar was born. In 1946, in the legislative assembly elections, she went for filing her nomination as a candidate of Radical Democratic Party from Patna City constituency against the Indian National Congress. However, after Indian independence, her party, the Radical Democratic Party was merged into the Congress, and she became a member of Congress.

Devi won the legislative assembly elections of 1952, 1957 and 1962 with good margins as a candidate of Indian National Congress from Jagdishpur and then Arrah Assembly constituency. Her constituency Jagdishpur was famed for production of foodgrains, especially Paddy. In this region, during her tenure as Member of Legislative Assembly, a movement started by the agricultural labourers for fair and living wages. Devi became a leader of this movement, and her social outreach was broadened further. In 1960, she was appointed as secretary of Indian National Congress's Parliamentary Board. In 1963, she became the first women cabinet minister in Bihar. She was given the portfolio of Information and Broadcasting ministry as well as the ministry dealing with Family Planning.

Devi was liked by many because of her outspoken personality. One such person was Chuva Mahto, a wealthy person from Biharsharif, who made her an heir of his property. Devi used this property for opening a college for the poor. This college called "Kisan Mahavidya Sohsarai" is located in Nalanda district of Bihar. After 1975 Emergency, she resigned from the Congress and became a member of Congress for Democracy, an organisation which was against the Emergency. In 1977, she became victorious in the Indian General Elections as a candidate of Janata Party and was made a minister in Government of India. She was made Minister for Urban Development.

As Urban Development minister, Devi provided financial assistance to Sulabh International and with the help of its founder Bindeshwar Pathak, she launched a program for establishment of toilet facilities in Bihar's unserved areas. In 1980, she rejoined the Congress party and in 1985 Bihar Legislative Assembly elections, she was elected as a member of Congress. She was close to Jagjivan Ram from her early days in Congress. Later, her son Manjul Kumar was married to daughter of Jagjivan Ram, Meira Kumar.

== Legacy ==
The death anniversary of Devi remains the occasion for congregation of the leaders from all notable political parties of Bihar. An organisation called "Kushwaha Kalyan Parishad" celebrates the occasion periodically. This program witnesses the attendance of leaders like Samrat Chaudhary, Alok Kumar Mehta and Meira Kumar.

Devi also planned a layout of the Patna city and she led establishment of famous Maurya Lok, which is considered as one of the first shopping complex in the city.

== See also ==
- Rati Lal Prasad Verma
- Loknath Mahto
- Ajit Kumar Mehta
- Baidyanath Prasad Mahto
