= Amrendra Pratap Singh =

Indian politician

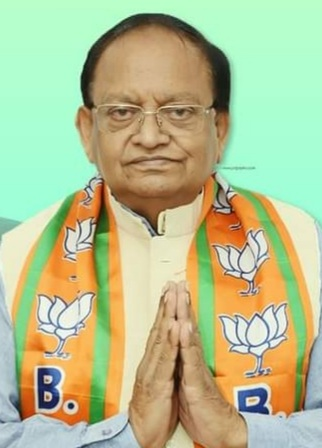

Minister of Agriculture Government of Bihar
- In office 16 November 2020 – 9 August 2022
- Chief Minister: Nitish Kumar
- Preceded by: Prem Kumar

Minister of Co-operative Government of Bihar
- In office 16 November 2020 – 9 February 2021
- Chief Minister: Nitish Kumar
- Preceded by: Rana Randhir
- Succeeded by: Subhash Singh

Minister of Sugarcane Industries Government of Bihar
- In office 16 November 2020 – 9 February 2021
- Chief Minister: Nitish Kumar
- Preceded by: Bima Bharti
- Succeeded by: Pramod Kumar

Deputy Speaker of Bihar Legislative Assembly
- In office 2012–2015
- Speaker: Uday Narayan Choudhary

Member of Bihar Legislative Assembly
- In office 2020–2025
- Preceded by: Mohammad Nawaz Alam
- Succeeded by: Sanjay Singh Tiger
- Constituency: Arrah
- In office 2000–2015
- Preceded by: Abdul Malik
- Succeeded by: Mohammad Nawaz Alam
- Constituency: Arrah

Personal details
- Born: 20 July 1947 (age 78) Chaugain, Bihar, British India
- Party: Bharatiya Janata Party
- Parent: Harihar Singh (father)

Amrendra Pratap Singh is an Indian politician and a member of the Bihar Legislative Assembly serving as a minister in the Government of Bihar. He is the son of Harihar Singh, the former Chief Minister of Bihar.

== Early and personal life ==
Singh was born in Chaugain village of the Shahabad district (now in Buxar) to Harihar Singh also known as Bihari Ji Singh. His father was a freedom fighter and the Chief Minister of Bihar and his elder brother Mrigendra Pratap Singh was the Finance minister and speaker of the Jharkhand Legislative Assembly.

== Political career ==
Singh joined Jana Sangh in the state of Bihar as an associate of Raghubar Das, former Chief Minister of Jharkhand. Inspired by Jayaprakash Narayan, he also took part in the JP Movement. After split of the Jana Sangh faction from Janata Party, he too joined the newly formed Bharatiya Janata Party. He was granted candidacy by the BJP to contest six consecutive elections of which he got elected on four occasions. Between 2000 and 2015, he was the representative of the Arrah constituency. He was also made the deputy speaker of the assembly from 2012 to 2015. In the 2015 Bihar Legislative Assembly election, he lost his seat to Mohammad Nawaz Alam of the RJD. He won his seat back in the 2020 Bihar Legislative Assembly election on a BJP ticket supported by NDA defeating his nearest rival of MGB with an impressive margin. He was appointed a Cabinet Minister in the Seventh Nitish Kumar ministry for the first time.

== See also ==
- Arrah (194)
- 2015 Bihar Legislative Assembly election
- 2020 Bihar Legislative Assembly election
