= Gothahula =

- Village
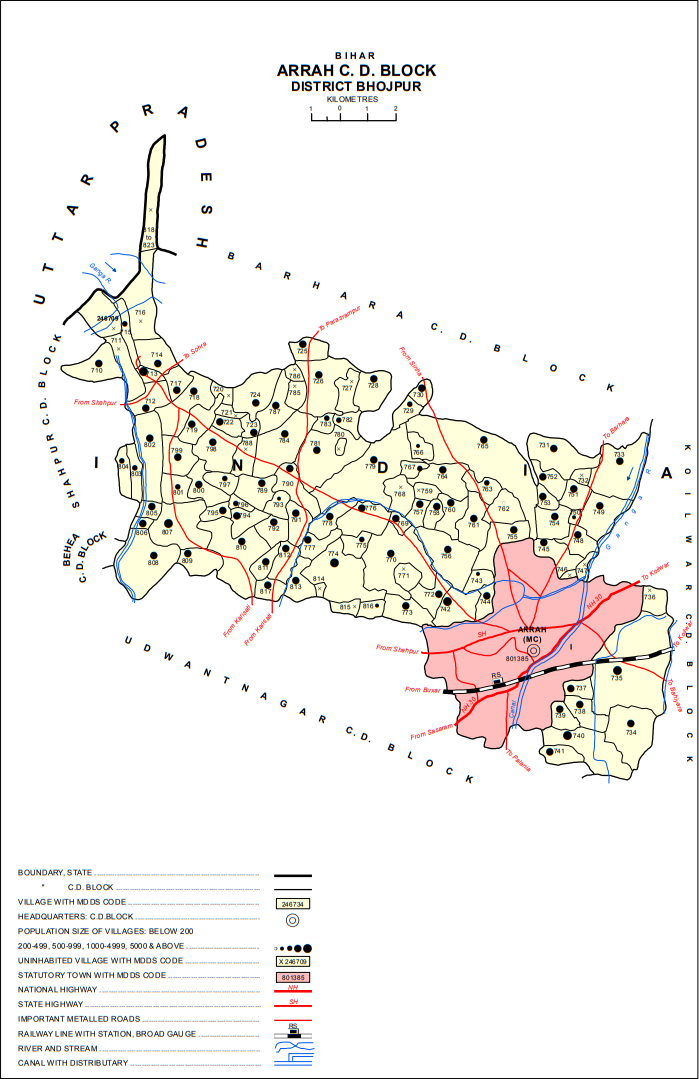
- Map of Gothahula (#740) in Arrah block

- Location in Bihar, India Gothahula (India)
- Coordinates: 25.53051°N 84.6907°E
- Country: India
- State: Bihar
- District: Bhojpur

Area
  - Total: 0.295 km^{2} (0.114 sq mi)
- Elevation: 64 m (210 ft)

Population (2011)
  - Total: 5,548
  - Density: 18,800/km^{2} (48,700/sq mi)

Languages
  - Official: Bhojpuri, Hindi
- Time zone: UTC+5:30 (IST)

Gothahula is a village in the southeastern part of Arrah block in Bhojpur district, Bihar, India. As of 2011, its population was 5,488, in 922 households.
