= Ramanand Tiwary =

Indian politician

Ramanand Tiwary was an Indian politician and member of Lok Sabha. He was elected to the Lok Sabha in 1977 from Buxar as a Janata Party candidate. Earlier he served as Police minister and home minister of Bihar from 1967 to 1971. He was associated with socialist parties and was member of the Bihar Legislative Assembly from 1952 to 1972 from Shahpur Assembly seat.

== Early life and education ==
Ramanand Tiwari was son of late Shri Nathum Tiwary and born at Ramdihana Village, Bhojpur District in 1909. He got education up to Primary standard. He got married with Smt. Sulakshana Devi in 1936. He was father of 3 sons and 1 daughter. Krishnand Tiwary, Shivanand Tiwary, Umanand Tiwary and Gita Tiwary. Shivanand Tiwari is RJD leader. He was a Political and social worker.

== Special Achievements ==
His name was also in "Guiness book of world record" for creation of Bihar police and jail mess association.

== Political association ==
He was associated with: (i) The Congress Socialist Party, (ii) Socialist Party, (iii) Praja Socialist Party and (iv) Samyukta Socialist Party time to time.

== Position Held ==
president (i) Bihar Samyukta-Socialist Party, 1967 and (ii) Bihar Socialist Party till its merger with the Janata Party; Chairman, (i) Bihar Police and Jail-men's Association, (ii) All-India Telegraphs Union for 15 years, (iii) Bengal Coal Congress Mazdoor Union and (iv) Rashtriya Nav-Nirman Mazdoor Sabha; Member, Bihar Legislative Assembly, 1952—72; Home Minister in the Bihar State, 1967 and 1971.

== Social activities ==
Set up Ramdiha Middle School and High School, Boria.

== Publications ==
About 20 books on Police and Jail employees; main work, 'Hamara Kasoor, Tatha, Sipahion ki Kahani Ankron Ki Jawani'.
