= Bashistha Narain Singh =

Indian politician

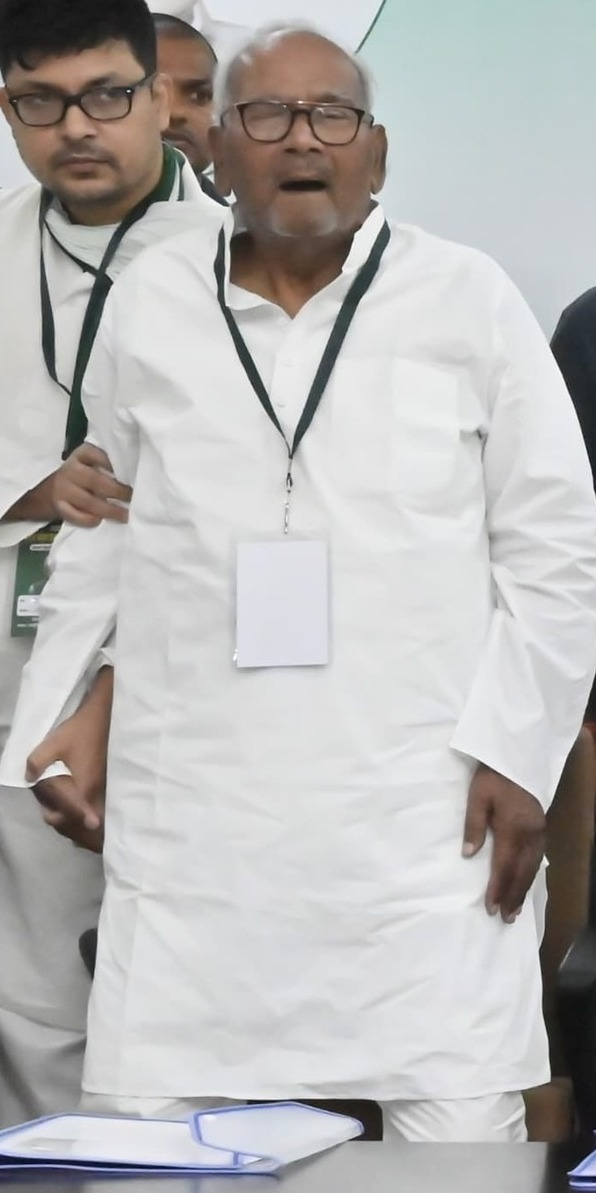

Member of Parliament, Rajya Sabha
- In office 3 April 2012 – 2 April 2024
- Succeeded by: Sanjay Kumar Jha
- Constituency: Bihar

Personal details
- Born: 24 October 1947 (age 78) Hajipur, Bihar, India
- Party: Janata Dal (United)
- Other political affiliations: Janata Party; Janata Dal; Samata Party
- Spouse: Hewanti Singh
- Children: One son and two daughters
- Education: M.A. (History) Educated at Patna University
- Profession: Agriculturist

Bashistha Narain Singh, is a politician from Janata Dal (United). He is a Member of the Parliament of India representing Bihar in the Rajya Sabha, the upper house of the Indian Parliament. He had served as Bihar state President of Janata Dal (United), the ruling party of the state. In January 2021, he was succeeded by Umesh Kushwaha to the post of Bihar state chief of JD (U). Previously, he was a member of Samata Party (Uday Mandal is current National President) and was the President Bihar Samata Party from 1995 to 1998.

== Political career ==
Singh was imprisoned several times during the Bihar movement. During Indian Emergency, he was imprisoned for nineteen months. In 1977, He was administered the oath at Shaheed Smarak, Patna to the members of the newly constituted Bihar Vidhan Sabha who were associated with the J.P. Movement. He was General Secretary of Bihar Janata Party from 1980 to 1985. He was a member of the Executive Committee Bihar Janata Dal from 1989 to 1990 then was the Member of Parliamentary Board, Janata Dal from 1990 to 1994. In 1994, he joined Samta Party formed by George Fernandes and Nitish Kumar and was the President Bihar Samata Party from 1995 to 1998.

== Election History ==
=== Rajya Sabha ===
Position	Party	Constituency	From	To	Tenure
Member of Parliament, Rajya Sabha (1st Term)	SAP	Bihar	10 April 2002	9 April 2008	5 years, 365 days
Member of Parliament, Rajya Sabha (2nd Term)	JD(U)	Bihar	3 April 2012	2 April 2018	5 years, 364 days
Member of Parliament, Rajya Sabha (3rd Term)	JD(U)	Bihar	3 April 2018	2 April 2024	5 years, 365 days
