= Jain Siddhant Bhawan =

Jain Oriental library in Arrah, Bihar, India

- 25.56215989996678°N 84.67329461826309°E
- Location: Arrah, India
- Type: Oriental Library
- Established: 1903

Collection
- Items collected: Books, manuscripts, paintings

Building details

General information
- Status: Completed
- Architectural style: Jain
- Location: India
- Construction started: 1903

Other information
- Parking: No

Jain Siddhant Bhawan (also known as Shree Dev Kumar Jain Oriental Library) is a Jain Oriental library in Arrah. It has a good collection of old palm leaf manuscripts.

== History ==
It was established by Dev Kumar Jain in 1903. One day he saw a person selling old and rare books; to save those books he bought them and started collecting old and rare books. Nearly four decades ago it started coming under Magadh University and later after the establishment of Veer Kunwar Singh University it was associated with it.

== Collection ==
It has a great collection of 25,000 printed books and 8,000 handwritten books in various languages like Bhojpuri, Tamil, Gujarati, Pali, Magadhi Prakrit, English, Kannada, etc.
