= Maharaja College =

Maharaja College or Maharaja's College may refer to these colleges in India named after the maharajas of Indian princely states:

- Maharaja College, Arrah, Bihar
- Maharaja's College, Kochi, Ernakulam, Kerala
- Maharajah's College, Vizianagaram, Andhra Pradesh
- Maharaja College, Jaipur, Rajasthan
- Maharaja's College, Mysore, Karnataka
- His Highness Maharaja's University College now University College Thiruvananthapuram, Thiruvananthapuram, Kerala

== See also ==
- Maharaja Agrasen College, Delhi, named after the legendary Indian king Agrasen
