= Maulabagh, Arrah =

Neighbourhood in Arrah, Bihar, India

Maulabagh is a mahalla or neighbourhood in the city of Arrah in the Bhojpur district of Bihar, India.

== Etymology ==
According to sources on Arrah's history, the name Maulabagh originates from a Muslim lady of the same name.

== History ==
The history of Maulabagh as a neighbourhood is evident from the early 19th century sources. A historical landmark, the Maula Bagh Masjid (also called Bibi Jaan Mosque), was built in the area in 1814. The mosque was built by Beebee Mhoboob Buxsh, the Muslim wife of John Deane, an official of the East India Company's service, who was appointed Collector of Shahabad on September 21, 1797. The mosque is attached to the Maulā Bāgh Endowment, the garden outside the mosque, where Deane was buried by his wife. Dean died in Arrah on September 24, 1817.

Around the year 1900, Maulabagh was officially documented in administrative records as a mahalla within Ward No. 2 of the Arrah municipality.

== Administration ==
Today, Maulabagh falls under the ward no. 13 in the jurisdiction of the Arrah Municipal Corporation.

== See also ==
- Arrah
- Bhojpur district
