= Parashanatha temple, Arrah =

Jain temple in Bihar, India

Religion
- Affiliation: Jainism
- Deity: Parshvanatha
- Festival: Mahavir Jayanti

Location
- Location: Arrah, Bihar
- Interactive map of Parashanatha temple, Arrah
- Coordinates: 25°33′42″N 84°40′23″E

Architecture
- Established: 1819 CE
- Temple: 3

Parashanatha Temple is a Jain temple dedicated to Parasnath in Masarh village near Arrah in Bihar.

== About temple ==
It was built by Babu Shankar Lal of Arrah in 1819 CE, a Inscription in the temple reads that this temple is dedicated to a citizen of Aramnagar (perhaps the old name of Arrah There are statues of 8 prominent Jain figures are in the temple along with seven dated Jain inscriptions. A 600 old Jain inscription in the temple of Parshvanatha has mentioned this place as Mahāsāra.
