= Arrah =

Arrah Ara
- City
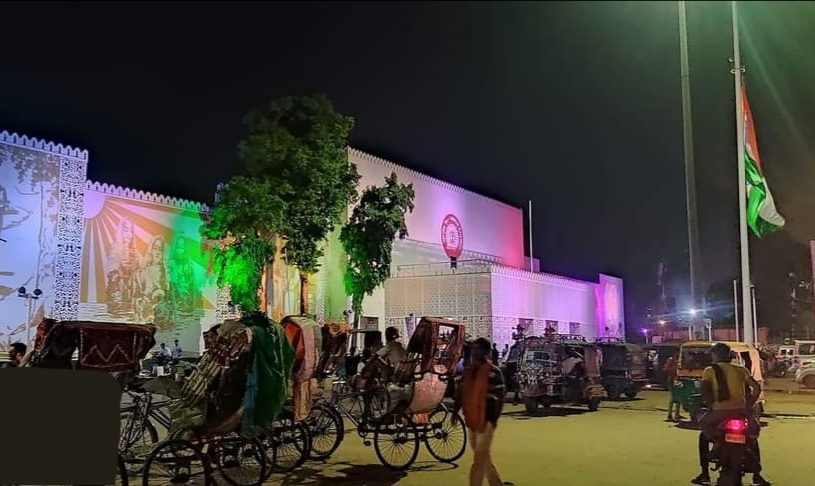
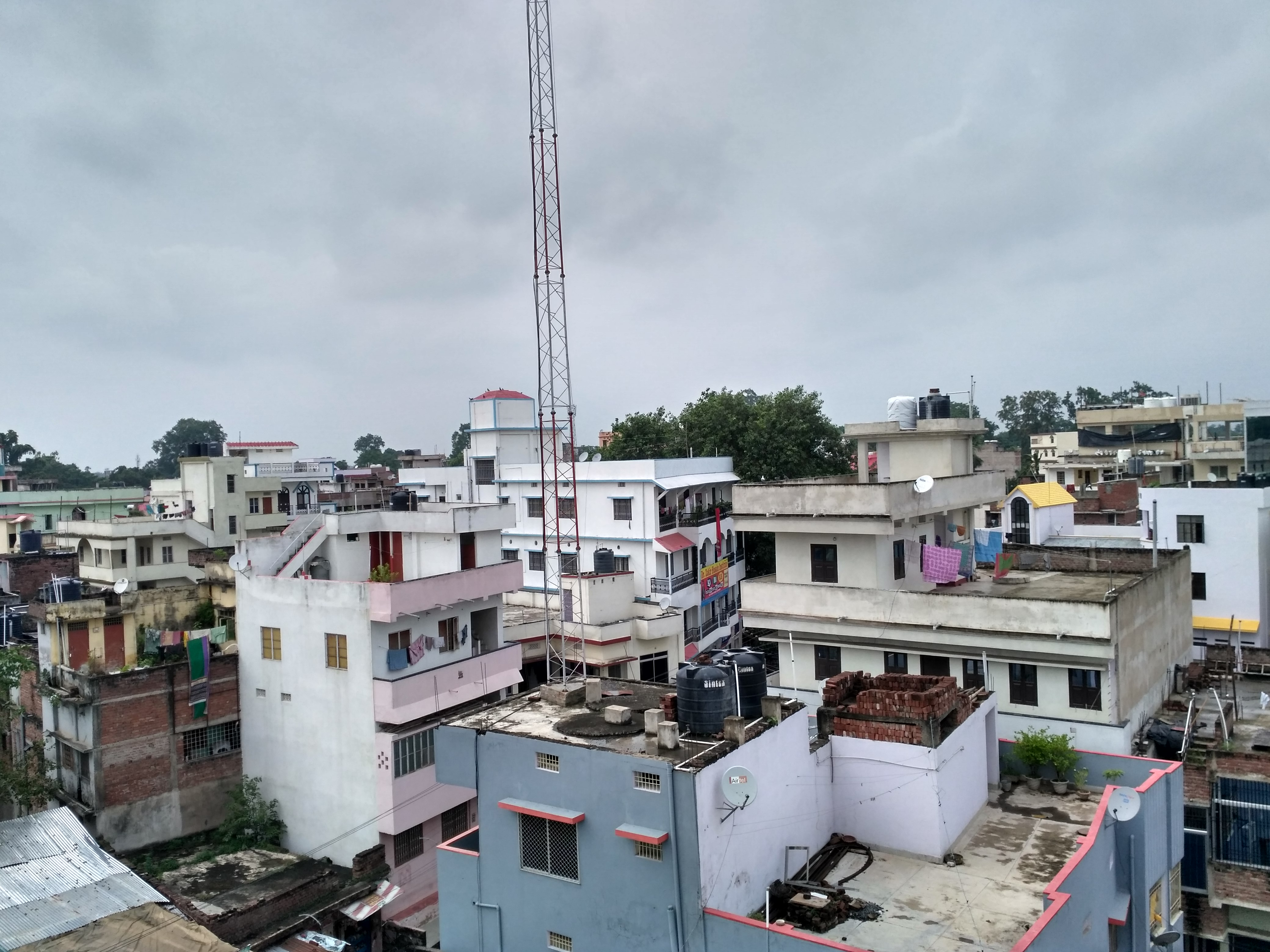
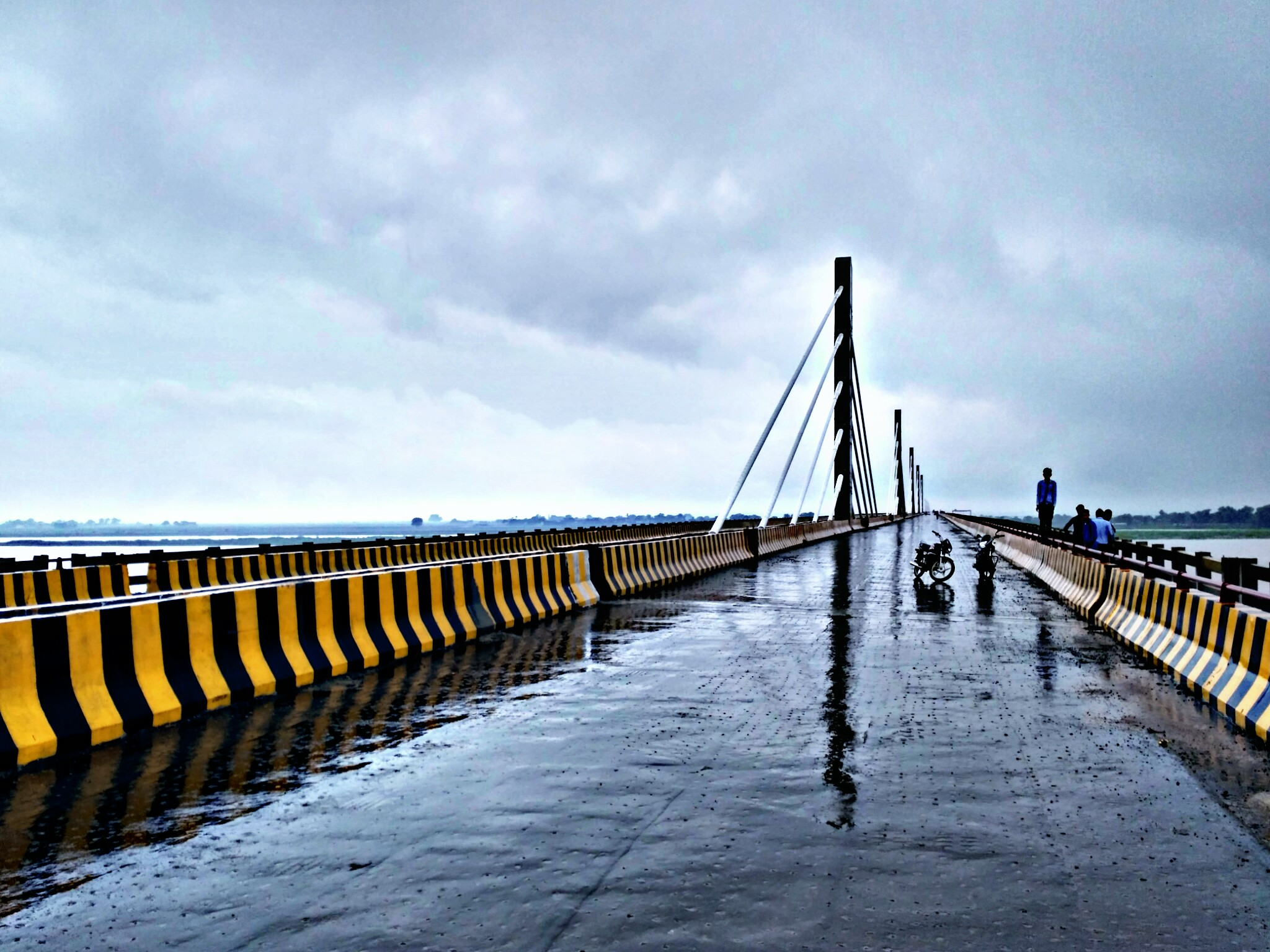
- Prominent places of Ara

- Location in Bihar, India
- Coordinates: 25°33′05″N 84°39′37″E
- Country: India
- State: Bihar
- Division: Patna
- District: Bhojpur
- Named for: Aranya Devi

Government
  - Type: Municipal Corporation
  - Body: Arrah Municipal Corporation
  - Mayor: Indu Devi
  - MP: Sudama Prasad
  - MLA: Sanjay Singh Tiger

Area
  - Metro: 49 km^{2} (19 sq mi)

Population (2011)
  - City: 261,430
- Demonym: Bhojpuriya

Language
  - Official: Hindi
  - Additional official: Urdu
  - Regional: Bhojpuri
- Time zone: UTC+5:30 (IST)
- PIN Code: 802301, 802302 & 802312, 802313
- Telephone code: +91-6182
- Vehicle registration: BR-03
- Railway Station: Ara Junction

Arrah (also spelled as Arra, Arah, transliterated as Ara) is a city, a municipal corporation and the administrative headquarters of Bhojpur district (formerly known as Shahabad district) in the Indian state of Bihar. During British Raj, it served as the administrative headquarters and was considered the most populous urban centre of the historical Shahabad district. It is the headquarters of Bhojpur district, located near the confluence of the Ganges and Sone rivers, some 24 miles (39 km) from Danapur and 36 miles (58 km) from Patna.

The city holds an important position in Indian history, mainly because of its role in the Siege of Arrah, an important event during the Indian Rebellion of 1857. Today, Arrah is a cultural centre for the Bhojpuri speaking region of India. Its economy is driven by agriculture and the trade of building materials, mainly sand and bricks from the riverine plains.

== Etymology ==
=== Typonym ===
According to a Jain inscription found at Masarh village near the town, Arrah is mentioned there as Aramnagar (transl. City of Aramas). That "Aramnagar" later become "Arrah".

According to mythologies, the word "Arrah" or "Ara" is derived from the Sanskrit word Aranya, which means forest. It suggests that the entire area around modern Ara was heavily forested in the old days.

The name Shahabad ("city of the king") is also historically related to Arrah. This name is said to have originated with the Mughal emperor Babur in 1529. In his memoir, the Baburnama, Babur refers to the town he camped in as ārī or āre (آرِی). After a victory over local Afghan rulers, Babur established his camp at Arrah to proclaim his dominion over Bihar. The title "Shahabad" was reportedly first given to the town itself before the name was extended to encompass the entire district.

=== In mythologies ===
According to the Hindu epic Ramayana, sage Vishwamitra, the Guru of Rama, had his Ashram in the region of Arrah. It is also the area where Rama killed the demonness Taraka. In Mahabharata it was the home of the powerful demon called Bakra, whose daily food was human being supplied either by villages of Bakri or Chakrapur (or Ekchakra), as Arrah was then called. Pandava came to Ekchakra during their wandering and they were entertained by a Brahmin whose turn it was to supply a human for the demon. On hearing this, Bhima decided to go himself to the demon as he has eaten a Brahmin's salt, and killed the demon.

== History ==
=== Ancient ===
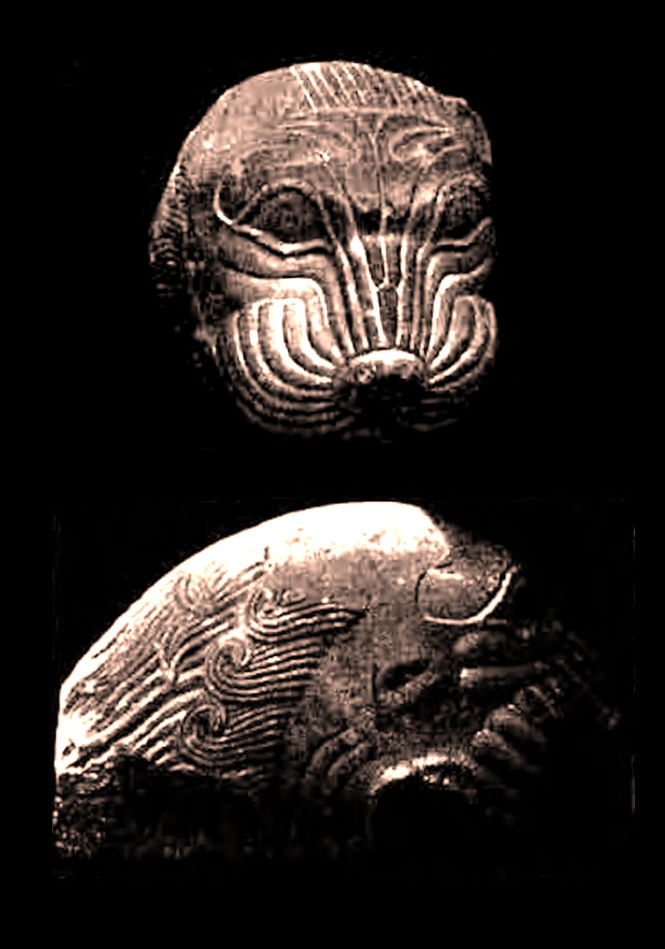
The Masarh lion, found at the archaeological site Masarh

The 7th-century Chinese explorer Xuanzang described a place he called Mo-ho-so-lo, which has been identified with the contemporary village of Masarh. He noted that the inhabitants were all Brāhmans who did not respect the law of Buddha, This opinion supports historical analysis that Buddhism, despite its prominence in the Magadha region, never gained a significant hold in the Shahabad district. Archaeological evidence strengthens this opinion, noting a contrast with the neighbouring district of Gaya; while Buddhist images and temples are numerous there, such remains almost disappear as soon as one crosses the Son River into the Arrah region. Xuanzang recounts that a stupa was built in Arrah by the emperor Asoka to commemorate the spot where the Buddha had converted a group of people whom he called "demons of the desert" who fed on human flesh.

In ancient India, it was the part of Magadha. In 684BC Arrah was the part of the region ruled by Haryanka dynasty. During Chandragupta Maurya Arrah was the part of the great Magadh empire. The Pillars of Ashoka are found at the Masarh village in Arrah town.

The region's inclusion in the Gupta Empire is established by an inscription at the Mundeshvari Temple referencing a ruling chief in 635 A.D. and another at Deo Barunarak talking about the later Gupta king Jivita Gupta II. After the decline of the Guptas, the area experienced a period of instability and relapsed into barbarism and anarchy, finally coming under the control of local aboriginal chiefs before the medieval era. Apart from such inscriptions, very early Hindu relics are almost as rare as Buddhist ones in the district, with few temples like Deo Barunark dating to a very early period.

It was also the part of the Pala Empire and the Chero empire. Bihiya and Tirawan were the capitals of Chief Ghughulia and Raja Sitaram Rai respectively. Colonial-era accounts note that while the Cheros had lost political dominance, their descendants were still present in the region, particularly concentrated in the Bihiya and the reclaimed jungles around Jagdispur. Historical sources also identify the Bhars and Savars as other principal early inhabitants of the larger Shahabad district.

=== Medieval ===
After the takeover of the region by Muhammad Bakhtiyar Khilji around 1193 A.D., the area of modern-day Arrah came under the nominal control of the Delhi Sultanate, though it was largely managed by local Rajput chiefs. For a period, it became part of the Jaunpur Kingdom in 1397 before being reclaimed by the rulers of Delhi. Historical accounts suggest that even into the Mughal era, the control of the central government was not stable, and local zamindars often acted with practical independence.

A major battle in the region's medieval history was the prolonged struggle between the indigenous Chero people and the immigrant Ujjainiya Rajputs, who arrived from Malwa in the 14th century. Led by Hunkar Shahi, the Ujjainiyas eventually displaced the Cheros, founding their territory as Bhojpur (Currenltly a village in Buxar district) in honour of their ancestor, Raja Bhoj. The struggle continued for centuries, with the Cheros temporarily recapturing the territory in 1607 before being defeated again by the Ujjainiyas in 1611. The power of the Cheros was finally broken in the 16th century when Sher Shah Suri dispatched his general, Khawás Khán, to subdue them, an act considered one of Sher Shah's major military accomplishments. In 1604 Chieftain Narayan Mal got a land grant from Jahangir. After that Raja Horil Singh shifted the capital to Dumrao and established Dumraon Raj.

In 1529, Babur conquered Bihar to subdue the local Afghan rulers and, after defeating the allied chiefs, he established his camp in Arrah to rejoice and assert his rule over the region. The Shahabad District Gazetteer records a local tradition identifying the place of his camp as being near the present-day Judge's Court. His personal memoirs record anecdotes from his time in the city, including riding out from his camp to see the local water lilies, whose seeds he noted resembled pistachio nuts.

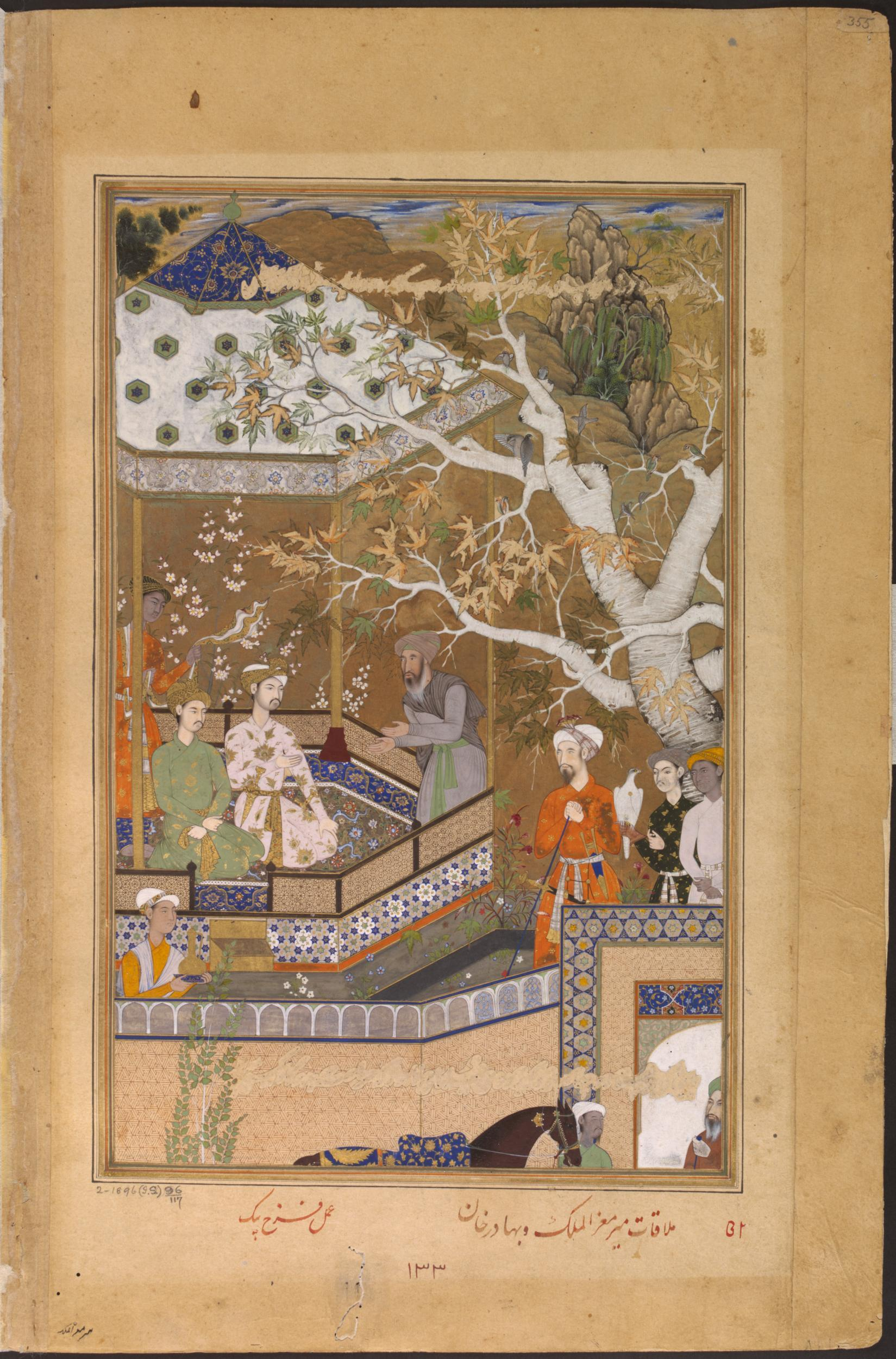
Meeting between Bahadur Khan and Akbar's negotiator Mu'izz al-Mulk (from Akbarnama)

During the Mughal Empire, Arrah was as an important pargana (administrative unit). During Akbar's rule, It was granted as a jagir (feudal land grant), first to Mi’r Mu’izzul-Mulk, who soon faced a rebellion in 1580 from other nobles in the province. Later when the jagirdar of Arrah was Farhat Khan, the town became a center of a major conflict with the local Ujjainiya chieftain, Gajpati. These rebels temporarily seized control of Arrah from Mi’r Mu’izzul-Mulk. According to Akbarnama, Mi’r Mu’izzul-Mulk granted an interview to another rebel, Bahádur, but took an uncompromising stance, stating that "his crimes could only be cleansed with blood". During this period, Unable to confront Gajpati's large force, Farhat Khan retreated in the fort at Arrah. The ensuing struggle involved battles near the fort and on the Sone River, which ultimately led to the deaths of both Farhat Khan and his son Farhang Khan.

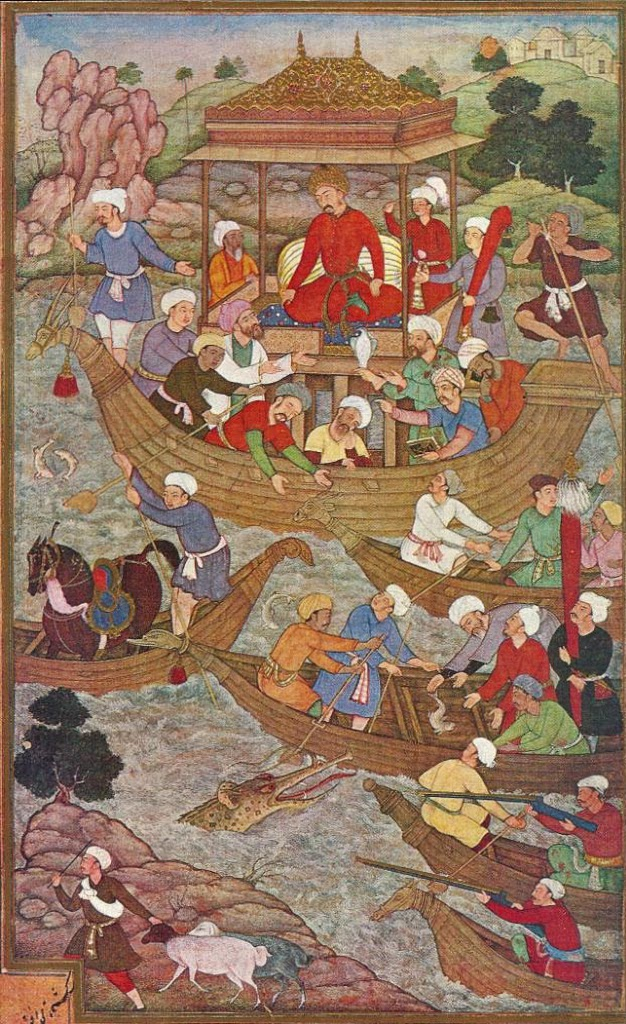
Babur crossing the Son River.

=== Modern ===
==== British Rule ====
Colonial-era ethnographers like George Abraham Grierson characterised the Bhojpuri-speaking people of the Shahabad district as having a strong warlike tradition. Grierson described them as an "alert and active nationality", noting that the region provided a "rich mine of recruitment" for the Bengal Army of the East India Company.

In spite of its role as the administrative center for the whole Shahabad district under British rule, Arrah's appropriateness for this position drew early disapproval. In a survey of the region in 1812-13, the British official Francis Buchanan documented his incomprehension over the choice, concluding that Arrah was not a center of trade, was hard to access, and was not salubrious (healthy). He suggested a complete administrative restructuring, proposing that a more central and healthier place for the courts could be found if the district's boundaries were redrawn along the natural barriers of the Ganges, Son, and Karmanasa rivers. His observations pointed to broader planning issues, as he also found that many police houses were awkwardly and non-centrally located within their respective subdivisions.

The 18th century, which saw the downfall of the Mughal Empire and the rise of Britishers, was a turbulent period for the region. The area around Arrah witnessed military campaigns, including a battle at Jagdispur in 1744, where the rebellious general of Alivardi Khan, Mustafá Khán, was defeated and killed. The following year, a large Maratha Army under Raghuji Bhonsle made a major incursion into Bihar, camping in the vicinity of the district. The local zamindars of Bhojpur often acted as independent powers; in 1762, when the Nawab of Bengal, Mir Qasim, marched to Shahabad to assert his authority, these zamindars resisted and then fled to seek refuge with the Nawab of Awadh. In 1764, the Nawab of Awadh, Shuja-ud-daula, led an army into Shahabad which caused widespread devastation, burning and plundering the countryside before entrenching itself at Buxar.

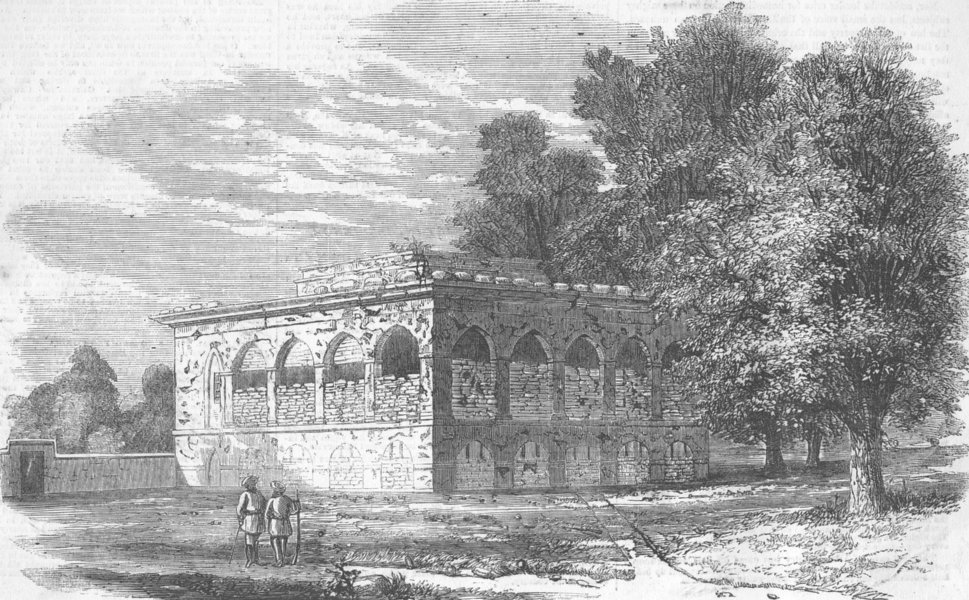
House at Arrah fortified against the Dinapore Mutineers – From a sketch by Sir Vincent Eyre, 1857 from the Illustrated London News (1857)

After the Battle of Buxar the British took control over Arrah. However, British control was not immediately secure. The area was affected by the revolt of Chait Singh, the Raja of Benares, in 1781. Chait Singh's family had previously seized parts of the north-western Shahabad district to establish a strategic base, and his rebellion continued the pattern of regional opposition to centralised authority.

==== Revolt of 1857 ====
According to historical accounts, after the outbreak of the rebellion in May 1857, the government officers in Arrah, including Magistrate Herwald Wake, resolved to remain in the town. A local railway engineer, Vicars Boyle, fortified a small two-storied building (present Arrah House) to serve as a defensive position. On 25 July, sepoy regiments that had mutinied at Dinapore reached Arrah and were joined by Kunwar Singh and his forces, which numbered around 2,000 men. The small European and Eurasian contingent, accompanied by 50 Sikh policemen, barricaded themselves inside Boyle's fortified house on 26 July and withstood a week-long siege.

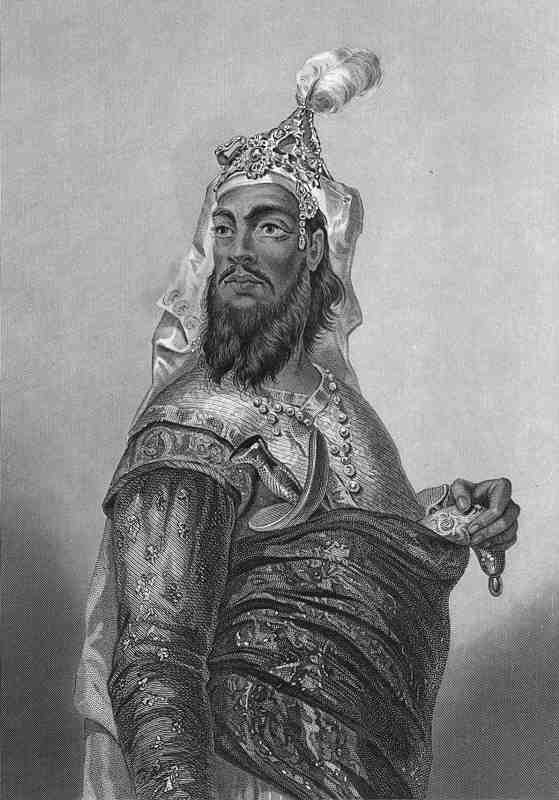
Kooer Singh

On 26 July, the small European and Eurasian contingent of roughly 16 individuals, accompanied by 50 Sikh policemen, barricaded themselves inside Boyle's fortified house. For a week, this garrison was besieged by a force estimated to be in the thousands. An initial British force of about 415 soldiers dispatched from Dinapore to end the siege was ambushed on 29 July. The force, whose white summer uniforms made them visible targets in the dark, was forced to retreat and sustained heavy casualties. During this retreat, two civilians, Ross Mangles and William Fraser McDonell, were recognised for their actions in saving the lives of wounded soldiers, and both were subsequently awarded the Victoria Cross.

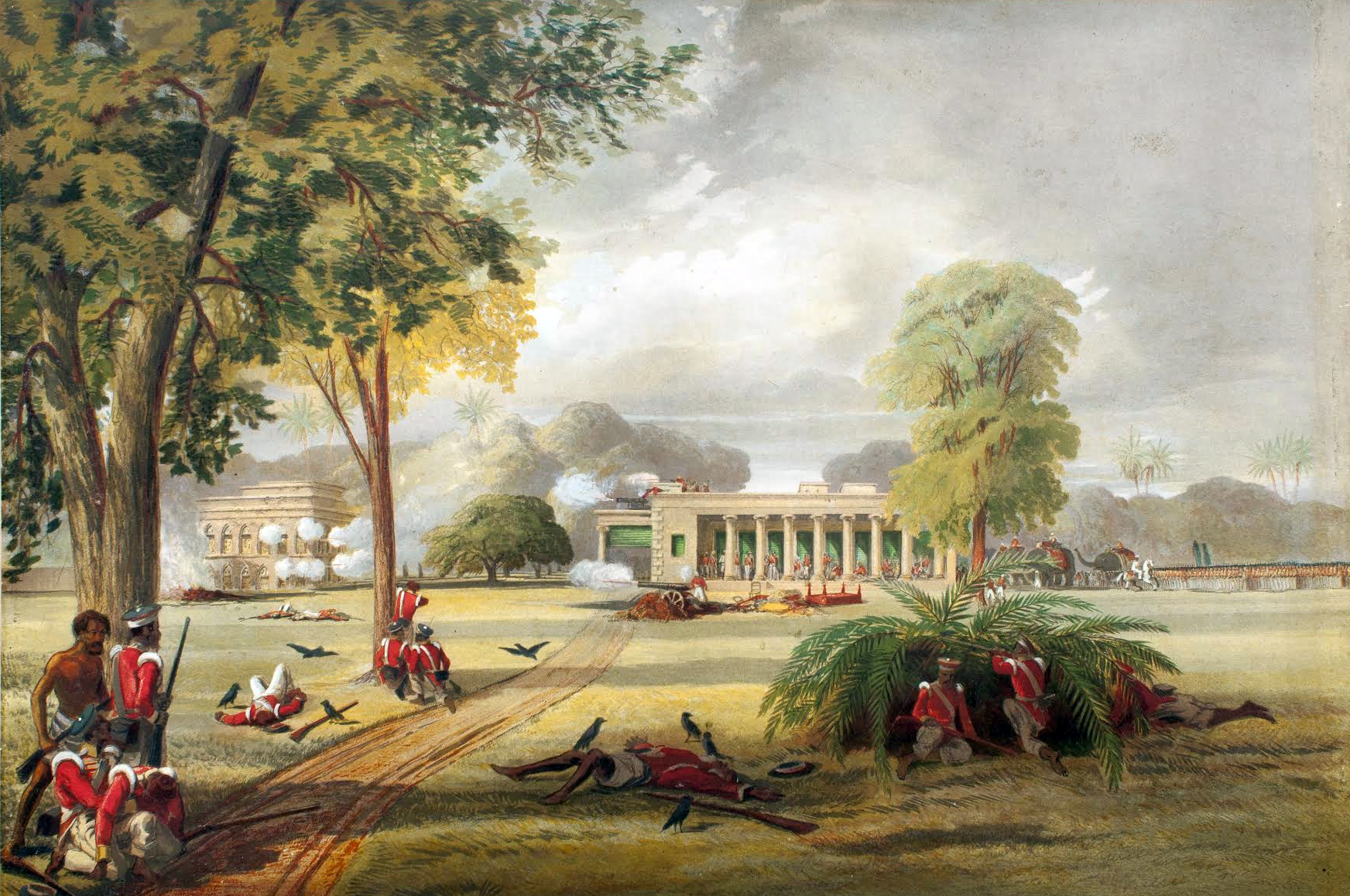
The siege of Arrah

The siege concluded on 2 August, when a second British force of around 150 soldiers and volunteers, led by Vincent Eyre, advanced from Buxar. Eyre's column engaged and defeated Kunwar Singh's army in a battle near the village of Gujrajganj and reached the besieged garrison

The relief of the Arrah house did not end the rebellion in the area. For several months afterward, the forces of Kunwar Singh remained in control of the countryside, particularly the jungles around Jagdispur. British campaigns to subdue them, first under Edward Lugard and later under General Douglas, were hampered by the difficult terrain and monsoon rains. During this period, rebel parties were highly active in the region and at one point swooped down upon Arrah, and fired a number of bungalows. The conflict in the district only subsided in October 1857, after a large-scale operation to encircle the rebels. Though the main body of Kunwar Singh's forces managed to break through the cordon and escape towards the Kaimur hills, they suffered heavy losses during a pursuit led by Henry Havelock.

==== Later 19th century ====
The latter half of the 19th century was marked by development of agriculture after the start of the Sone Canal System, which spurred a period of population growth in the district largely driven by an influx of immigrants. The late 19th and early 20th centuries were marked by significant demographic volatility due to famine, fever, and plague.

The city was affected by the fourth Cholera Pandemic. According to a 1873 report by the Civil Surgeon of Shahabad, J. H. Thornton, the disease first appeared in the town of Arrah on 7 May 1873. While its initial progress was slow, the cases increased after 20 June. The report provides figures for Arrah and its neighbouring villages (a total population of about 40,000 at the time). From 7 May until the report was written in late July, the town recorded 836 cases and 372 deaths. The period between 28 June and 19 July was the most devastating, accounting for a majority of the casualties. The epidemic also notably broke out in the Arrah jail on 25 June, which was the subject of a separate special report. Measures like burning sulphur fires were employed throughout the town but proved ineffective. The epidemic only began to abate with the arrival of the monsoon.

The district was affected by the famine of 1896-97, and fever was a persistent cause of high mortality. Plague, however, was particularly devastating to the urban population after its appearance in the district around 1901. In the year 1903, Arrah experienced an exceptionally high mortality rate of 53.56 per thousand residents. The primary driver of this was plague, which alone was responsible for a death rate of 35.04 per thousand in the town that year. This series of public health crises contributed to a notable decline in the city's population in the first decade of the 20th century. In 1911 the king of England George V visited Arrah and prayed at the Holy Saviour Church.

During this late 19th-century period, public health conditions in the town were noted as being more advanced than in surrounding rural areas, with Arrah being the only town in the district to possess a pure water-supply, though drainage remained an issue. The era also saw social upheaval, including an outburst of religious excitement in 1893-94 related to an anti-cow-killing agitation in the district.

== Geography ==
Arrah is located at the elevation of 192 m from the sea level at the bank of Son river, Ganga River and Gangi River. Arrah lies at the confluence of the Ganga and the Son River, other small rivers that flow in the town are Gangi River.

The Son River joins the Ganges about 10 miles north of Maner, at a point roughly halfway amid Arrah and Danapur. Old accounts from the 19th century note that the course of the Ganges in this area has been unsteady. The village of Masarh, for instance, was once situated close to the Ganges, but by the late 1800s, the river had moved nine miles away. A gradual southward shift of the riverbed was observed to have begun around 1860.

The geography of the region around Arrah consists mainly of flat alluvial plains which slope northwards towards the Ganges. This area can be subdivided into two parts: a narrow strip of recent alluvial deposits along the Ganges, and a larger expanse of older alluvium to the south. The soil of the plains of Arrah were historically classified with specific names. Early 19th-century surveys documented the terminology for the primary clay soils that sustained the city: Karel or Kebal for the ash-colored varieties and Gorangth for the yellowish ones. The northern riparian tract was historically subject to regular flooding from the Ganges, often remaining underwater for up to four months during the rainy season. This annual inundation deposited a rich layer of silt, which created exceptionally fertile soil for magnificent cold weather crops. Following the floods, the land would be ploughed and sown with wheat, barley, and pulse, which were known to produce abundant harvests with relatively little effort. Historically, the plains of the city were divided using local lexicons. The lowlands along the Ganges, subject to flooding every year, were called Hetha, while the adjacent uplands above the old river bank were known as Uparar.

The Ganga river acts as northern boundary of the town and due to alluvial deposit the area is very fertile and considered as best wheat growing area of Bihar. The eastern boundary of the town is the Son river which separates and Bhojpuri and Magahi speaking regions of Bihar.

During the British Raj Arrah was the part of Bengal presidency. The land of the city is fertile and most used for cultivation with very low forest cover. The main crops that are grown here are rice, mango and mahuaa.

=== The Son River ===
The Son River outlines the eastern border of the Arrah region. It joins the Ganges about 10 miles north of Maner, at a point roughly midway between Arrah and Danapur. The river is characterised by a intense seasonal transformation. In the Summers, it is often a narrow stream within a vast bed of sand, but during the monsoon, it swells rapidly from its 21,000-square-mile catchment basin, with flood discharges reaching up to 830,000 cubic feet per second, causing short-lived but intense floods in the adjacent plains. The canal system itself was not immune; the Arrah Canal was breached during a flood in July 1876 and again during a severe flood in September 1901, when its banks broke and floodwaters poured into many parts of Arrah, destroying some of the small hamlets on its outskirts.

The riverbed consists almost entirely of sand, which gives the water a reddish, gold-tinged look. This is reflected in its old name, Hiranyabáhu ("golden-armed"), which historians identify with the Erannoboas river mentioned by the Greek historian Megasthenes in the 3rd century BCE. Ancient sources note that the Son's course has gradually shifted westward over centuries; in ancient times, it flowed much further east and joined the Ganges near the ancient city of Pataliputra. Mughal-era texts like the Ain-i-Akbari mention local beliefs that the river had the power to petrify objects and contained sacred shaligram stones.

=== Fauna ===
Colonial-era source describe the region around Arrah as having once been abundant in wildlife, though populations diminished significantly with the expansion of cultivation after the introduction of the canal system. In the plains and the alluvial tract bordering the Ganges, animals such as the nilgai (Boselaphus tragocamelus), black buck, spotted deer, and hog deer (Cervus axis) were found. Animals common throughout the district included the wild pig, jackal, fox, and hare.

The rivers like the Son and Ganges were home to the fish-eating crocodile (gharial) and the mugger crocodile, the latter of which was known to sometimes attack people. The area was also noted for a wide variety of game-birds, with the barred-headed goose, black-backed goose, and grey goose being very common, alongside numerous species of wild duck, teal, partridge, quail, and peafowl.

=== Climate ===
The climate is characterised by relatively high temperatures and evenly distributed precipitation throughout the year. The Köppen Climate Classification sub-type for this climate is "Cwa" (Humid Subtropical Climate).

Climate data for Arrah
Month	Jan	Feb	Mar	Apr	May	Jun	Jul	Aug	Sep	Oct	Nov	Dec	Year
Mean daily maximum °C (°F)	23 (73)	26 (78)	32 (90)	37 (99)	38 (100)	36 (96)	33 (91)	32 (89)	32 (90)	32 (89)	28 (82)	24 (75)	31 (88)
Mean daily minimum °C (°F)	11 (51)	13 (55)	18 (64)	23 (74)	26 (78)	27 (80)	27 (80)	27 (80)	26 (79)	23 (73)	16 (61)	11 (52)	21 (69)
Average precipitation mm (inches)	15 (0.6)	18 (0.7)	10 (0.4)	7.6 (0.3)	36 (1.4)	180 (7.1)	290 (11.6)	330 (13.1)	220 (8.6)	58 (2.3)	7.6 (0.3)	5.1 (0.2)	1,190 (46.7)
Average precipitation days	1.4	1.7	1	0.7	3	10.1	14	15.1	8.1	4	0.8	0.6	60.5
Source: Weatherbase

=== Geology ===
Arrah is situated within the geological landscape of the Bhojpur district, which is primarily characterised by an unconsolidated to semi-consolidated sequence of Quaternary sediments. These sediments unconformably overlie the Pre-Cambrian Vindhyan Supergroup rocks at a depth of approximately 100 to 1200 meters below ground level. While the Vindhyan Supergroup rocks are not exposed on the surface, they have been encountered in borewells in the southern part of the district at a depth of around 150 meters.

Tectonically, the region is located between two sub-surface ridges: the Munger-Saharsa Ridge to the east and the Vindhyan Ridge to the west. The area is intersected by major regional faults, most notably the NE-SW trending West Patna Fault (WPF), which passes through the middle of the area. Movements along these active faults, which accommodate the stress from the Indian Plate's northward movement, have been responsible for major historical earthquakes in the broader region, such as those in 1833, 1934, and 1988.

The main geological formations of the region are:

- Mohanpur Formation (Middle to Upper Pleistocene): Comprises oxidised yellow plastic clay and mottled silty clay with kankar.
- Ramgarh Formation (Holocene): A linear deposit of unconsolidated sandy silt, clayey silt, and sand.
- Durgawati Formation (Holocene): The youngest formation, representing the deposits of the present-day floodplain and river channels, consisting of unconsolidated sandy silt, clay, and pebbly sand.

While the Bhojpur district contains all three types of land, Arrah is situated primarily on the Mohanpur Formation.

== Demographics ==
=== Current demographics ===
As per the 2011 census, Arrah Municipal Corporation had a total population of 261,099, out of which 139,319 were males and 121,780 were females. It had a sex ratio of 874. The population below 5 years was 34,419. The effective literacy rate of the 7+ population was 83.41 per cent. However, the population is not uniformly housed; a 2019 study identified 20 distinct slum pockets within the city, reflecting challenges in urban housing and development.

=== Historical demographics ===
In the early 19th century, the population of the old Shahabad district was estimated at around 1.4 million. Following the first regular census in 1872, the population grew gradually, reaching over 2 million by 1891. This growth was attributed in large part to the development of cultivation and the arrival of immigrants due to the construction of the Son Canals. A significant portion of this migration was concentrated in the Arrah.

However, the census of 1901 recorded a district-wide population decline. This was primarily due to a severe eruption of plague just before the census, which, while not causing extreme mortality, created widespread alarm that caused an migration of temporary settlers and labourers. This effect was reportedly most noticeable in the Arrah. Despite this impermanent decline, the population density around Arrah was the highest in the district, with a recorded density of 890 persons per square mile.

Throughout this period, Arrah was the main urban centre, accounting for approximately two-fifths of the total urban population of the Shahabad district. The district was also a major source of indentured labour for the British colonies; in the decade ending in 1901, the Shahabad district supplied nearly half of all emigrants from the province of Bengal.

Social statistics from the colonial era noted that the Shahabad district had a marked excess of females over males, with a ratio of 1,096 females per 1,000 males. Religiously, the population was predominantly Hindu. The 1901 census recorded a small Christian community of 375 people in the district, mostly of European or Eurasian descent, with a congregation of about 50 local Christians attached to the Lutheran mission in Arrah. The Jain population, numbering 449 at the time, was noted as being "almost entirely confined to the town of Arrah.

==== Historical caste composition ====
According to the 1901 Census of India, the five most numerous Hindu castes in the Shahabad district were the Ahirs, Brahmins, Rajputs, Koeris, and Chamars, who together accounted for nearly half the total population. The Ahirs (or Goálás) were the largest single caste, making up 13% of the district's population. They were noted as being particularly dominant in the Arrah, which was home to nearly 50,000 members of the caste. While their traditional occupation was herding, a large number had taken up agriculture

=== Languages ===
Languages in Arrah (2011 census)
1. Bhojpuri (77.2%)
2. Hindi (12.5%)
3. Urdu (9.96%)
4. Others (0.37%)

Hindi is the official language with Urdu being the additional official. Bhojpuri is the most commonly spoken language, followed by Hindi and Urdu.

== Government and politics ==
=== Administration ===
The Arrah sub-division (Tehsil) is headed by an IAS or state Civil service officer of the rank of Sub Divisional Magistrate (SDM).

==== Blocks ====
The Arrah Tehsil is divided into 8 Blocks, each headed by a Block Development Officer (BDO). List of Blocks is as follows:

1. Arrah
2. Agiaon
3. Barhara
4. Koilwar
5. Udwant Nagar
6. Sandesh
7. Sahar
8. Garhani

=== Civic administration ===
Arrah is the headquarters of the Bhojpur district. On 1 June 1865, the town constituted into a municipality which later became municipal corporation, which currently divides the city in 45 wards. Each ward elects its ward commissioner and, the Mayor is chosen through indirect election in which ward commissioners from respective wards cast their votes.

Ward No.	Population (2011)	Projected Population (2024)	Land area in km^{2}	Pop. density per km^{2} ^{(2024)}	Map of Arrah
1	3950	5590	1.345	4154	Map of wards of Arrah
2	4550	6439	1.5	4274	Map of wards of Arrah
3	5538	7837	0.7	11330	Map of wards of Arrah
4	3373	4773	0.15	31003	Map of wards of Arrah
5	6020	8519	0.83	10186	Map of wards of Arrah
6	4133	5849	0.21	27336	Map of wards of Arrah
7	4368	6181	0.19	31652	Map of wards of Arrah
8	4560	6453	0.07	88452	Map of wards of Arrah
9	4,653	6,627	0.06	94,941	Map of wards of Arrah
10	4,405	6,623	0.14	43399	Map of wards of Arrah
11	7477	10581	2.28	4631	Map of wards of Arrah
12	4,400	6,226	0.39	16,061	Map of wards of Arrah
13	4,646	6,574	1.23	5319	Map of wards of Arrah
14	10,420	14,745	0.28	52,134	Map of wards of Arrah
15	8,438	11,940	0.58	20,532	Map of wards of Arrah
16	2,951	4,176	0.57	7,278	Map of wards of Arrah
17	6,113	8,659	0.42	20,406	Map of wards of Arrah
18	3,015	4,266	0.28	14,931	Map of wards of Arrah
19	4,533	6,415	0.38	16,785	Map of wards of Arrah
20	5,134	7,265	0.18	39,894	Map of wards of Arrah
21	3,559	5,036	0.12	40,947	Map of wards of Arrah
22	5,476	7,749	0.14	53,711	Map of wards of Arrah
23	4,170	5,901	0.13	44,872	Map of wards of Arrah
24	7,277	10,298	0.18	57,233	Map of wards of Arrah
25	6,825	9,658	0.11	85,001	
26	6,987	9,887	0.1	99,654	
27	7,439	10,527	0.15	71,533	
28	3,320	4,698	0.16	28,798	
29	4,528	6,407	0.35	18,019	
30	4,610	6,524	0.3	22,036	
31	5,878	8,318	0.31	26,420	
32	5,988	8,473	0.98	8,677	
33	8,633	12,259	0.28	43,453	
34	7,232	10,342	1.01	10,046	
35	6,249	8,843	1.95	4516	
36	6,634	9,388	2.18	4,301	
37	7,544	10,675	0.28	37,525	
38	8,534	12,076	0.2	58,738	
39	5,371	7,600	0.16	45,989	
40	4,544	6,430	0.25	25,691	
41	4,024	5,694	0.25	22,904	
42	11,333	16,047	1.06	15,043	
43	8,377	11,854	0.55	21,464	
44	6,819	9,649	0.85	11,239	
45	7,342	10,390	5.81	1786	

=== Modern challenges ===
==== Solid waste management ====
Solid waste management is a major challenge for the city. A 2025 study by researchers at Veer Kunwar Singh University noted that with a projected 2024 population of 369,944, Arrah generates approximately 110 tons of solid waste daily. The average per capita generation is 0.450 kg per day. The composition of this waste is sourced from residential areas (50%), street sweeping and drains (30%), commercial establishments (15%), and institutions (5%).

According to the study, the Ara Municipal Corporation, which handles waste management with 1212 employees, faces significant challenges. Of the 110 tons generated daily, only 2 tons are processed through composting. The remaining 108 tons are disposed of without treatment, a situation exacerbated by the lack of a scientific landfill site in the city. The research highlights that waste generation varies spatially across the city's 45 wards, with higher population density directly correlating with higher waste production.

==== Groundwater contamination ====
These Quaternary sediments make the region part of the vast Ganga Basin, which holds nearly 40% of India's replenishable groundwater. However, these same geological conditions present significant environmental challenges. A major concern is the geogenic contamination of groundwater, particularly with elevated levels of arsenic (As). Bhojpur district, for which Arrah is the headquarters, is one of the worst-affected areas in Bihar. A 2003 study recorded an alarming arsenic level of 1654 μg/L in the groundwater of Semaria Ojhapatti village. This is critically high compared to the World Health Organisation's safe limit of 10 μg/L and the Indian government's permissible limit of 50 μg/L, posing a severe health risk to the population that relies on groundwater for drinking.

=== Sand mining and environmental impact ===
While mining of Sand is a district-wide activity, its environmental and regulatory aspects are relevant to Arrah as the administrative headquarters. The increasing demand for sand due to rapid urbanisation has led to extensive mining in the district, which has notable environmental impacts. Unsustainable extraction can lead to the erosion of river banks and alter the river's geometry and bed elevation.

To mitigate these impacts, mining in the district is regulated by the Sustainable Sand Mining Guidelines, 2016 and the Enforcement & Monitoring Guidelines for Sand Mining (EMGSM) January 2020. These guidelines stipulate:

- A mining depth restricted to 3 metres or the water level, whichever is less.
- Prohibitions on diverting streams for mining.
- Measures to control noise and air pollution.
- Requirements for the reclamation of mined-out areas and restoration of affected flora.
- The implementation of risk assessment and disaster management plans for mining operations.

== Economy ==
The economy of Arrah is closely tied to the broader economic activities of the Bhojpur district, for which it serves as the main administrative and commercial center. The city's economy has a low degree of industrialisation, with industries covering just 0.51% of its land area. While agriculture has been historically significant, the regional economy has seen a major influence from the mineral sector in recent years. The alluvial deposits of Ganga river is considered suitable for brick making, the city mainly produces the revenue through building materials like sand and bricks.

Historically, the region's economy has been defined by its agriculture, which was significantly transformed by the Sone Canal System in the late 19th century. The Arrah Canal, a major component of this system, was designed to irrigate nearly 150,000 acres in the old Shahabad district. A 1875 report stated that the canal system was expected to provide the district with "an entire immunity from future famines".

Across the Bhojpur district, sand mining from the Son and Ganga rivers is a major economic driver. Although the mining ghats (sites) are located along the rivers, the industry's administration, logistics, and economic benefits are centered in Arrah. The sand extracted in the district is a key component in concrete and is used extensively in construction. Industrial sand from the region is also used to make glass, as foundry sand, and as an abrasive.

=== District mineral production and revenue ===
The production of sand for the entire Bhojpur district from 2015 to 2019 was as follows:

- 2015: 160,633,523 cft
- 2016: 60,211,630 cft
- 2017: 58,707,174 cft
- 2018: 244,904,600 cft
- 2019: 281,811,800 cft

Consequently, the revenue generated from the mineral sector for the Bhojpur district saw a significant increase:

- 2015-2016: ₹9625.6 lakhs
- 2016-2017: ₹9270.6 lakhs
- 2017-2018: ₹7966.61 lakhs
- 2018-2019: ₹17353.15 lakhs
- 2019-2020: ₹19623.42 lakhs

== Culture ==
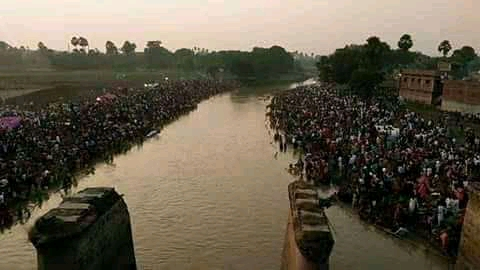
Chhath Celebration at Gangi River

Arrah's native language is Bhojpuri. Bhojpuri cuisine includes Litti-Chokha, Makuni (Paratha stuffed with roasted gram flour), Dal Pitthi, Pittha, Aaloo Dum, Jaaur (Kheer). The main snack and sweets are Khurma (sweets made of Chhena), Thekua, Pudukiya, Patal ke Mithai, Anarsa, Gargatta and Laktho. Some of the drinks are Satuā, Amjhor, Taadi and Māthā.

== Cityscape ==
=== Urban structure and land use ===
Arrah's urban structure is its significant semi-agrarian landscape. Within the city's 3,136-hectare boundary, nearly half of the land (49.01%) is used for agriculture, a stark contrast to the area dedicated to urban functions. Residential zones comprise just 9.47% of the total area, concentrated in compact zones, while the primary commercial hub is centered around Ara Chowk. Industrial use is minimal at 0.51%, with other uses like administrative, educational, and recreational facilities occupying smaller portions of the landscape.

=== Notable sites ===
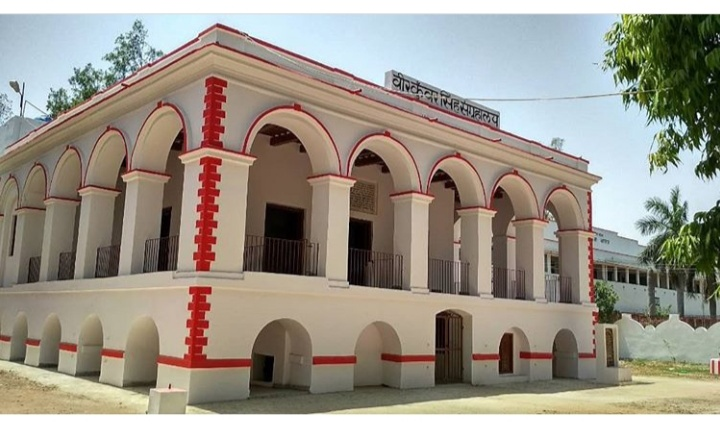
Arrah House

Arrah is a holy place for Jains and there are 44 Jain temples in the city. There is a centuries-old Jain temple of Parashanatha in the Masarh village. One such temple is located at Dhanupra on the Arrah-Koilwar road, which was built in 1815. Some notable places of Arrah are:

==== Aranya Devi Temple ====
This is a temple of Aranya Devi (Forest Goddess). She is said to be the deity goddess of Ara town. Here one statue is of Adi Shakti and the second is established by the Pandavas. The temple is very old and draws many devotees every day. It is situated at the top of stone boulders.

==== Maulabagh Mosque ====
This mosque was built in 1814 under the auspices of John Deane, a member of the East India Company's service. The structure is described as being of a mixed Saracenic style with three domes and eight minarets, and is maintained by an endowment fund. He had a Mohammedan wife with whom he lived 20 years with 6 children. After his death in 1817, he was buried in the outer garden of Maulabagh Mosque (called as Bibi Jaan ke Hata or Handa) where his tomb can still be seen. This mosques is also mentioned by British officers in their writings.

=== Jama Masjid ===
The city's Jama Masjid is a Saracenic building featuring four minarets. Historical accounts state that it is said to have been constructed during the time of the Mughal emperor Aurangzeb.

==== Koilwar Bridge ====
Koilwar Bridge, also known as Abdul Bari Bridge, is a 1.44 km long, 2-lane wide rail-cum-road bridge built in 1862 over Son River connecting the city of Arrah to Patna.

==== Ramna Maidan ====
Ramna Maidan is a park with 60 acres of land, one of the largest urban parks in Arrah.

==== Arrah–Chhapra Bridge ====
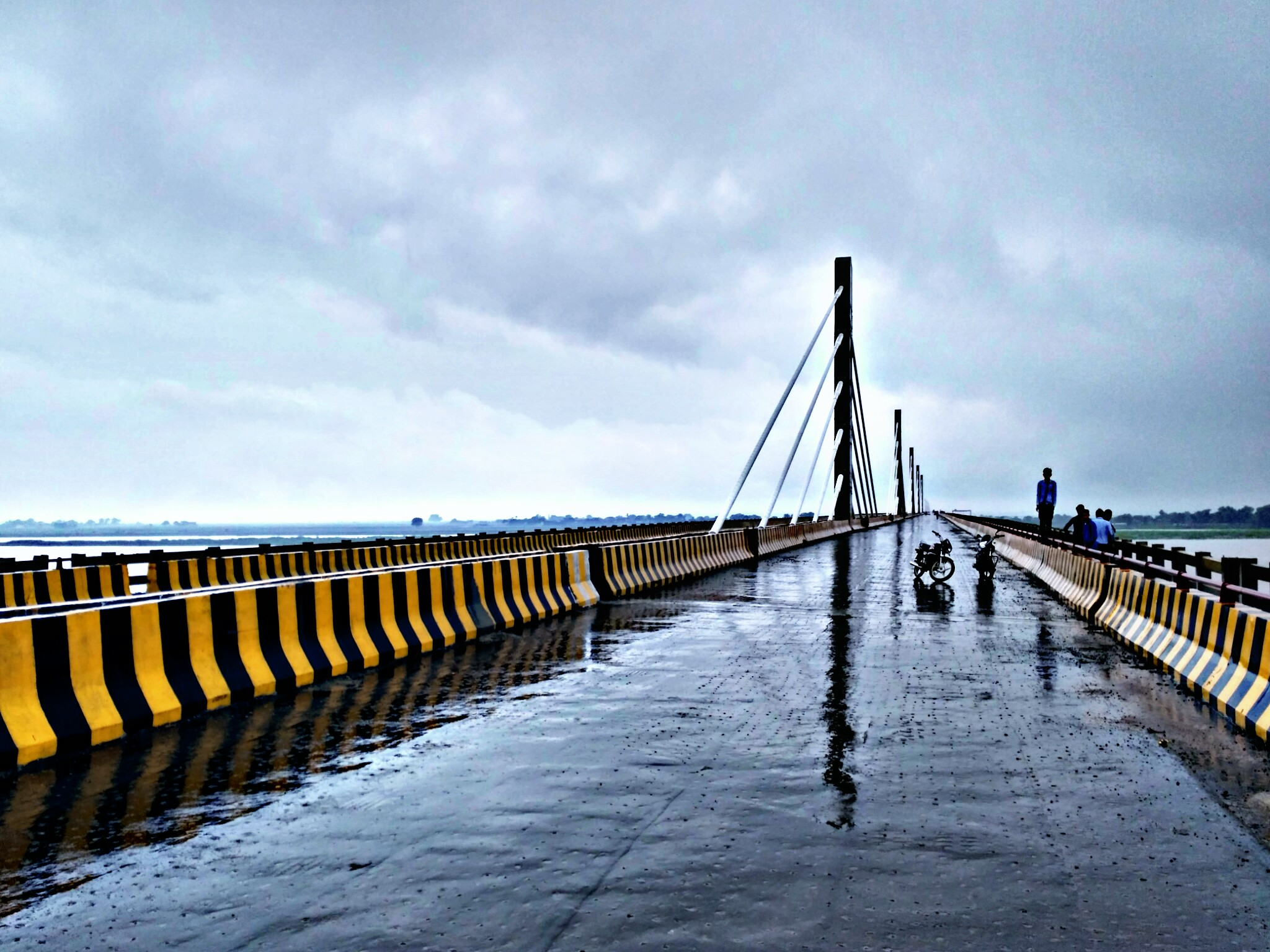
Arrah–Chhapra Bridge

Arrah–Chhapra Bridge, also known as Veer Kunwar singh Setu, connects Arrah and Chhapra. It is the world's longest multi span extradosed bridge in the world with a length of 1920m.

==== Masarh ====
Masarh is a village 10 km from Arrah. Lion capitals of Mauryan period have been found here. Masarh has been identified with Mo-ho-so-lo of the Chinese pilgrim Huen Tsang.

==== Arrah House ====
Arrah House is a small British building in the premises of Maharaja College.

==== Holy Saviour Church ====
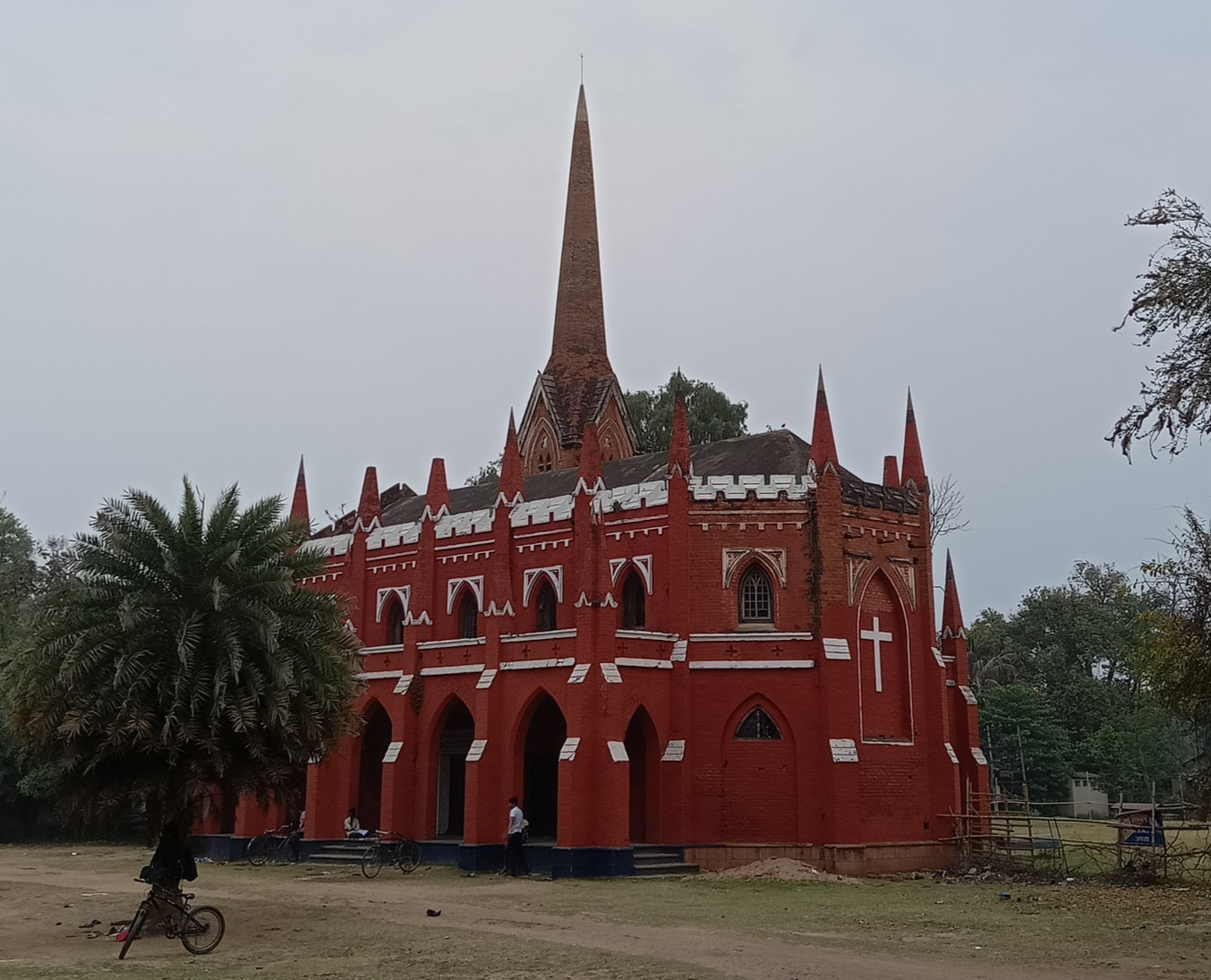
Holy Saviour Church

Holy Saviour Church is a church in Arrah, built by the British in 1911, when King of United Kingdom George V visited the city.

== Transport ==
The Arrah city is connected by roads, highways and rail routes to various cities like Patna, Danapur, Bihta, Buxar, Sasaram and Chhapra in Bihar; and Ghazipur, Mughalsarai and Varanasi in Uttar Pradesh. According to a 2023 report by National Bureau of Economic Research, Arrah was among the world's top 10 cities with slowest traffic.

=== Roads ===
- Patna-Arrah-Buxar (NH-922)
- Arrah-Dinara-Mohania (NH-319)
- Arrah-Chhapra Bridge
- Arrah-Bikramganj-Sasaram (SH-12)

=== Railway ===
- Arrah Junction: ARA (0 km)
- Koilwar railway station: KWR (14 km)
- Udwantnagar railway station: UWNR (5 km)
- Bihiya railway station: BEA (21 km)

=== Airway ===
- Patna Airport (50 km)
- Bihta Airport (30 km)

=== Bullet train ===
The Varanasi-Howrah high-speed rail corridor (HSR) is proposed to pass through Bhojpur district with a Bullet train station at Udwant Nagar. It will cross the Sone River near Jalpura Tapa and enter Patna district.

=== Historical river and canal navigation ===
While the Arrah Canal was engineered for navigation, transport on the Son River itself was historically limited and challenging. Commercial navigation in the lower reaches near Arrah was irregular due to unsafe rapids upstream and the "extraordinary violence of the floods" during the rainy season. Although ferry boats operated for much of the year, the principal traffic on the Son was not cargo vessels but large rafts of bamboo and timber floated downstream from the southern forests.

The Arrah Canal provided a more reliable route. Contemporary sources described many canal boats loaded with grain or stone using the canal system to travel towards the Ganges, destined for Calcutta. These boats were typically 15 to 25 feet long and were propelled by teams of men pulling them along towpaths.

== Education ==
Schools in Arrah are either government-run or private schools. Schools are affiliated by Central Board of Secondary Education and Bihar School Examination Board. Veer Kunwar Singh University is located here. Harprasad Das Jain College, Maharaja Collage, and Jagjiwan College are some of the premier institutions for higher education. Jain Siddhant Bhawan is a Jain Library in Arrah which is illustrious for collecting centuries older manuscripts in various languages.

In 2018, Bihar government has opened Government Engineering Colleges in each district of Bihar under the Department of Science and Technology. Government Engineering College, Bhojpur located south of Ramna Road, beside Maharaja College.

== Sports ==
Cricket is the most popular sport, however other sports such as volleyball, basketball, and athletics are also played.

Veer Kunwar Singh Stadium is the stadium situated in the Ramna Maidan which hosts various cricket, football, and hockey tournaments. Other grounds in the town are Ramna Maidan, Maharaja college ground, Airport Ground, and Jain College Ground.

From 5–7 December 2019, East Zone Inter University Kabaddi championship took place in the premises of Maharaja College in which 47 universities of 12 different states participated.

== Popular culture ==
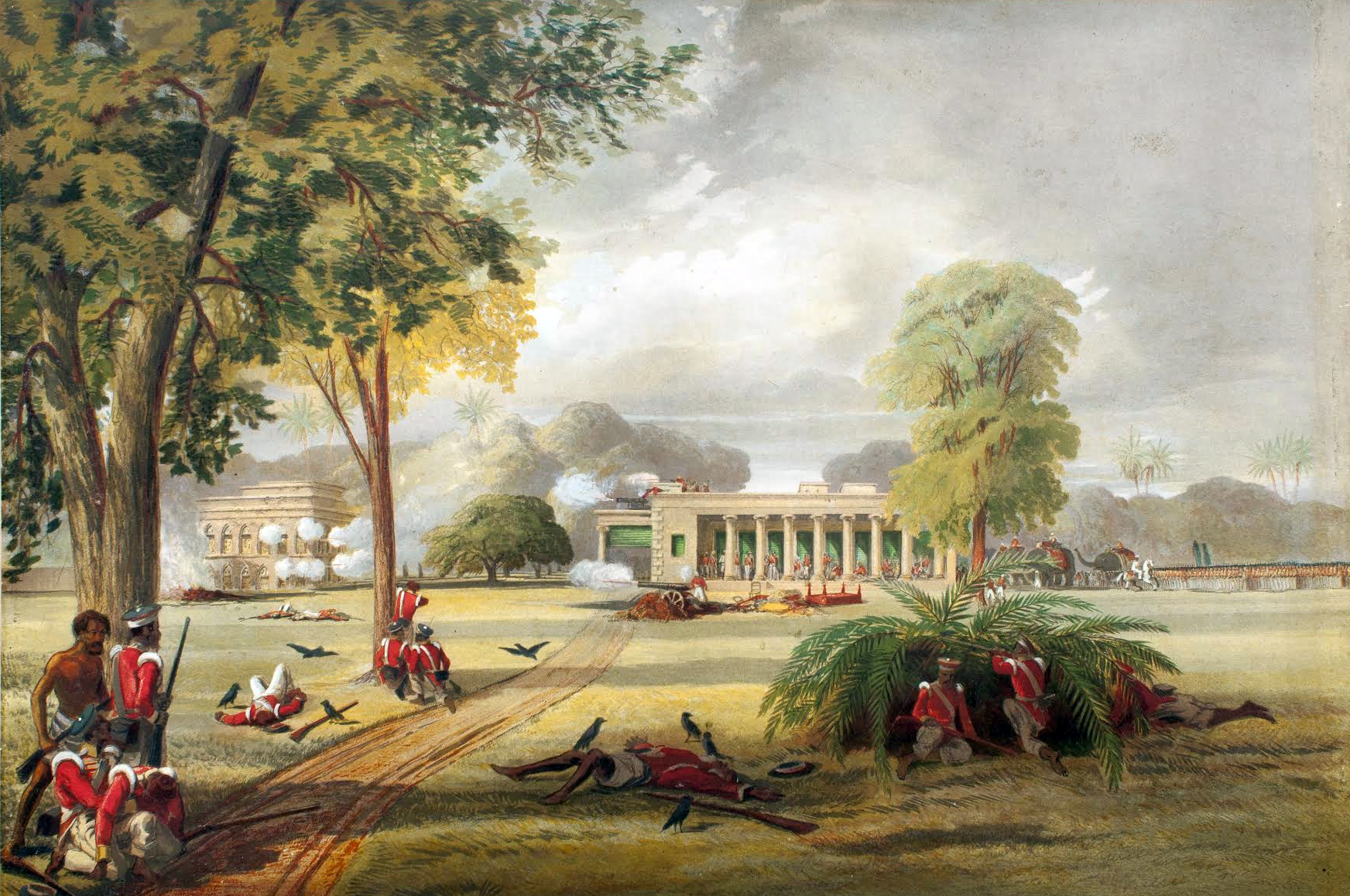
Defence of the Arrah House, 1857 (1858) by William Tayler.

=== In music ===
- There is a very famous Bhojpuri saying about this place, Ara jilā Ghar Ba ta, kawana bāt kē dar bā" (trans. If you belong to Arrah, there is nothing to fear).
- Arrah also has mentions in many Bhojpuri Folk songs like Arrah Hile Chhapra Hile Baliya Hilela.
- The famous bhojpuri song "Tu lagawelu jab Lipistic, hilela Arrah district" sung by Pawan Singh.

=== Films and songs ===
- Some shots of the feature film Gandhi were shot in Arrah near the Koilwar bridge.
- Shots of the first Bhojpuri film Ganga Maiyya Tohe Piyari Chadhaibo were shot at Arrah railway station.
- The story of the Bollywood film Anaarkali of Aarah was based on a dancer of Arrah and her confrontation with the Vice-chancellor of Bir Kuber University (originally Veer Kunwar Singh University).

=== Books ===
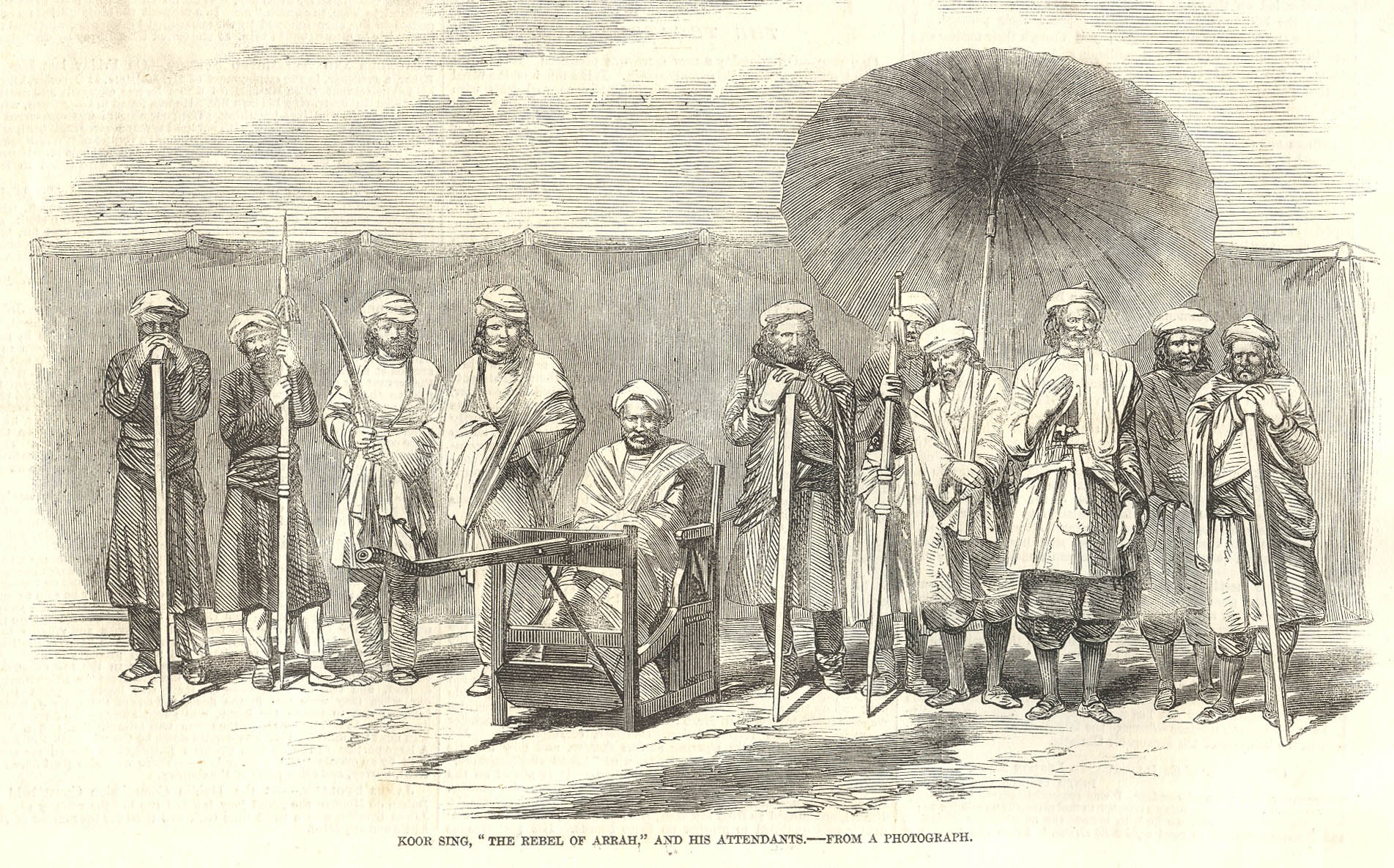
Koor Sing, "The Rebel of Arrah", and his attendants – From a photograph, from the Illustrated London News (1857)

- English book Two Months In Arrah, written in 1857, by a surgeon in British army named J.J. Halls, is an account of the Siege of Arrah.

== See also ==
- Arrah House
- Arrah Lok Sabha constituency

== Bibliography ==
- District Survey Report for Sand Minerals of Bhojpur District, Bihar (Report). Government of Bihar. February 2022.
- Sahu, Sudarsan (1 June 2013). Hydrogeological conditions and geogenic pollution in parts of western Bihar (PhD thesis). BANARAS HINDU UNIVERSITY.
