= Harprasad Das Jain College =

Degree College in Bihar

- Veer Kunwar Singh University
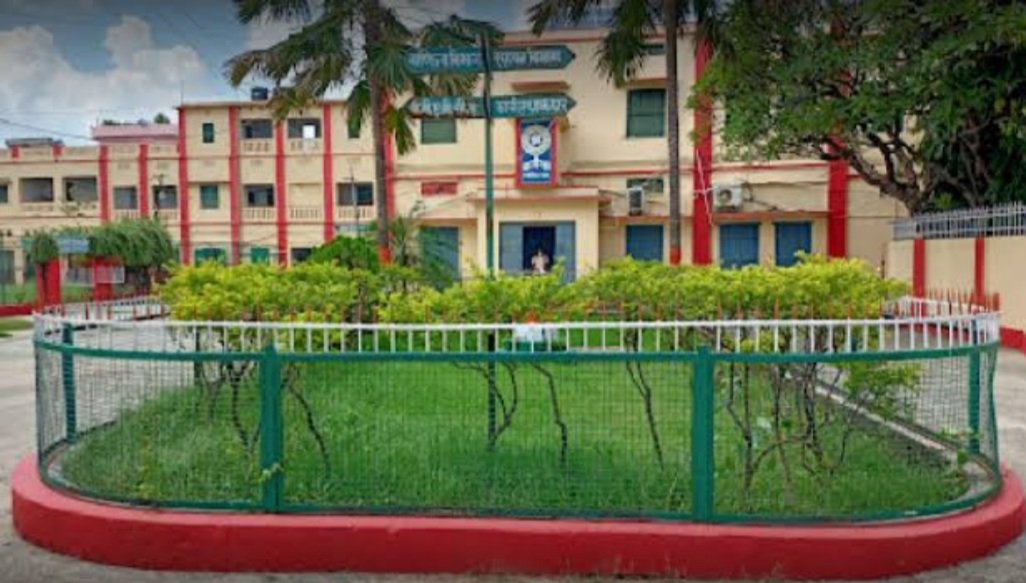
- H. D. Jain College
- Location: Near Ara Junction
- Full name: Harprasad Das Jain College
- Abbreviation: Jain College
- Motto in English: By knowledge one finds Immortality
- Established: 1942 (84 years ago)
- Named for: Har Prasad Das Jain
- Principal: Dr. Shailendra Ojha
- Website: www.hdjaincollege.org
- Students' union: hdjaincollege.org/pmessage.htm

Harprasad Das Jain College or Jain College or H.D. Jain College is a constituent college of Veer Kunwar Singh University situated in Arrah town of Bihar. It was founded in 1942 and was the first institution of higher learning set up in Western Bihar.

== History ==
Established in 1942, it is one of the oldest colleges of Bihar. It was founded by Adi Nath Trust which was formed by Har Prasad Das Jain. Earlier it was affiliated to Patna University but now it is affiliated colleges of Veer Kunwar Singh University.

== Campus ==
The cricket ground is one of the best grounds of the town and is used by Jain College Team for practice and organising other Cricket tournaments and matches. The ground is also used for football, Hockey and Athletics.

== Notable faculty ==
- Dinesh Nandan Sahay
