= Shankarpali =

Indian and Pakistani sweet snack

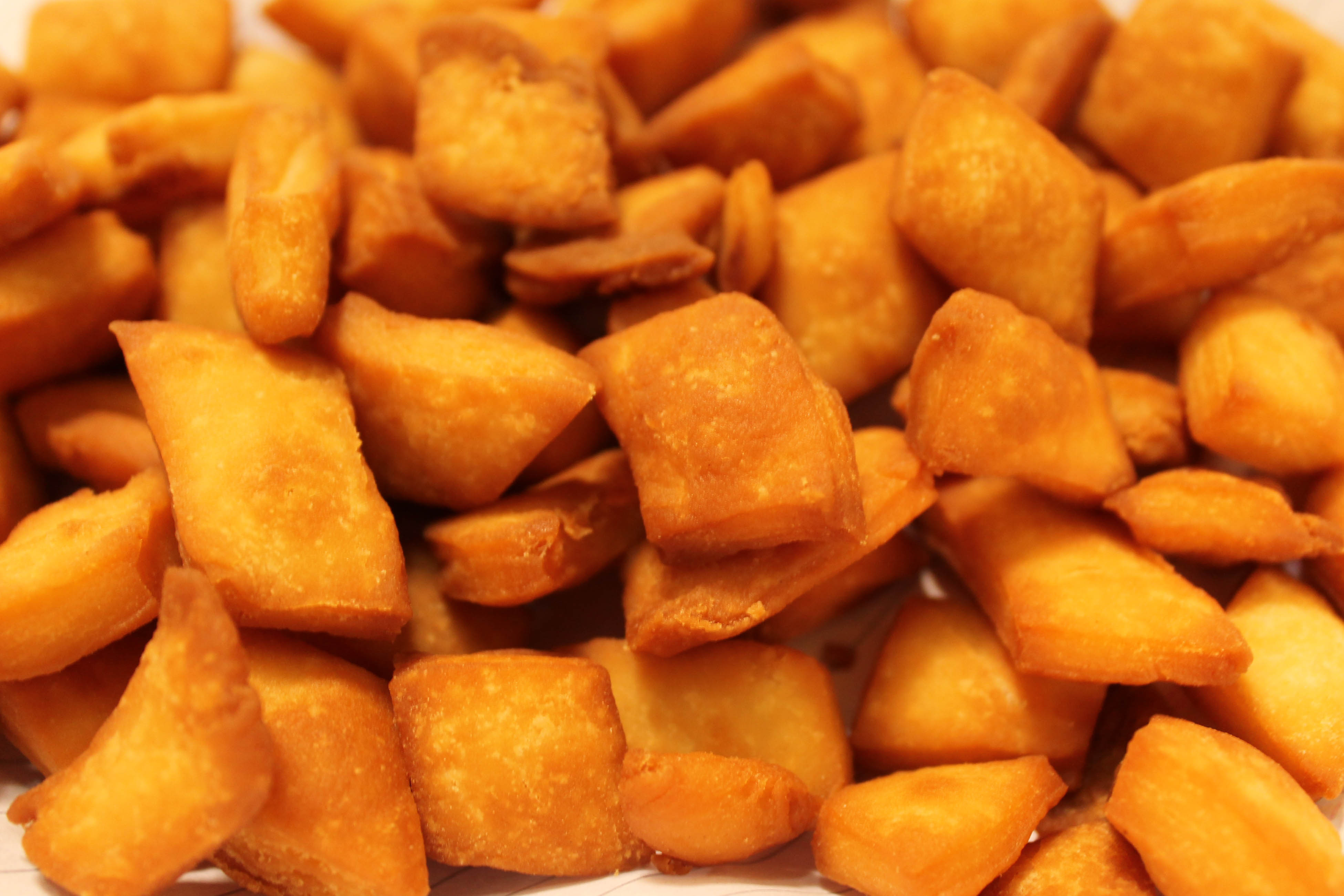
- Alternative names: Shakkarpara, Khurma, Kurma, Laktho, Murali, Lakdi Mithai
- Course: Snack
- Place of origin: India, Pakistan
- Region or state: Maharashtra
- Associated cuisine: Indian, Pakistani
- Main ingredients: Milk, sugar, ghee (or butter), maida, semolina
- Variations: Khurma

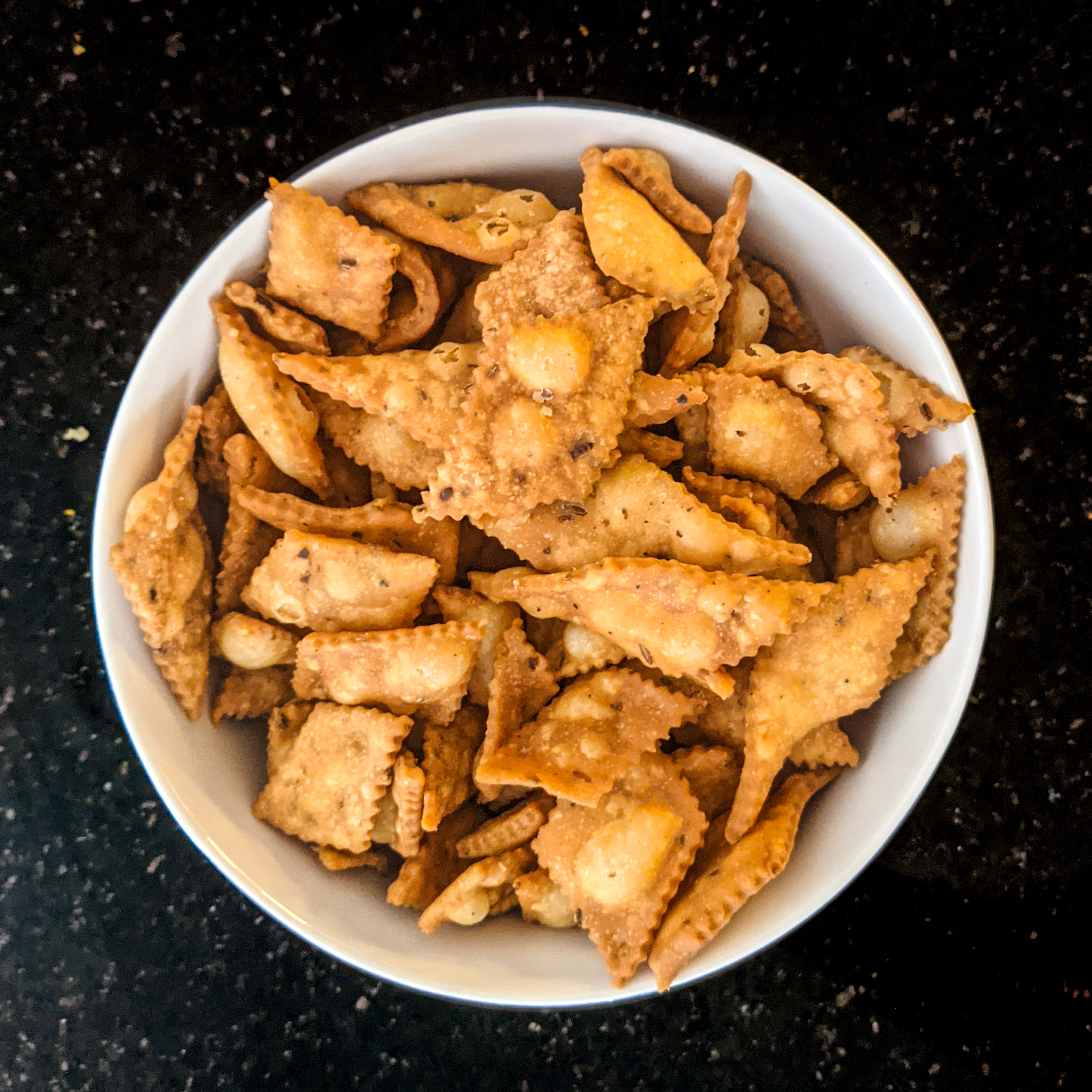
Savory shankarpali in a bowl

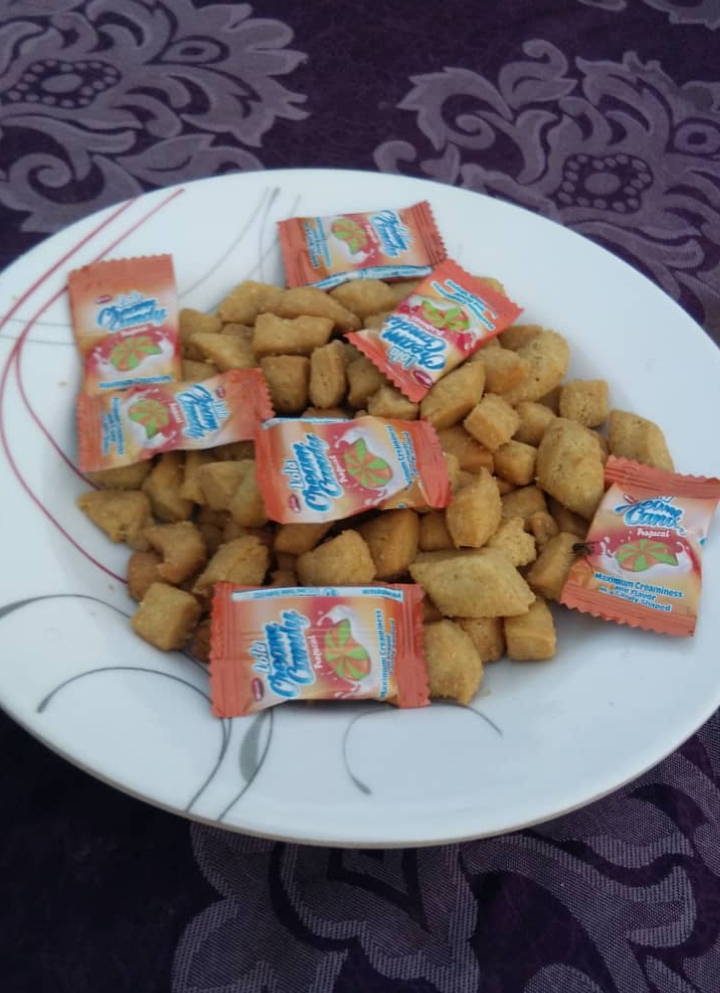
Home made chin-chin

Shankarpali, Shakkarpara, murali, khurma, kurma, laktho, lakdi mithai, or just simply mithai is an Indian and Pakistani sweet snack made from a dough of sugar, ghee (or butter), maida flour, and semolina. Although the dish originates out of the Marathi cuisine of Maharashtra, the name is derived from the Persian word, Shekarpareh. Shankarpali is eaten all over India, especially in Uttar Pradesh.

Shankarpali's variant known as khurma or laktho is also eaten in Bihar, Jharkhand, and eastern Uttar Pradesh. It is also eaten by the Indian diaspora in Fiji, Guyana, Mauritius, Suriname, Trinidad and Tobago, the United States, Canada, the United Kingdom, Australia and New Zealand. It is traditionally eaten on Diwali and can be sweet, sour or spicy depending upon how it is made.

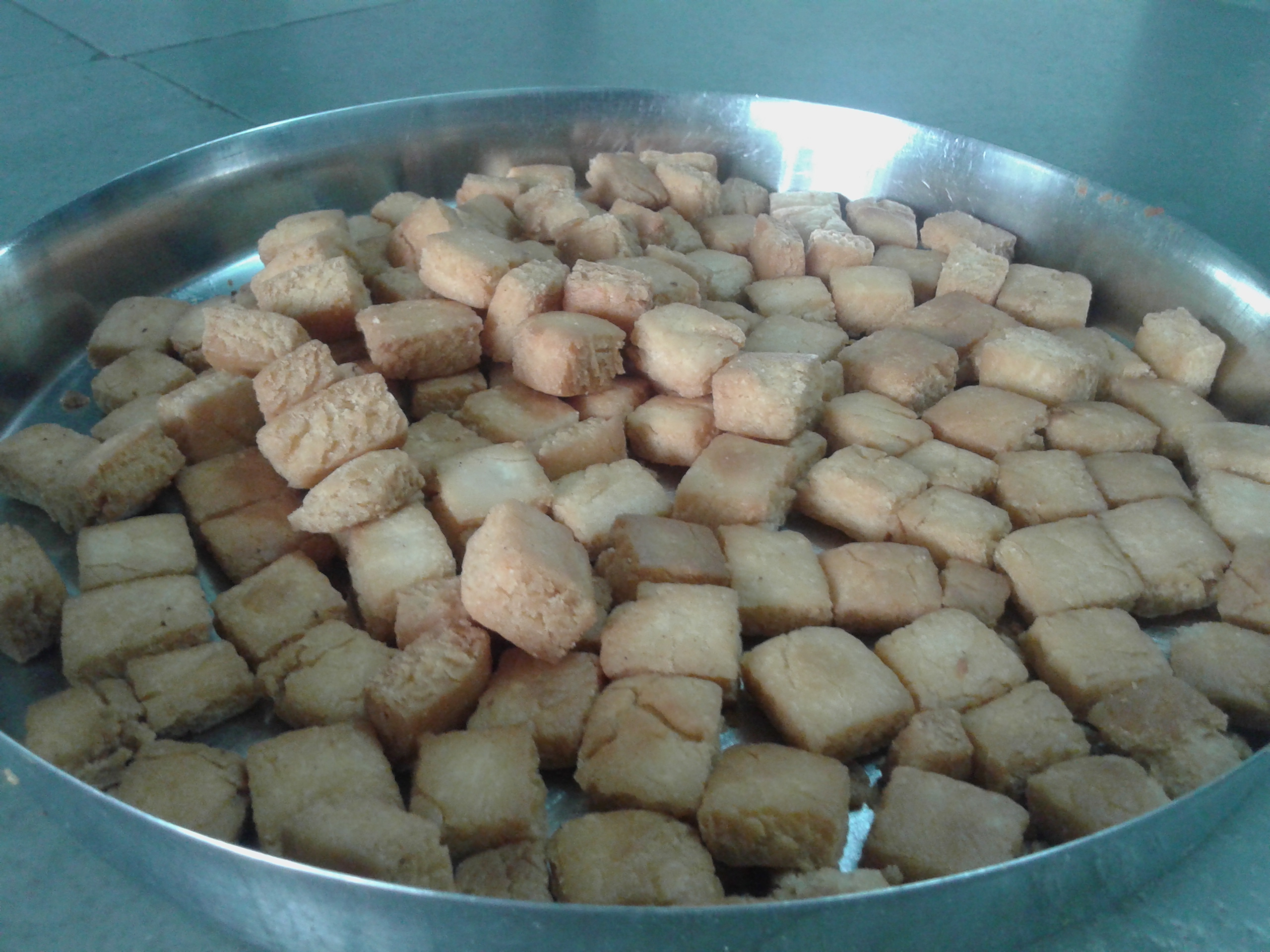

It is a popular snack amongst the Maharashtrian, Gujarati and Kannadiga communities in India and has a long shelf-life. It is widely available in shops. People usually purchase ready-made shankarpali during the year and only prepare it at home during Diwali. This provides a livelihood for women who produce it throughout the year and market it.

== Names ==
- Gujarati: shakkarpara (શક્કરપારા)
- Marathi: shankarpali (शंकरपाळी)
- Kannada: shankarapali/shankarapoli (ಶಂಕರಪಾಳಿ/ಶಂಕರಪೋಳಿ)
- Bengali: nimki (নিমকি)
- Punjabi: shakkarpara (ਸ਼ੱਕਰਪਾਰਾ/شکر پارا)
- Hindi-Urdu: shakarpare/khurma (शुक्र पारे/شکر پارے)/(खुरमा/خرمہ)
- Nepali: khurma (खुर्मा)
- Bhojpuri, Awadhi, Maithili, and Magahi: khurma (खुरमा)
- Fiji Hindi: lakdi mithai (लकड़ी मिठाई)
- Guyanese Hindustani: mithai (मिठाई/مٹھائی)
- Trinidadian Hindustani: khurma (खुरमा/خرمہ)

== See also ==
- Koswad
- Sanna
- List of Indian snacks
