= Masarh =

Historic village in Bihar

- Village
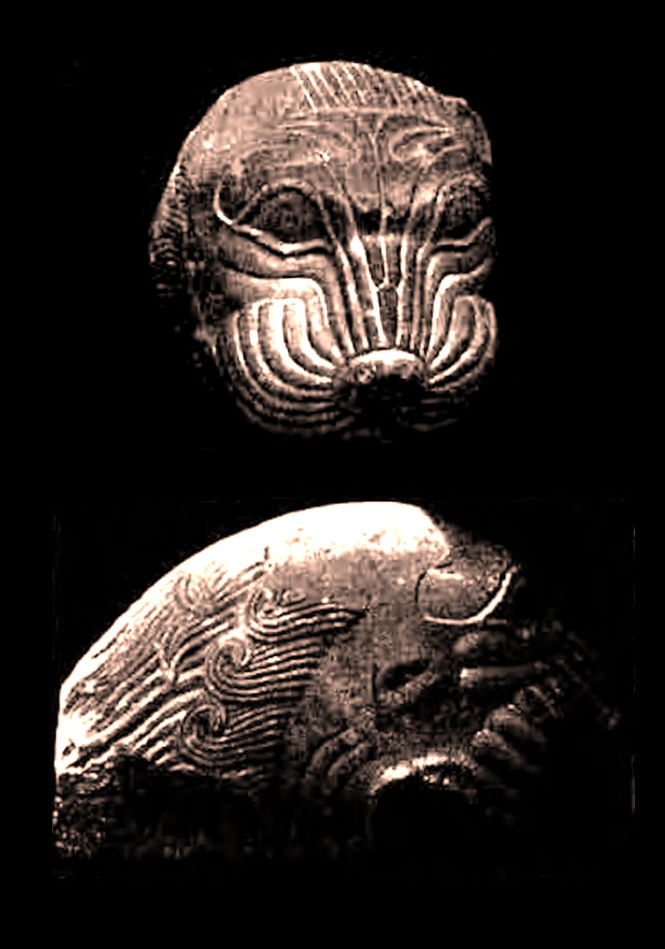
- Masarh lion sculpture, c. 3rd century BCE
- Interactive map of Masarh
- Country: India
- State: Bihar
- District: Bhojpur
- Block: Udwant Nagar

Population (2011)
  - Total: 8,102
- Time zone: UTC+5:30 (IST)
- Climate: Cwa

Masarh, also spelled Masar or Masadh (Hindi: मसाढ़), is a village in the Bhojpur district of Bihar, situated approximately 6 miles (10 km) west of Arrah. It is an archaeological site identified by historians with Mo-ho-so-lo, a place visited by the 7th-century Chinese pilgrim Xuanzang. The village contains significant historical ruins and artifacts related to both Jainism and Hinduism.

== Etymology ==
The name Masarh is believed to be derived from Mahā-sāra. This identification is supported by seven inscriptions, nearly 500 years old, found in the village's Jain temple of Parshvanatha.

An inscription found at Masarh also contains the name Aramnagar (meaning "city of repose" or "monastery city"). While General Cunningham theorized this name was given by Buddhists to the town of Arrah, its presence in an inscription at Masarh is notable. The local tradition that the village was once named Padmavatipura is also maintained.

== History ==
=== Xuanzang's Account ===
The earliest definitive account of Masarh comes from the Chinese pilgrim Xuanzang, who visited the area in the 7th century A.D. He referred to it as Mo-ho-so-lo, his first recorded stop in the historical Shahabad region. He described it as being inhabited entirely by Brahmans who held no respect for Buddhism. His account also noted that the village was situated close to the banks of the Ganges.

=== Jain Settlement ===
Inscriptions show that Masarh became a significant Jain center in the late 14th century. The inscriptions found on eight Jain images in the local temple. Seven of these inscriptions carry the date Samvat 1443 (i.e. 1386 A.D.), while the 8th is dated Samvat 1449 (i.e. 1392 A.D.). These dates are believed to mark the approximate construction period of an older Jain temple on the site, which local tradition attributes to a merchant named Hari Mal. The inscriptions also record the settlement of Rahtor Jains from Marwar in the area.

=== Local Tradition ===
Local tradition connects the village with the ancient Sonitpur, the place of the demon Banasura, whose daughter Ukha was married to Aniruddha, the grandson of Krishna. An 1812 account by Francis Buchanan-Hamilton, confirms that villagers used to refer to the largest ruin as the house of Ban Asur. This source also adds another layer to the tradition, mentioning that villagers believed the Cheros, occupied the site long after Banasura's era. He theorized that the architectural style of the works at Masarh pointed to the Cheros as the builders.

He further noted the chronological discrepancy in the legends. While Banasura is placed in the Dwaparyug (c. 1100-1000 BCE), centuries before the Cheros, He hypothesized that if the legend of Banasura being defeated by the Yavanas (Indo-Greeks) was true, it would make him a contemporary of the Cheros. This historical analysis provides a potential link between the mythological figure and a known ruling dynasty of the region.

== Archeological findings ==
Masarh has yielded a large number of Brahmanical and Jain statues and the foundations of ancient temples.

=== Jain Temple of Parshvanatha ===
A Jain temple attributed to Parshvanatha, which was completed in 1819 A.D, stands on the site of an older one. Francis Buchanan-Hamilton's account in 1812 describes this temple during its construction, mentioning that at the time, only the foundations and one small chamber had been built. This chamber housed eight small, rudely carved Jain images which, according to the inscriptions, dated to 1386 and 1392 A.D.

Buchanan-Hamilton made a nobservation that many stone slabs at the Masarh site were carved with figures on both sides, a feature he had not seen elsewhere. He also noted that during the digging for the new temple's foundations, many older carved fragments were unearthed and placed under a nearby tree. A modern inscription from 1819 mentions that one of the images of Parshvanatha was dedicated by Babu Sankar Lal of Aramnagar.

=== Other Ruins and Sculptures ===
Buchanan's report also documented other significant details of the site. He noted the presence of two old tanks, one to the south and another to the east of the main ruin mound known as Ban Asur's house.

Along the southern bank of the eastern tank, he described another long heap of ruins. According to locals, this area had been continuously occupied by small temples built and rebuilt by various sects over time. At the eastern end of this heap, He observed a specific Lingga with the head and neck of a female carved on its side, a form known as Gauri Shankar. He also described an octagonal column projecting from the north end of the main mound, the end of which had been cut to look like a phallus and was worshipped as such by locals. He mentions seeing several other Linggas around the village and was told that many more images, taken from the ruins, were kept inside houses.

Among the many carved fragments found at the site, several principal figures, including two statues are similar in style to the main Ban Asur image, a figure of Ganesha, a goddess seated on a lion with a child on her knee, and a representation of Krishna and Radha.

The 1812 report, concluded that the main mound, the house of Ban Asur, was evidently a large monastery, likely a structure similar in form to Buddhist stupas. The report hypothesized that the ruins near the tank and other smaller surrounding buildings were most likely accommodations for the temple's priests or monks.

==== The 'Banasura' Statue ====
A statue of Banasur standing 9.5 feet high was found. This statue was popularly called the image of the demon king Banasura, linking to the local story that Masarh was the ancient Sonitpur. Buchanan-Hamilton noticed the image at Masarh in the early 19th century. His report from 1812 gives a description of its iconography, noting that the figure's diadem (headdress) was sometimes depicted with a Lingga (a symbol of Shiva, whom Banasura famously worshipped) and in other instances with a Buddha. Thissuggests the place may have had overlapping Shaivite and Buddhist influences. The statue was later moved in 1882 to the garden of the Maharani of Dumraon.

==== Masarh Lion ====
The village is also the find-spot of the Masarh lion, a notable pillar capital from the Mauryan period.

== Geography ==
The geography of Masarh has been significantly impacted by the shifting route of the Ganges. While 7th-century accounts place the village on the river's banks, the Ganges now flows approximately 9 miles to the north. The high bank of the river's old bed is still traceable in the landscape, passing near Arrah and other local towns. Historical records note that a gradual southward movement of the riverbed began around 1860.

== See also ==
- Masarh lion
- Parashanatha Temple, Arrah
