= Khurma (sweet) =

Indian Milk Sweet

Khurma, also known as laktho, lakdi mithai, or just simply mithai, is an Indian sweet milk dish that originated in the towns of Udwantnagar and Arrah in the Bhojpur district of Bihar in Eastern India. It is considered similar to Shankarpali. It is a common dish in Bhojpuri cuisine of the Bhojpur region. It is also in Bihar, Jharkhand, and eastern Uttar Pradesh. It is also eaten by the Indian diaspora in Fiji, Guyana, Mauritius, Suriname, Trinidad and Tobago, the United States, Canada, the United Kingdom, Australia and New Zealand. It is traditionally eaten on Diwali and Holi (Phagwah). It is related to Shankarpali.

== Names ==
- Hindi-Urdu: shakarpare/khurma (शुक्र पारे/شکر پارے)/(खुरमा/خرمہ)
- Nepali: khurma (खुर्मा)
- Bhojpuri, Awadhi, Maithili, Magahi, Bagheli, Angika, Nagpuri, Kurmali, Tharu, and Khortha: khurma (खुरमा)
- Fiji Hindi: lakdi mithai (लकड़ी मिठाई)
- Guyanese Hindustani: mithai (मिठाई/مٹھائی)
- Trinidadian Hindustani: khurma (खुरमा/خرمہ)
