= Veer Kunwar Singh Stadium =

Stadium in Bihar, India

- Ramna Stadium
- Interactive map of Veer Kunwar Singh Stadium
- Full name: Veer Kunwar Singh Stadium
- Location: Arrah, Bihar, India
- Coordinates: 25.5614°N 84.6643°E
- Owner: Government of Bihar
- Capacity: 10,000
- Surface: Green

Veer Kunwar Singh Stadium is a multi-purpose stadium located in Arrah, Bihar. The stadium has capacity of 10,000 spectators. The stadium is a venue for football tournaments, fairs & exhibition. It is used mostly for association football matches and the stadium is named after the Indian leader Babu Veer Kunwar Singh.
