= Two Months In Arrah =

Book written on siege of Arrah

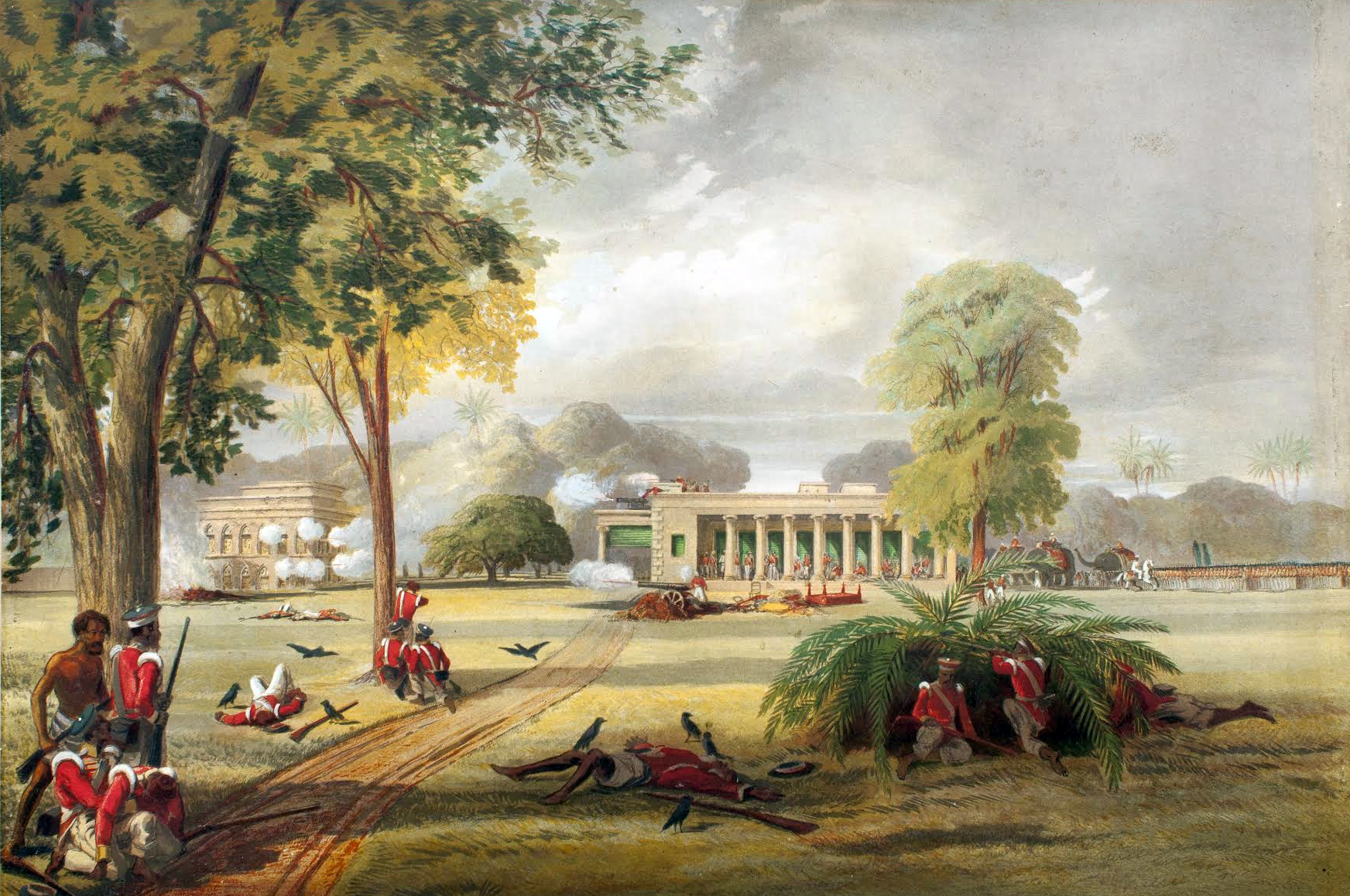
- Author: J.J. Halls
- Language: English
- Subject: Siege of Arrah
- Genre: Historical Account
- Publisher: Longman and Roberts
- Publication date: 1860
- Publication place: England
- Media type: Print

Two Months In Arrah is a book written on the Siege of Arrah in 1857, whose writer is J.J. Halls, an assistant surgeon in the Bengal Army of 1857, who was posted at the civil station of Arrah and was one of the defenders in the siege. The account was originally written for the information of the author's friend in England but was later published in 1860.

== Translations ==
- Bhojpuri Author Pandey Kapil translated this book in Hindi as Ārā me do mās.
