= Ramna Maidan =

Park located in Arrah, Bhojpur District, Bihar, India

Babu Veer Kunwar Singh Ramna Maidan
- Interactive map of Babu Veer Kunwar Singh Ramna Maidan
- Type: Urban Playing Ground
- Location: Arrah, Bihar
- Coordinates: 25.561667°N 84.664167°E
- Area: 60 acres (24 ha)
- Created: 1850s
- Operator: Arrah Municipal Corporation
- Status: Partially Opened

Babu Veer Kunwar Singh Ramna Maidan is located in Arrah, Bhojpur District, Bihar. It is one of the largest urban parks in Arrah and is spread across 60 acres of land.

Reopened .
