= Holy Saviour Church, Arrah =

Church in Arrah, India

- Saint Mary's Church
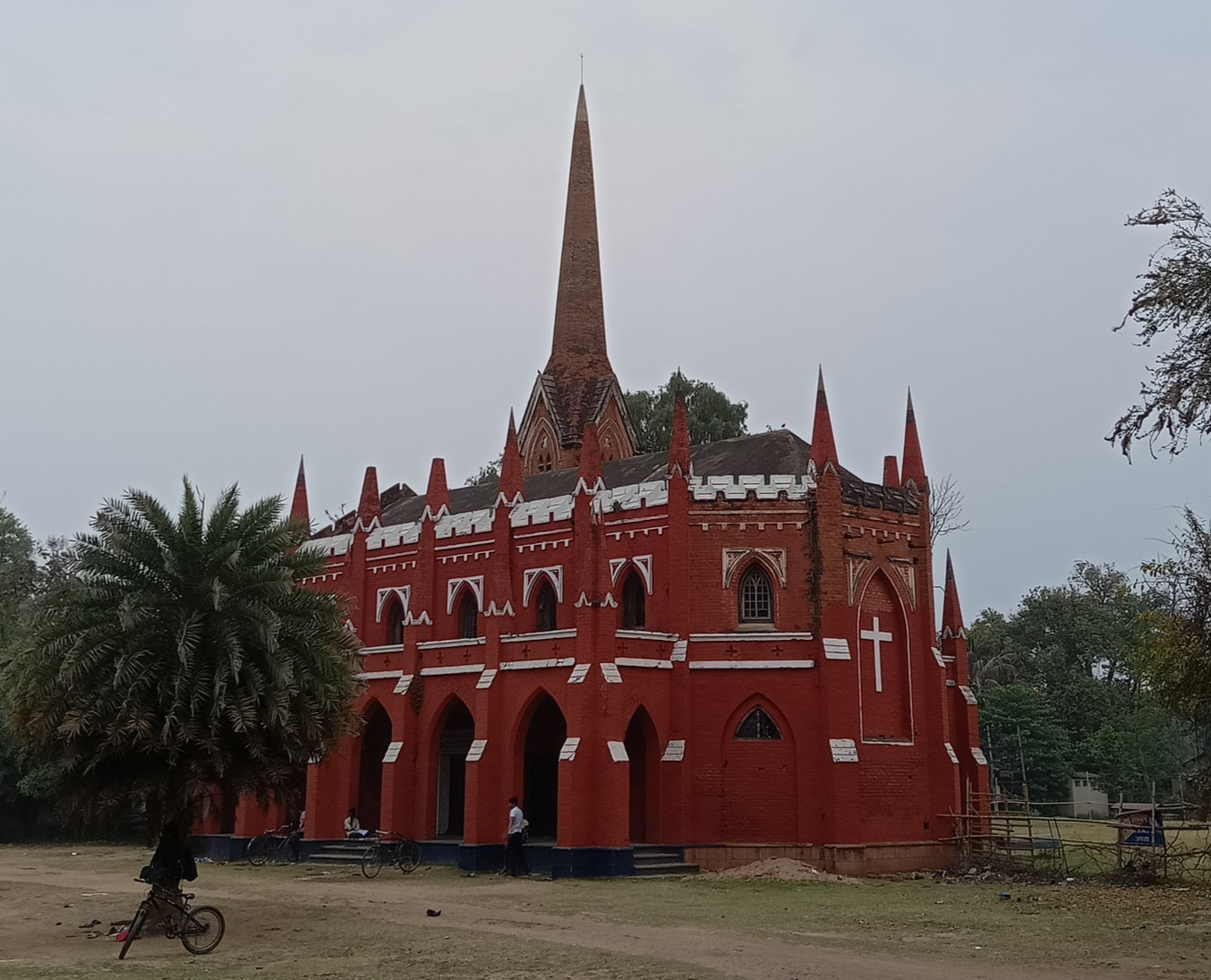
- Holy Saviour Church of Arrah
- Location: Arrah, Bihar, India
- Country: India
- Denomination: Church of India
- Tradition: Anglo-Catholic

Architecture
- Style: Early English Gothic
- Years built: 1910-1911

Administration
- Province: Bihar

Holy Saviour Church of Arrah also known as St. Mary's Church, formally known as the Church of George V, is an Anglican church in Arrah, Bihar. The red-painted church is regarded as a good example of Early English architecture in India.

It was constructed in 1911, for the visit of George V and Queen Mary of Teck who were travelling from Kolkata to Delhi and stopped in Arrah for a day. In view of the auspicious occasion, a church was built for the King's use, as he was deeply religious. A red carpet was laid from the Arrah railway station to the church to welcome the Royals. Following the King's visit, the church became a garrison church.

The church contains memorial plaques in memory of the officers and men, who died in the Sepoy Mutiny of 1857 - 1858. An east window was placed there by Mr Harding, the district judge of Shahabad, to the memory of his wife. After Indian independence in 1947, the church came under the Church of North India. Later it was handed over to the Methodist church.
