= Maharaja College, Arrah =

Constituent college of the Veer Kunwar Singh University, Arrah

Coordinates: 25.55741°N 84.66531°E

Maharaja College
- Veer Kunwar Singh University
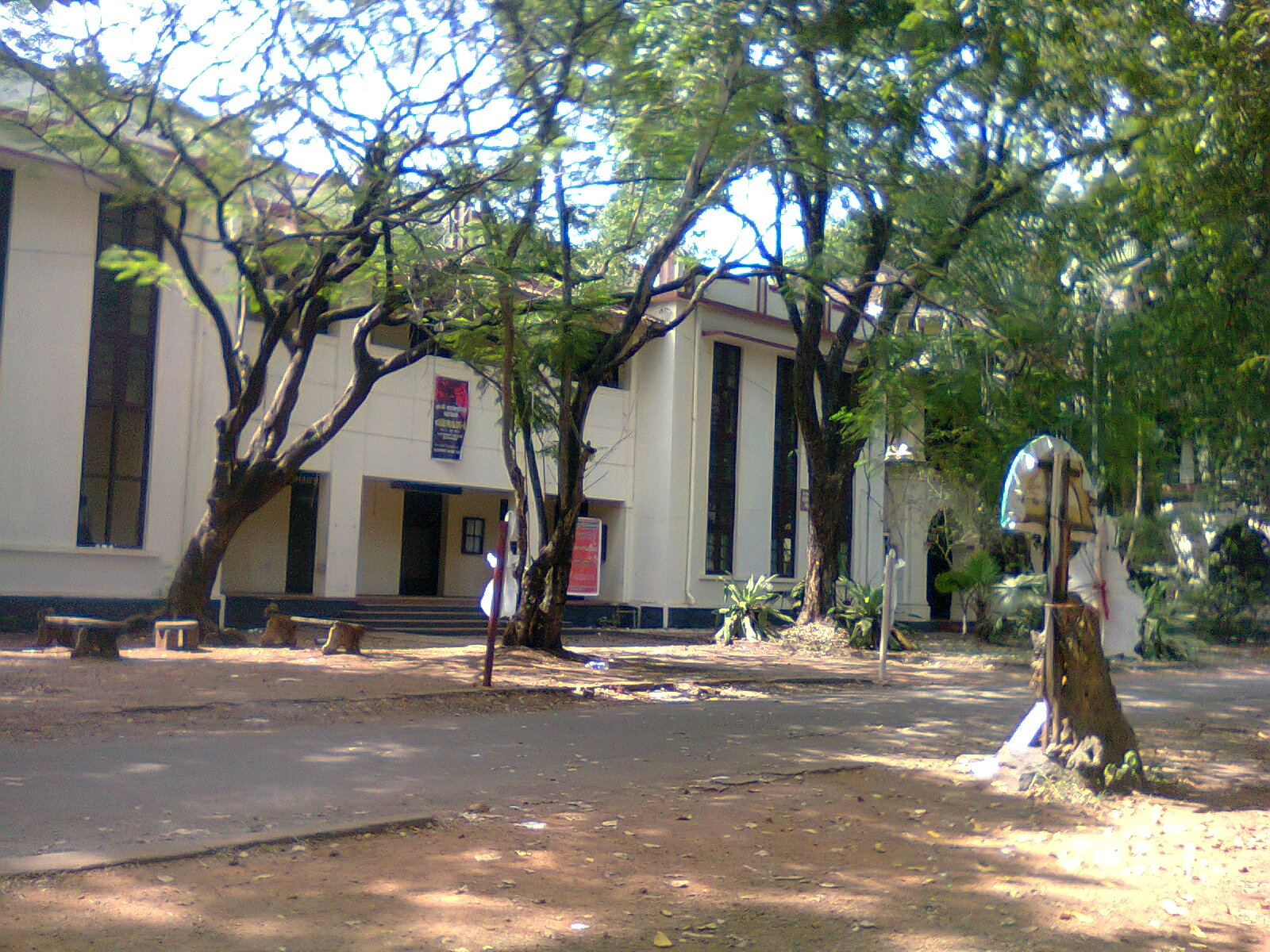
- Maharaja Collage
- Full name: Maharaja Bahadur Ram Ran Vijay Prasad Singh College
- Founder: Maharaja Bahadur Ram Ran Vijay Prasad Singh
- Established: 1954; 72 years ago
- Head: Dr. Narendra Singh
- Website: www.maharajacollege.ac.in/pmessage.htm
- Students' union: www.maharajacollege.ac.in/pmessage.htm

Maharaja College is a constituent college of Veer Kunwar Singh University, Arrah in the Bihar State of India. It was founded on 13 September 1954. It is one of the oldest co-educational institution of south-west Bihar. Originally it was a part of Magadh University but in 1992 after the establishment of Veer Kunwar Singh University it became the part of it.

== History ==
The college was founded by Maharaja Bahadur Ram Ran Vijay Prasad Singh in 1954. The land on which it was founded was historically known as JUDGE SAHEB KE KOTHI. Before that in 1857, this land was the center of revolt in Arrah, when 18 British civilians and 50 members of the Bengal Military Police Battalion were fortified for 8 days in the Arrah House by the army of Veer Kunwar Singh.

== Campus ==
The campus of the college has an area of 8.5 acres and is located 1.5 kilometres from Ara Junction railway station. The main college buildings of the campus are BCA department building, Central Library, Administrative Building, Botenical Garden and Cricket Ground and Arrah House. A study centre of Nalanda Open University is running in the college campus to impart education (about 105 traditional and vocational courses) through distance mode.

The campus has a botanical garden used for teaching Botany and other educational purposes.

=== Cricket Ground ===
The cricket ground is used by Bhojpur district cricket Association for practice and organising other Cricket tournaments and matches. The ground is also used for football, Hockey and Athletics.

=== Arrah House ===
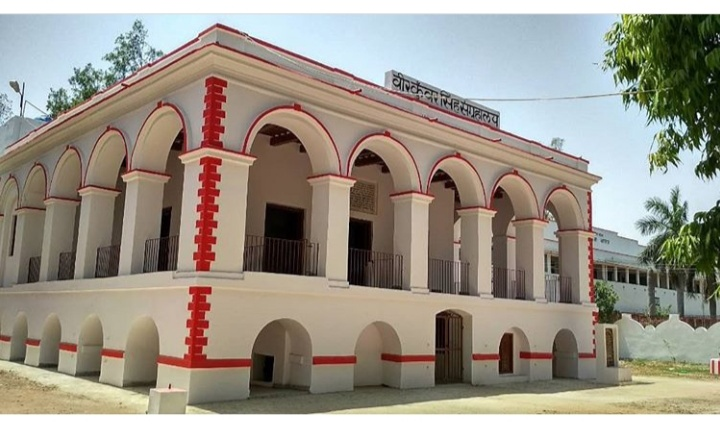
Arrah House

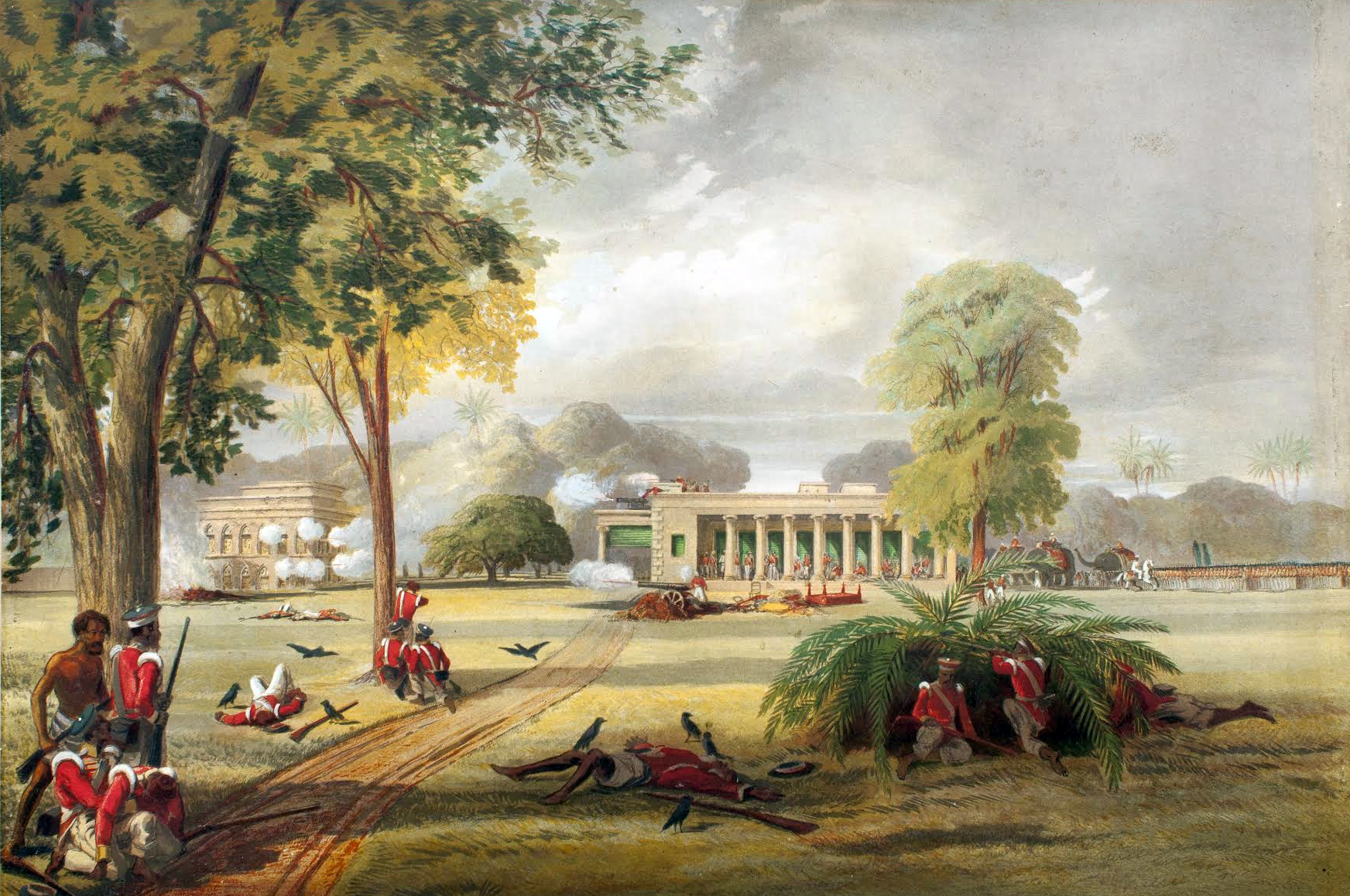
Defence of the Arrah House, 1857 (1858) by William Tayler

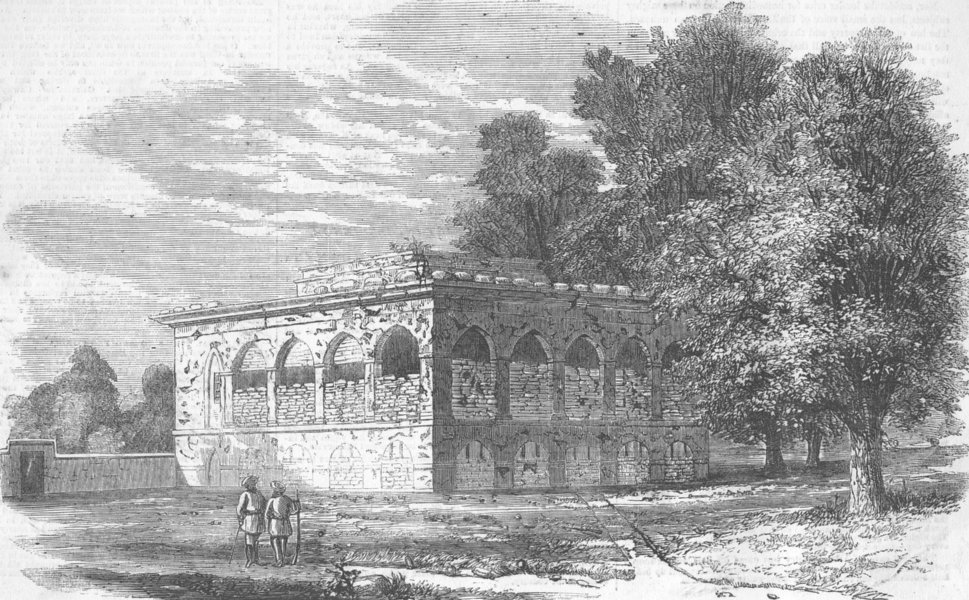
House at Arrah fortified against the Dinapore Mutineers – From a sketch by Sir Vincent Eyre, 1857 from the Illustrated London News (1857)

Arrah House is a historical building in the premises of Maharaja College which preserves the memory of Siege of Arrah during the Indian Rebellion of 1857. The building was a part of the Collector's Residence in Arrah During Company Rule. It was used as a billiard room but later for the accommodation of visitors who used to visit the Collector's Bungalow. Today it is named as Veer Kunwar Singh Museum and is under the supervision of Archaeological Survey of India. It is a 15m×15m square-shaped building, which has a basement consisting of small cellars, which consists of arches some 4-5 feet high. The stair in the interior of basement leads to a single room, which is surrounded from three side by Verandah.

== Departments ==
The collage of following departments:

- Department of Humanities
- Department of Science
- Department of Commerce

== Notable alumni ==
- Sudama Prasad
- Pawan Singh

== Academic programs ==
The college offers PhD, Post Graduate, Undergraduate courses and some vocational courses.
