= Veer Kunwar Singh University =

Public university in Arrah, Bihar, India

- Motto: विद्या धर्मेण शोभते
- Motto in English: Knowledge Shines with Righteousness
- Type: Public
- Established: 22 October 1992 (33 years ago)
- Affiliations: UGC, AIU
- Chancellor: Governor of Bihar
- Vice-Chancellor: Shailendra Kumar Chaturvedi
- Location: Arrah, Bihar, India
- Campus: Urban
- Website: www.vksu.ac.in

Veer Kunwar Singh University is an Indian public university established on 22 October 1992, headquartered at Arrah, under the Bihar University Act 1976 (as amendment Act 9 of 1992). It is named after Kunwar Singh, a national hero and freedom fighter.

It is in the list of recognized universities under section 2(f) of the U.G.C. Act. All of its 17 constituent colleges and one affiliated college receive final assistance from U.G.C. by virtue of being constituent/affiliated colleges of the erstwhile Magadh University in Gaya, Bihar. It is in the list of recognized universities under the AICTE with ID-1-44497171004 for Master of Business Administration and Master in Computer Science. It is in the list of university under the Department of Higher Education, Government of India with code-U-0077 and under Institution's Innovation Council with ID-IC202431006. It is in the list of recognized university under National Council for Teacher Education with Code No-APE00529 for B.Ed course.

== Academics ==
The university conducts teaching and learning in areas such as physics, chemistry, botany, zoology, biotechnology, mathematics, computer science, commerce, history, economics, management, law, sociology, geography, etc. It also runs exchange programs in affiliation with colleges and institutes in and around the state.

== Colleges ==
Its jurisdiction extends over four districts, Bhojpur, Buxar, Kaimur and Rohtas.

=== Affiliated colleges ===
- Sumitra Mahila College Dumraon
- K.K Mandal College Buxar
- P.C College Buxar
- T.S.I.M College, Ara, Bhojpur
- Jan Sahkari College (Barap), Garhani Bhojpur
- D.K College Dumraon, Buxer
- M.V College Buxar
- D.K.M College Dumari
- Jagdeo Memorial College, Kudra, Kaimur
- Indra Parshuram Singh Mahila Mahavidyalaya Chilbili, Kudra, Kaimur

== Constituent colleges ==
Constituent colleges of Veer Kunwar Singh University

- Harprasad Das Jain College, Ara
- Maharaja College, Ara
- S.B. College, Ara
- Jagjiwan College, Arrah
- M.M. Mahila College, Ara
- M.V. College, Buxar
- D.K. College, Dumraon
- Shersah College, Sasaram
- S.P. Jain College, Sasaram
- Rohtas Mahila College, Sasaram
- Sri Shankar College, Sasaram
- A.S. College, Bikramganj
- J.L.N. College, Dehri-on-sone
- S.N. College, ShahmalKhairadeo
- Mahila College, Dalmianagar
- S.V.P. College, Bhabhua
- Gram Bharti College, Ramgarh

== Notable alumni ==
- Pawan Singh (Bhojpuri singer and Actor)
- Alok Kumar (CEO - National Skill Development Corporation International Limited)
