= Arrah Municipal Corporation =

Civic body governing Arrah, Bihar, India

Type
- Type: Municipal corporation

History
- Founded: 2007; 18 years ago

Leadership
- Mayor: Indu Devi
- Deputy Mayor: Punam Devi
- Municipal Commissioner: Dhirendra Paswan
- Seats: 45

Elections
- Last election: 28/12/2022

Meeting place
- Old Police Line Road, Arrah, Bihar - 802301

Website
- nagarseva.bihar.gov.in/arrah

Arrah Municipal Corporation or Arrah Nagar Nigam, abbr. AMC, is the civic body that governs Arrah, a city of Bihar in India. Arrah Municipal Corporation consists of democratically elected members, is headed by a Mayor, and administers the city's infrastructure, public services, and supplies. Municipal Corporation mechanism in India was introduced during British Rule with formation of municipal corporation in Madras (Chennai) in 1688, later followed by municipal corporations in Bombay (Mumbai) and Calcutta (Kolkata) by 1762. Arrah Municipal Corporation is headed by Mayor of city and governed by Commissioner.

== History ==
The Arrah Nagar Panchayat was established in 1929 which was upgraded to a Municipal Council in 2002 and to a Municipal Corporation in 2007. The Arrah Municipal Corporation covers an area of 30.97 sq. km. The Municipal Council had 32 wards as per the census 2001 but following the re-alignment of ward boundaries in 2007 and up-gradation to a corporation, it has 45 wards.

== Functions ==
Arrah Municipal Corporation is created for the following functions:

- Planning for the town including its surroundings which are covered under its Department's Urban Planning Authority .
- Approving construction of new buildings and authorising use of land for various purposes.
- Improvement of the town's economic and Social status.
- Arrangements of water supply towards commercial, residential and industrial purposes.
- Planning for fire contingencies through Fire Service Departments.
- Creation of solid waste management, public health system and sanitary services.
- Working for the development of ecological aspect like development of Urban Forestry and making guidelines for environmental protection.
- Working for the development of weaker sections of the society like mentally and physically handicapped, old age and gender biased people.
- Making efforts for improvement of slums and poverty removal in the town.

== Revenue ==
The following are the Income sources for the Corporation from the Central and State Government

=== Revenue from taxes ===
Following is the Tax related revenue for the corporation:

- Property tax
- Profession tax
- Entertainment tax
- Grants from Central and State Government like Goods and Services Tax
- Advertisement tax

=== Revenue from non-tax sources ===
Following is the Non Tax related revenue for the corporation:

- Water usage charges
- Fees from Documentation services
- Rent received from municipal property
- Funds from municipal bonds
