= Piro Assembly constituency =

Former Assembly constituency in Bihar, India

Coordinates: 25.33°N 84.40°E

Piro
- Former constituency for the Bihar Legislative Assembly

Constituency details
- Country: India
- Region: East India
- State: Bihar
- Lok Sabha constituency: Bikramganj
- Established: 1952
- Abolished: 2008

Piro was an Assembly constituency in Bihar which existed until 2008. It came under Bikramganj Lok Sabha constituency. From 2008 the seat was succeeded by Tarari Assembly constituency. Sunil Pandey was the last MLA from this constituency.

== Members of Legislative Assembly ==
| Year | Member | Party |
|---|---|---|
| 1952 | Devidayal Ram | Socialist Party |
| 1957 | Sumitra Devi | Indian National Congress |
| 1957 | Nagina Dusadh | Indian National Congress |
| 1962 | Indramani Singh | Indian National Congress |
| 1967 | R. M. Rai | Samyukta Socialist Party |
| 1969 | Ram Ekbal Singh Warsi | Samyukta Socialist Party |
| 1972 | Jay Narayan | Indian National Congress |
| 1977 | Raghupati Gop | Janata Party |
| 1980 | Muni Singh | Indian National Congress (I) |
| 1985 | Raghupati Gop | Lokdal |
| 1990 | Chander Deep Singh | Indian People's Front |
| 1995 | Kanti Singh | Janata Dal |
| 2000 | Narendra Kumar Pandey | Samata Party |
| 2005 | Narendra Kumar Pandey | Janata Dal (United) |
| 2005 | Narendra Kumar Pandey | Janata Dal (United) |
2010 onwards : See Tarari Assembly constituency
