= Raghupati Gop =

Indian politician

MLA, Bihar Legislative Assembly
- In office 1977–1980
- Preceded by: Jay Narayan
- Succeeded by: Muni Singh
- Constituency: Piro
- In office 1985–1990
- Preceded by: Muni Singh
- Succeeded by: Chander Deep Singh
- Constituency: Piro

Personal details
- Born: Charpokhari, Shahabad district, Bihar
- Died: 3 August 2019 Charpokhari, Arrah, Bihar
- Party: Janata Party; Lok Dal
- Children: Brij Bahadur Singh
- Occupation: Politician

Raghupati Gop was an Indian politician. He was elected as a member of Bihar Legislative Assembly from Piro constituency now known as Tarari Assembly constituency.

== Death ==
Gop died on 3 August 2019. He was cremated in the presence of all local leaders across the party line, at his ancestral village in Charpokhari, Arrah district.

== See also ==
- Tarari Assembly constituency
- Arrah Lok Sabha constituency
