= Meena Singh =

Indian politician

Member of Parliament (MP) Lok Sabha
- In office 2008–2009
- Preceded by: Ajit Kumar Singh
- Succeeded by: Constituency disestablished
- Constituency: Bikramganj

Member of Parliament (MP) Lok Sabha
- In office 2009–2014
- Preceded by: Kanti Singh
- Succeeded by: R. K. Singh
- Constituency: Arrah

Personal details
- Born: 1 January 1962 (age 64) Varanasi, Uttar Pradesh, India
- Party: Janata Dal United
- Spouse: Ajit Singh
- Children: 1
- Education: Banaras Hindu University

Meena Singh (born 1 January 1962 in Varanasi, Uttar Pradesh) is an Indian politician. She entered politics in 2008. She represented Bikramganj (Lok Sabha constituency) in 14th Lok Sabha and Arrah (Lok Sabha constituency) in the 15th Lok Sabha as a member of Janata Dal (United).

== Early life ==
Meena Singh was born to Naina Devi and Rameshwar Singh. She got a degree in arts from Banaras Hindu University in 1982. Before entering into the Indian politics, she was serving her husband's constituency people and was a house wife.

== Political career ==
Meena Singh was first elected as MP in January 2008 by-election from Bikramganj after her husband's death, but she resigned just after 6 months because of Rahul Raj encounter. She was again elected to Arrah (Lok Sabha constituency) in 2009 from Janata Dal United. However, she lost the 16th Lok Sabha election in 2014.

== Personal life ==
Meena Singh married Ajit Kumar Singh, a full-time politician by profession. They have a son, Vishal Singh (born 23 January 1987), who holds a Bachelor of Business Administration from Amity Business School. Ajit Singh died in 2007.
