= Shiopujan Shastri =

Indian politician

Shivpujan Shastri

Member of Parliament, Lok Sabha
- In office 1967–1977
- Preceded by: Ram Subhag Singh
- Succeeded by: Ram Awadhesh Singh
- Constituency: Bikramganj, Bihar

Personal details
- Born: January 1908 Niranjanpur, Nokha Rohtas, Bihar, British India
- Died: May 1983 (aged 75) Niranjanpur
- Party: Indian National Congress
- Spouse: Lakhrani Devi
- Children: 02
- Profession: Former MP

Shiopujan Shastri (born January 1908, date of death May 1983) was an Indian politician. He was elected to the Lok Sabha, the lower house of the Parliament of India from Bikramganj constituency in Bihar as a member of the Indian National Congress.
