= Tapeshwar Singh =

Indian politician

Member of Parliament, Lok Sabha
- In office 1980–1989
- Preceded by: Ram Awadhesh Singh
- Succeeded by: Ram Prasad Singh
- Constituency: Bikramganj, Bihar

Personal details
- Died: 06/06/1997
- Party: Indian National Congress

Tapeshwar Singh is an Indian politician. He was elected to the Lok Sabha, the lower house of the Parliament of India from Bikramganj constituency in Bihar as a member of the Indian National Congress.
