= Hardiya, Tarari =

Hardiya
- Village
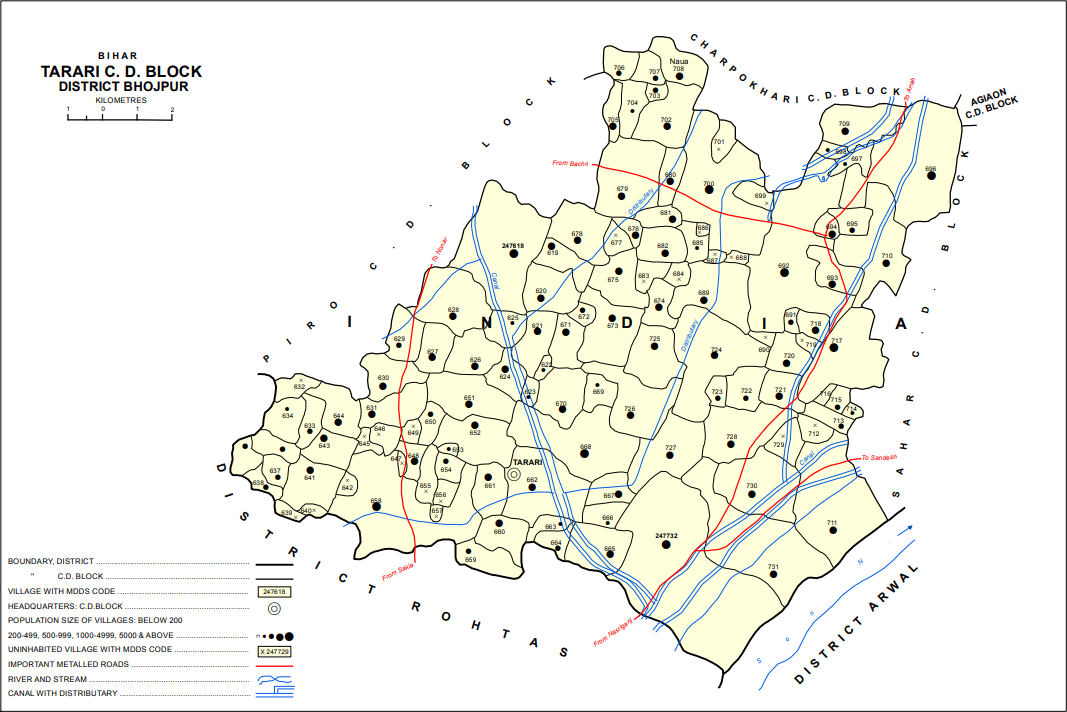
- Map showing Hardiya (#627) in Tarari block

- Location in Bihar, India Hardiya (India)
- Coordinates: 25.2477°N 84.37949°E
- Country: India
- State: Bihar
- District: Bhojpur

Area
  - Total: 1.17 km^{2} (0.45 sq mi)
- Elevation: 87 m (285 ft)

Population (2011)
  - Total: 1,591
  - Density: 1,360/km^{2} (3,520/sq mi)

Languages
  - Official: Bhojpuri, Hindi
- Time zone: UTC+5:30 (IST)

Hardiya is a village in Tarari block of Bhojpur district, Bihar, India. It is located in the western part of the block, near the border with Piro block. As of 2011, its population was 1,591, in 216 households.
