= Piro, Bihar =

Piro
- Nagar Parishad
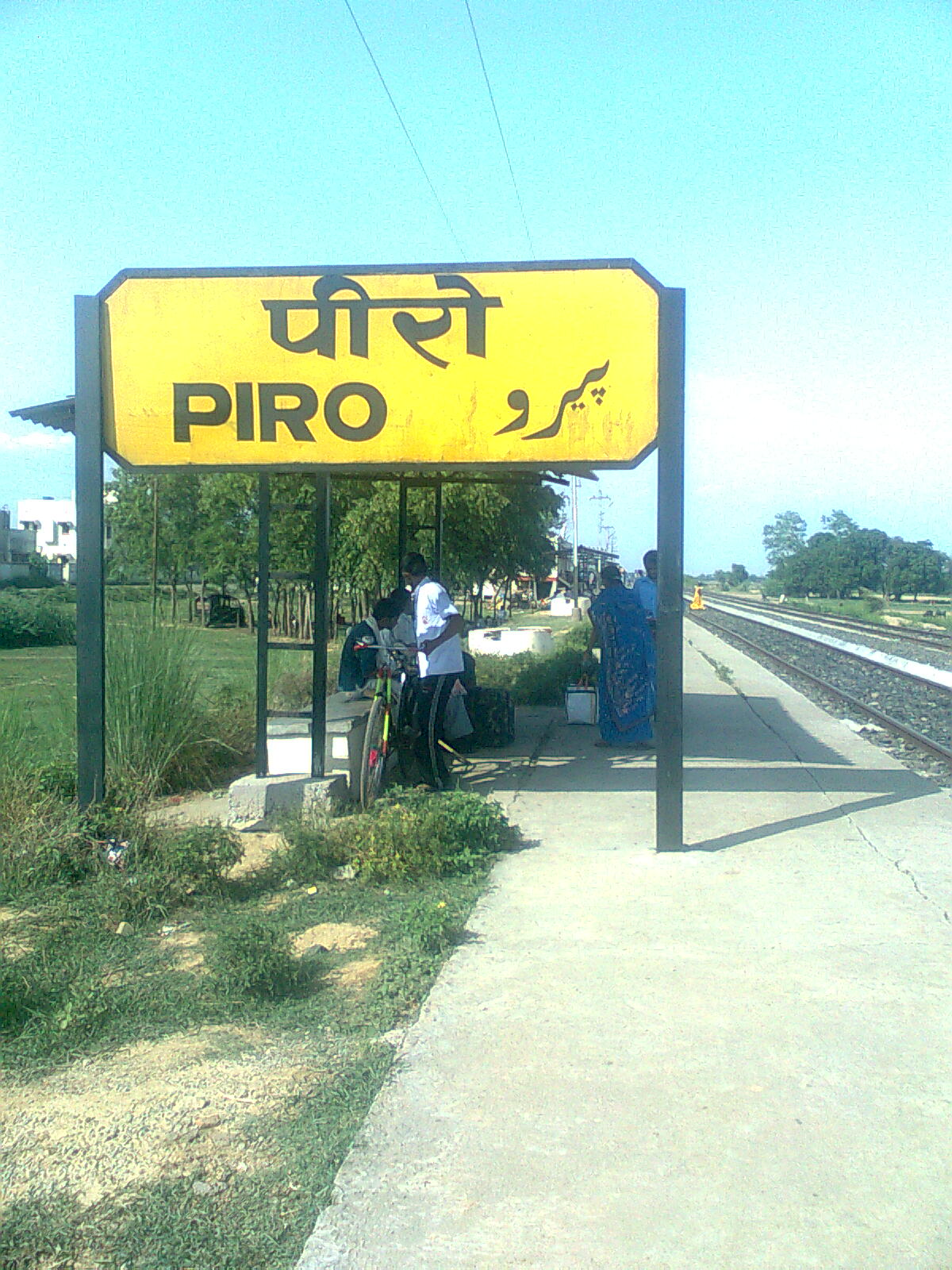
- Piro railway station

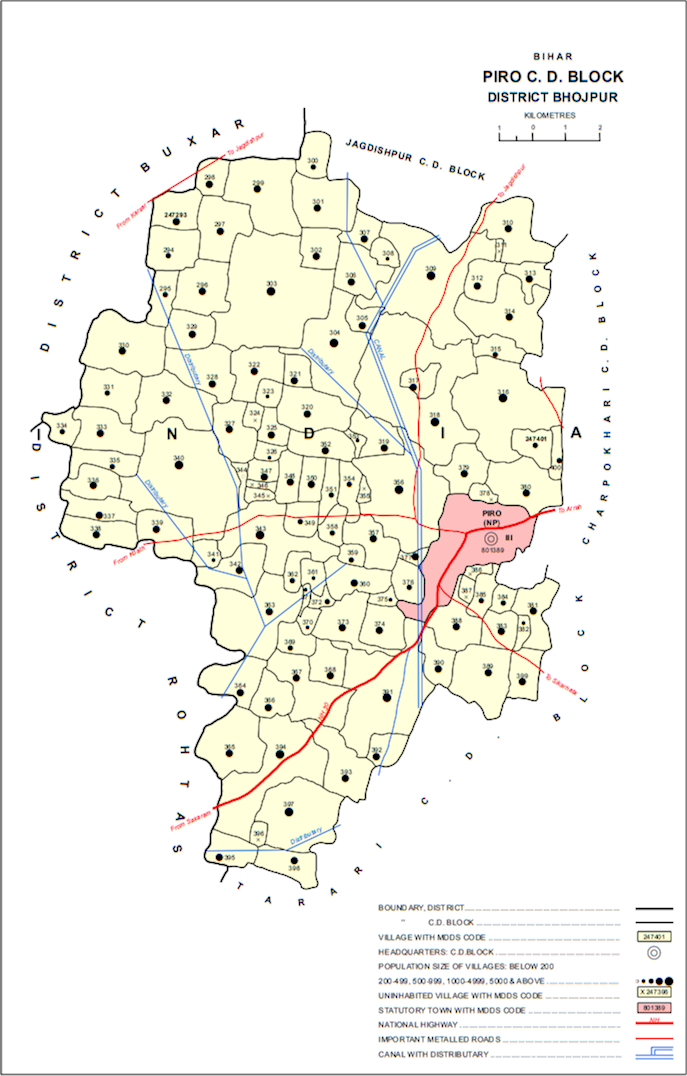
- Location of Piro block in Bhojpur District

- Location in Bihar, India
- Coordinates: 25.33°N 84.42°E
- Country: India
- State: Bihar
- District: Bhojpur

Government
  - Type: Piro Nagar Parishad
  - Body: Municipal Corporation
  - M.L.A: Vishal Prashant
- Elevation: 72 m (236 ft)

Population (2024)
  - Total: 80,000
- Time zone: UTC+5:30 (IST)
- PIN: 802207
- Telephone code: 06181
- Vehicle registration: BR-03
- Website: bhojpur.bih.nic.in

Piro (historically spelled as Peeroo) is a nagar parishad town and corresponding community development block in Bhojpur District, in the Indian state of Bihar. Piro is 39 km from the Ara Railway Station. Jitaura is 6 km from Piro.

== Geography ==
Piro is located at 25.33°N 84.42°E. It has an average elevation of 72 metres (236 feet).

== Demographics ==
Historical population
Year	Pop.	±%
1981	14,068	—
1991	18,419	+30.9%
2001	25,811	+40.1%
2011	33,785	+30.9%
Source: 2011 Census of India

As of 2001 India census, Piro had a population of 25,638. Males constitute 53% of the population and females 47%. Piro has an average literacy rate of 56%, lower than the national average of 59.5%: male literacy is 65%, and female literacy is 45%.

In Piro, 18% of the population is under 6 years of age.

As of 2011 the population of the town of Piro was 45,000 in 7,033 households.

== Administration ==
The Piro sub-division (Tehsil) is headed by an IAS or state Civil service officer of the rank of Sub Divisional Magistrate (SDM).

=== Blocks ===
The Piro Tehsil is divided into 3 Blocks, each headed by a Block Development Officer (BDO). List of Blocks is as follows:

1. Piro
2. Charpokhari
3. Tarari

Piro Balua Tola is one of the most developed village in Piro block.

== List of villages ==
Piro block contains the following 109 villages:

Village name	Total land area (hectares)	Population (in 2011)
Lohain	166	2,000
Balua Tola	85	1620
Newari	201	843
Khairahin	110	616
Kheri Kon	263	2,016
Pharaura	237	1,698
Karauniya	91	1,052
Ear	404	3,821
Kukrahan	130	955
Waina	296	1,585
Danwarua	148	1,436
Tar	943	6,123
Jamuaon	452	5,006
Saneya	74	1,843
Bamhawar	201	4,190
Chaubepur	85	1,041
Marohi	61	340
Chhaurahi Jangal Mahal	766	5,949
Keshwa	277	3,018
Bishambharpur	14	0
Haswa Dehri	132	1,530
Rajapur	98	1,588
Akrua	395	3,309
Kaser	122	844
Barao	625	7,230
Hat Pokhar	77	1,272
Jitaura Jangal Mahal	969	11,292
Rajeyan	149	2,561
Baseya	230	1,943
Mahwari	75	1,081
Doman Dehra	221	2,033
Khambha Dih	51	427
Chanwa	36	0
Puraini Buzurg	80	1,000
Puraini Khurd	40	234
Pitro	202	3,418
Khandani	262	2,266
Khandani Khurd	146	1,516
Angra	371.1	2,384
Pitat	217.4	892
Kothua	309	2,770
Dhanpura	231	1,686
Birpur	87	769
Salakhna	123.9	656
Mahuari	140	1,060
Kewatia	146	1,145
Basdiha	171	1,212
Amehta	191	3,052
Lahthan	898	6,516
Anuwan	68	347
Telar	214	2,930
Agiaon	373	7,545
Baraura	43	192
Beduwa	31	0
Bedauli	27	0
Narhi	63	1,215
Narayanpur	112	1,358
Dihri	102	999
Baghaunr	99	1,343
Sugibal	86	547
Mothi	168	1,567
Mothibal Jangal Mahal	31	375
Jagdishpur Patak	96	769
Bahri Mahadeo	26.5	0
Naek Tola Jangal Mahal	646	6,860
Barauli	176	1,705
Tewari Dih	68	891
Rangal Tola Jangal Mahal	47	669
Sukhrauli	165	1,766
Jagdeopur	59	436
Gogsand	62	937
Kataria	496	3,841
Basmanpur	179	1,894
Amai	317.9	3,826
Tetar Dih	151	1,726
Sahejani	308	2,958
Rasauli	121	1,954
Jamunipur	103	559
Indarpatpur	36	438
Chhechhu Dih	17	492
Moti Dih	40	538
Pachrukhia	235	2,464
Kachnath	151	1,769
Udan Dih	41	484
Ujjain Dehra	92.9	599
Ojhawaliya	20	265
Lohrabad	29	1,601
Gajra Dih	39	0
Deochanda	169	1,170
Tilath	295	2,886
Jaisingh Dih	170	1,470
Manaini	34	238
Tiwari Dih	99	1,177
Itamba Ganesh	57	856
Chilbilia	92	966
Khorain	27	0
Dano Dih	31	0
Bachri	257	3,476
Bharsar	325	2,861
Gobind Dih	118	1,414
Nonar	677	7,835
Baisa Dih	89.5	1,671
Pachman	250	2,344
Katar	594	13,484
Garahatha	121.8	1,120
Harpur	30	0
Narayanpur	442	6,232
Jamaurahi	150.7	2,128
Bhulkua	151	1,427
Kachhuhi	57	776
Dhan Pokhar	124	783
Pasaur Tola	85	790
