= Itamba Ganesh =

- Village
- Location in Bihar, India Itamba Ganesh (India)
- Coordinates: 25.31342°N 84.41242°E
- Country: India
- State: Bihar
- District: Bhojpur

Area
  - Total: 0.57 km^{2} (0.22 sq mi)
- Elevation: 82 m (269 ft)

Population (2011)
  - Total: 856
  - Density: 1,500/km^{2} (3,900/sq mi)

Languages
  - Official: Bhojpuri, Hindi
- Time zone: UTC+5:30 (IST)

Itamba Ganesh is a village in Piro block of Bhojpur district, Bihar, India. It is located southeast of Piro. As of 2011, its population was 856, in 128 households.
