= Sunil Pandey =

Indian politician

Chairman of Agriculture and Industrial Development Committee Government of Bihar
- In office 2012–2015

Member of Bihar Legislative Assembly
- In office 2010–2015
- Preceded by: constituency established
- Succeeded by: Sudama Prasad
- Constituency: Tarari
- In office 2000–2010
- Preceded by: Kanti Singh
- Succeeded by: constituency abolished
- Constituency: Piro

Personal details
- Born: Narendra Kumar Pandey Nawadih, Aurangabad, Bihar
- Party: Bharatiya Janata Party
- Other political affiliations: Rashtriya Lok Janshakti Party Lok Janshakti Party; Independent; Janata Dal (United) Samata Party
- Spouse: Geeta Pandey
- Children: 4
- Education: Veer Kunwar Singh University, Arrah
- Profession: Politician; Social Worker
- Nickname: Sunil Pandey

Narendra Kumar Pandey, well known by his other name Sunil Pandey, is an Indian politician from Rohtas Bihar.

== Career ==
Dr. Narendra Kumar Pandey was elected in 2000 in the Piro constituency for the Samta Party. He was re-elected three times. In the assembly election of February 2005 he won by a margin of 35679. Because of all the parties failed to form government, President's rule was imposed in the State and after a few months Bihar's state assembly was dissolved, elections were held again in October month in which NDA came to power with Nitish Kumar as the Chief Minister and in the same year he went in JD(U) before election and lodged his victory again.

Pandey was nominated as the Chairman of Agriculture and Industrial Development committee of Bihar. Before the state assembly election of 2015 he resigned from JD(U) on 25 September 2015 after completing his successful 4 elections. He later joined LJP as a spokesman.
