= Sudama Prasad =

Indian politician

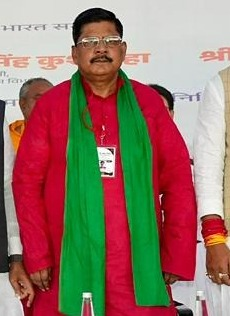

Member of Parliament, Lok Sabha
- Incumbent
- Assumed office 4 June 2024
- Preceded by: R. K. Singh
- Constituency: Arrah

Member of Bihar Legislative Assembly
- In office 2015–2024
- Preceded by: Sunil Pandey
- Succeeded by: Vishal Prashant
- Constituency: Tarari

Personal details
- Born: 2 February 1961 (age 65)
- Party: Communist Party of India (Marxist–Leninist) Liberation

Sudama Prasad (born 2 February 1961) is an Indian politician who serves as a Member of Parliament in the 18th Lok Sabha from Arrah. He was elected in the 2024 Indian General Election as a candidate of Communist Party of India (Marxist–Leninist) Liberation.

Earlier, he was a two-term Bihar Legislative Assembly representative from Tarari, having won in 2015 and 2020.

Prasad is a member of principal state committee of the Communist Party of India (Marxist–Leninist) Liberation.

== Political career ==
Prasad was active in the Bhojpur district of Bihar from 1997 onwards, belonging to the category of Other Backward Class (OBC). He is a member of Kanu caste. In a drive to social reforms, he married Shobha Mandal, who belonged to Schedule Caste in 1993. He later became a member of the Communist Party of India (Marxist–Leninist) Liberation and was elected to its state committee. He was also accused in the murder case of an upper caste landlord which went to the Supreme Court of India. The court, however, acquitted him, ruling that he was victimised by the accusation and that the witnesses had given false testimonies to the court.

In the 2015 Bihar Legislative Assembly election, the Communist Party of India (Marxist–Leninist) Liberation fielded him as the candidate for the Tarari constituency and he was subsequently elected to the Bihar Legislative Assembly. The victory was seen as a regaining of a traditional stronghold of the party that had come under the domination of landlord backed candidates. He later supported the successful campaign of the Dalit activist and independent candidate Jignesh Mevani for the Vadgam assembly constituency in 2017 Gujarat Legislative Assembly election.

As a member of the legislative assembly, Prasad has participated in several agitations and highlighted concerns on issues such as demands for adequate prices of makka (Maize), the Dalit Asmita Yatra called in the aftermath of the 2016 Una flogging incident, and mob lynchings in the state. Following the 2019 Bihar floods, he visited flood-hit areas in his constituency and organised new housing for villagers in flooded areas. Prasad participated in organising rescue operations with party workers between 18–24 July. According to him, the Nitish Kumar government had not initiated adequate measures for relief and rescue.

In the 2024 Loksabha Election, Prasad's party was part of the Indian National Developmental Inclusive Alliance and he was nominated as the candidate for Arrah. He faced against the two-term MP and Union Cabinet Minister in the Government of India (2014 - 2024), R. K. Singh and won with the margin of 59808 votes.
