= Chilbilia =

Chilbilia Chilbiliya
- Village
- Location in Bihar, India Chilbilia (India)
- Coordinates: 25.31702°N 84.41005°E
- Country: India
- State: Bihar
- District: Bhojpur

Area
  - Total: 0.92 km^{2} (0.36 sq mi)
- Elevation: 84 m (276 ft)

Population (2011)
  - Total: 966
  - Density: 1,100/km^{2} (2,700/sq mi)

Languages
  - Official: Bhojpuri, Hindi
- Time zone: UTC+5:30 (IST)

Chilbilia, also spelled Chilbiliya is a village in Piro block of Bhojpur district, Bihar, India. It is located southeast of Piro. As of 2011, its population was 966, in 148 households.
