= Katar, Bhojpur =

Katar Kātar
- Village
- Location in Bihar, India Katar (India)
- Coordinates: 25.26714°N 84.35431°E
- Country: India
- State: Bihar
- District: Bhojpur

Area
  - Total: 5.94 km^{2} (2.29 sq mi)
- Elevation: 89 m (292 ft)

Population (2011)
  - Total: 13,484
  - Density: 2,270/km^{2} (5,880/sq mi)

Languages
  - Official: Bhojpuri, Hindi
- Time zone: UTC+5:30 (IST)

Katar is a large village in Piro block of Bhojpur district, Bihar, India. It is located south of Piro, near NH 30. As of 2011, its population was 13,484, in 1,970 households.
