= Arrah Lok Sabha constituency =

Lok Sabha constituency in Bihar, India

Coordinates: 25.6°N 84.7°E

Arrah
- Lok Sabha constituency

Constituency details
- Country: India
- Region: East India
- State: Bihar
- Assembly constituencies: Sandesh; Barhara; Arrah; Agiaon; Tarari; Jagdishpur; Shahpur
- Established: 1957 (Shahabad); 1977 (Arrah)
- Reservation: None

Member of Parliament
- 18th Lok Sabha
- Incumbent Sudama Prasad
- Party: CPI(ML)L
- Alliance: INDIA
- Elected year: 2024
- Preceded by: Raj Kumar Singh; BJP

Arrah (formerly Shahabad) is one of the 40 Lok Sabha (parliamentary) constituencies in Bihar, India. It is a part of the Bhojpur district and comprises seven Assembly constituencies: Sandesh, Barhara, Arrah, Agiaon (SC), Tarari, Jagdishpur and Shahpur.

== About ==
In 1977, the erstwhile Shahabad Lok Sabha constituency was renamed as Arrah Lok Sabha.

== Assembly segments ==
=== 1976-2008 ===
From 1976 to 2008, the Arrah Lok Sabha constituency had 6 Bihar Legislative Assembly seats. Maner and Paliganj from Patna district and Sandesh, Barhara, Arrah and Sahar from Bhojpur district.

=== 2008-Present ===
Arrah Lok Sabha constituency comprises the following seven Bihar Legislative Assembly seats, all from Bhojpur district.

No	Name	District	Member	2025	2024 lead
192	Sandesh	Bhojpur	Radha Charan Sah	JD(U)	BJP
193	Barhara	Bhojpur	Raghvendra Pratap Singh	BJP	BJP
194	Arrah	Bhojpur	Sanjay Singh Tiger	BJP	CPI(ML)L
195	Agiaon (SC)	Bhojpur	Mahesh Paswan	BJP	CPI(ML)L
196	Tarari	Bhojpur	Vishal Prashant	BJP	CPI(ML)L
197	Jagdishpur	Bhojpur	Shri Bhagwan Singh Kushwaha	JD(U)	BJP
198	Shahpur	Bhojpur	Rakesh Ojha	BJP	BJP

== Members of Parliament ==
=== 1952-1957 ===
See Patna-cum-Shahabad Lok Sabha constituency for 1st Lok Sabha.

=== 1957-1977 ===
See Shahabad Lok Sabha constituency. It was in existence from 2nd to 5th Lok Sabha

=== 1977-Present ===
As present day Arrah Lok Sabha constituency. It is in existence since the 6th Lok Sabha. The erstwhile Shahabad district was bifurcated into Bhojpur district (Arrah) and Rohtas district (Sasaram) in year 1972.

Year	Name	Party
1977	Chandradeo Prasad Verma	Janata Party
1980	Chandradeo Prasad Verma	Janata Party (Secular)
1984	Bali Ram Bhagat	Indian National Congress
1989	Rameshwar Prasad	Indian People's Front
1991	Ram Lakhan Singh Yadav	Janata Dal
1996	Chandradeo Prasad Verma	Janata Dal
1998	Haridwar Prasad Kushwaha	Samata Party
1999	Ram Prasad Kushwaha	Rashtriya Janata Dal
2004	Kanti Singh	Rashtriya Janata Dal
2009	Meena Singh	Janata Dal (United)
2014	R. K. Singh	Bharatiya Janata Party
2019	R. K. Singh	Bharatiya Janata Party
2024	Sudama Prasad	Communist Party of India (Marxist-Leninist) Liberation

== Election results ==
Vote share of Winning candidates
2024	48.28%
2019	52.42%
2014	43.78%
2009	38.24%
2004	38.03%
1999	38.74%
1998	39.41%
1996	30.13%
1991	40.92%
1989	32.65%
1984	53.19%
1980	38.43%
1977	70.67%

=== 2024 ===
2024 Indian general election: Arrah
Party	Candidate	Votes	%	±%
CPI(ML)L	Sudama Prasad	529,382	48.28	
BJP	R. K. Singh	469,574	42.82	
IND	Virendra Kumar Singh	23,635	2.16	
NOTA	None of the Above	16,963	1.55	
IND	Shiv Das Singh	13,379	1.22	
IND	3 Independent Candidates	12,834	1.17	
OTH	7 Other Party Candidates	30,794	2.81	
Majority		59,808	5.46	
Turnout		1,097,080	50.24	
Swing to CPI(ML)L from BJP		Swing		

=== 2019 ===
2019 Indian general election: Arrah
Party	Candidate	Votes	%	±%
BJP	R. K. Singh	566,480	52.42	
CPI(ML)L	Raju Yadav	419,195	38.79	
NOTA	None of the Above	21,825	2.02	
IND	4 Independent Candidates	35,392	3.27	
OTH	5 Other Party Candidates	37,792	3.50	
Majority		147,285	13.63	
Turnout		1,082,464	51.81	
BJP hold		Swing		

=== 2014 ===
2014 Indian general election: Arrah
Party	Candidate	Votes	%	±%
BJP	Raj Kumar Singh	391,074	43.78	
RJD	Sribhagwan Singh Kushwaha	255,204	28.57	
CPI(ML)L	Raju Yadav	98,805	11.06	
JD(U)	Meena Singh	75,962	8.50	
NOTA	None of the Above	14,703	1.65	
IND	3 Independent Candidates	18,794	2.10	
OTH	5 Other Party Candidates	38,671	4.33	
Majority		135,870	15.21	
Turnout		893,213	48.96	
Swing to BJP from JD(U)		Swing		

=== 2009 ===
2009 Indian general election: Arrah
Party	Candidate	Votes	%	±%
JD(U)	Meena Singh	212,726	38.24	
LJP	Rama Kishore Singh	138,006	24.81	
CPI(ML)L	Arun Singh	115,966	20.84	
BSP	Reeta Singh	21,688	3.90	
INC	Haridwar Prasad Singh	20,519	3.69	
IND	4 Independent Candidates	27,134	4.88	
OTH	7 Other Party Candidates	20,312	3.65	
Majority		74,720	13.43	
Turnout				
Swing to JD(U) from RJD		Swing		

=== 2004 ===
2004 Indian general election: Arrah
Party	Candidate	Votes	%	±%
RJD	Kanti Singh	299,422	38.03	
CPI(ML)L	Ram Naresh Ram	149,679	19.01	
IND	Brahmeshwar Nath Singh	148,973	18.92	
JD(U)	Ashok Kumar Verma	147,525	18.74	
SAP	Haridwar Prasad Singh	11,776	1.50	
SP	Narendra Kumar Singh	7,699	0.98	
BSP	Ram Kundal Sharma	7,050	0.90	
IND	Rameshwar Prasad Gupta	5,604	0.71	
JP	Rameshwar Kumar Bharti	4,539	0.58	
IND	Rana Singh	2,881	0.37	
ABJS	Jitendra Tiwary	2,251	0.29	
Majority		149,743	19.02	
Turnout				
RJD hold		Swing		

=== 1999 ===
1999 Indian general election: Arrah
Party	Candidate	Votes	%	±%
RJD	Ram Prasad Singh	264,140	38.74	
JD(U)	H. P. Singh	171,858	25.21	
CPI(ML)L	Rameshwar Prasad	141,939	20.82	
IND	Rang Bahadur Singh	87,263	12.80	
IND	2 Independent Candidates	1,423	0.20	
OTH	8 Other Party Candidates	15,166	2.23	
Majority		92,282	13.53	
Turnout		689,472	61.46	
Swing to RJD from SAP		Swing		

=== 1998 ===
1998 Indian general election: Arrah
Party	Candidate	Votes	%	±%
SAP	H. P. Singh	286,286	39.41	
RJD	Chandra Deo Prasad Verma	228,122	31.41	
CPI(ML)L	Krishna Deo Yadav	163,945	22.57	
BJC (Note: Bihar Jana Congress)	Ram Lakhan Singh Yadav	24,886	3.43	
INC	Siddhnath Ray	5,744	0.79	
JD	Punam Singh	4,660	0.64	
IND	7 Independent Candidates	10,274	1.42	
OTH	3 Other Party Candidates	2,456	0.33	
Majority		58,164	8.00	
Turnout		736,254	65.88	
Swing to SAP from JD		Swing		

=== 1996 ===
1996 Indian general election: Arrah
Party	Candidate	Votes	%	±%
JD	Chandra Deo Prasad Verma	192,046	30.13	
SAP	Ram Prasad Singh	151,005	23.69	
CPI(ML)L	Rameshwar Prasad	146,398	22.97	
INC	Ram Lakhan Singh Yadav	124,628	19.55	
AIIC(T)	Amlendu Satya Vrat Pandey	3,658	0.57	
IND	53 Independent Candidates	17,755	2.76	
OTH	3 Other Party Candidates	1,835	0.29	
Majority		41,041	6.44	
Turnout		644,523	58.49	
JD hold		Swing		

=== 1991 ===
1991 Indian general election: Arrah
Party	Candidate	Votes	%	±%
JD	Ram Lakhan Singh Yadav	275,320	40.92	
JP	Surajdeo Singh	219,972	32.69	
IPF	Rameshwar Prasad	117,262	17.43	
BJP	Ramdeo Mahto	27,031	4.02	
INC	Shrikant Nirala	21,986	3.27	
IND	27 Independent Candidates	8,325	1.26	
OTH	6 Other Party Candidates	3,011	0.44	
Majority		55,348	8.23	
Turnout		689,440	64.40	
Swing to JD from IPF		Swing		

=== 1989 ===
1989 Indian general election: Arrah
Party	Candidate	Votes	%	±%
IPF	Rameshwar Prasad	178,211	32.65	
JD	Tulsi Singh	161,771	29.64	
INC	Baliram Bhagat	125,384	22.97	
BJP	Satinder Narayan Singh	54,246	9.94	
IND	13 Independent Candidates	12,439	2.28	
OTH	4 Other Party Candidates	13,740	2.52	
Majority		16,440	3.01	
Turnout		557,507	52.56	
Swing to IPF from INC		Swing		

=== 1984 ===
1984 Indian general election: Arrah
Party	Candidate	Votes	%	±%
INC	Baliram Bhagat	227,206	53.19	
LKD	Noor Ahmad	72,284	16.92	
JP	Chandra Deo Prasad Verma	45,479	10.65	
IND	Hardwar Singh	30,477	7.13	
IND	Ramashish Gupta	14,089	3.30	
IND	Gupteshwar Singh	10,811	2.53	
IND	Ram Shankar Pandey	5,338	1.25	
IND	Rajan Singh	4,353	1.02	
IND	18 Independent Candidates	17,149	4.02	
Majority		154,922	36.27	
Turnout		432,394	48.58	
Swing to INC from JP(S)		Swing		

=== 1980 ===
1980 Indian general election: Arrah
Party	Candidate	Votes	%	±%
JP(S)	Chandradeo Prasad Verma	158,533	38.43	
JP	Imamul Hai Khan	149,584	36.26	
INC(I)	Budhdeo Singh	74,659	18.10	
IND	Ram Subhag Singh	15,183	3.68	
RRP	Krishna Kumar Pandey	1,364	0.33	
IND	11 Independent Candidates	13,162	3.20	
Majority		8,949	2.17	
Turnout		417,138	50.29	
Swing to JP(S) from JP		Swing		

=== 1977 ===
1977 Indian general election: Arrah
Party	Candidate	Votes	%	±%
JP	Chandradeo Prasad Verma	323,913	70.67	
INC	Baliram Bhagat	113,036	24.66	
SUCI(C)	Rameshwar Upadhaya	5,822	1.27	
IND	7 Independent Candidates	15,569	3.39	
Majority		210,877	46.01	
Turnout		466,204	65.00	
JP win (new seat)				

== Social equation ==
The constituency was represented by only two parliamentarians till 1980. Bali Ram Bhagat, who hailed from Yadav caste and Chandradeo Prasad Verma, who was a member of Kushwaha (Koeri) caste were the parliamentarians, who had the distinction of getting elected from this seat for multiple times. After these two parliamentarians, the constituency elected different candidates everytime in next elections till 2009. This constituency is known for struggle between some caste groups for getting their men elected in Indian General Elections to Lok Sabha from the first General Elections itself.

Until 2004, only Yadav and Koeri candidates were elected in different elections, except in 1989, when Rameshwar Prasad, a member of Extremely Backward Caste was elected on the symbol of Indian People's Front. In 1996, 1998 and 1999 elections, Chandradeo Prasad Verma, Haridwar Prasad Singh and Ram Prasad Kushwaha, all three belonging to Koeri caste were elected from this constituency. From 2009 onwards, the candidates belonging to Rajput caste are getting elected.

== See also ==
- Bhojpur district
- List of constituencies of the Lok Sabha
- Arrah Junction Railway station
