= Sukhrauli =

- Village
- Location in Bihar, India Sukhrauli (India)
- Coordinates: 25.31896°N 84.37506°E
- Country: India
- State: Bihar
- District: Bhojpur

Area
  - Total: 1.65 km^{2} (0.64 sq mi)
- Elevation: 86 m (282 ft)

Population (2011)
  - Total: 1,766
  - Density: 1,070/km^{2} (2,770/sq mi)

Languages
  - Official: Bhojpuri, Hindi
- Time zone: UTC+5:30 (IST)

Sukhrauli is a village in Piro block of Bhojpur district, Bihar, India. It is located west of Piro. As of 2011, its population was 1,766, in 256 households.
