= Gogsand =

- Village
- Location in Bihar, India Gogsand (India)
- Coordinates: 25.3197°N 84.35186°E
- Country: India
- State: Bihar
- District: Bhojpur

Area
  - Total: 0.62 km^{2} (0.24 sq mi)
- Elevation: 83 m (272 ft)

Population (2011)
  - Total: 937
  - Density: 1,500/km^{2} (3,900/sq mi)

Languages
  - Official: Bhojpuri, Hindi
- Time zone: UTC+5:30 (IST)

Gogsand is a village in Piro block of Bhojpur district, Bihar, India. It is located west of Piro. As of 2011, its population was 937, in 149 households.
