= Deo Barunark =

Deo Barunark देवबरनार्क Deo
- Village
- Nickname: Deo Barunark
- Motto: Social welfare
- Location in Bhojpur, India
- Coordinates: 25.2499245°N 84.4594948°E
- Country: India
- State: Bihar
- District: Bhojpur
- HQ: Arrah
- Block: Tarari
- Panchayat: Deo

Government
  - literacy: 71.02%
  - Languages: Bhojpuri, Hindi

Population (2011)
  - Total: 4,398
- Time zone: UTC+5:30 (IST)
- PIN code: 802209
- Website: https://www.facebook.com/देव-वरूणार्क-1388108201515480/

Deo Barunark or Deo (देवबरनार्क) is a village and historical site located in the Tarari block of Bhojpur district, Bihar, India. Situated almost 27 miles south-west of Arrah, the village is known for its ancient temples and pillars dating to the Later Gupta period. While local traditions may extend its history further, its most significant archaeological remains are from this era.

== History ==
An inscription was found here in the 19th century dating to the time of Jivitagupta II. This is a valuable source of information for the later Guptas, naming king Jivitagupta as the son of Vishnugupta and his queen Ijjadevi. There is an ancient Sun temple in the village which received land grants from the Gupta and Maukhari rulers. The location was photographed by Henry Baily Wade Garrick in 1881–82.

== Temples and Archaeological Remains ==
The site at Deo Barunark contains two ancient temples and several pillars from the Gupta period.

=== The Brick Temples ===
Both temples at the site are built of brick with very little ornamentation and, while in fair preservation, have lost their original spires.

- The Main Temple: The larger of the two temples was originally dedicated to the Sun God (Sūrya). It now contains a central image of Vishnu, which is flanked by two smaller statues of the sun-god. In front of this temple stand four pillars carved in the Gupta style. One of these pillars bears the 740 A.D. inscription of Jīvita Gupta.
- The Second Temple: This temple belongs to the same period and contains an old pedestal that once held a statue of Sūrya.

=== The Pillar of the Guardian Deities ===
Standing close to the temples is another pillar, also from the Gupta period. Its square capital is carved with figures on its four sides representing Indra (East), Yama (South), Baruna (West), and Kubera (North), the presiding deities of the cardinal directions. Around the pillar's circular shaft are eight indistinct figures which are believed to be representations of the planets (Navagraha), as the figure of Rāhu is recognizable among them.

== Administration ==
Deo village is administrated by Mukhiya through its Gram Panchayat, who is elected representative of village as per constitution of India and Panchyati Raj Act.

Particulars	Total	Male	Female
Total No. of Houses	735		
Population	4398	2268	2130
