= R. K. Singh =

Indian politician

Raj Kumar Singh
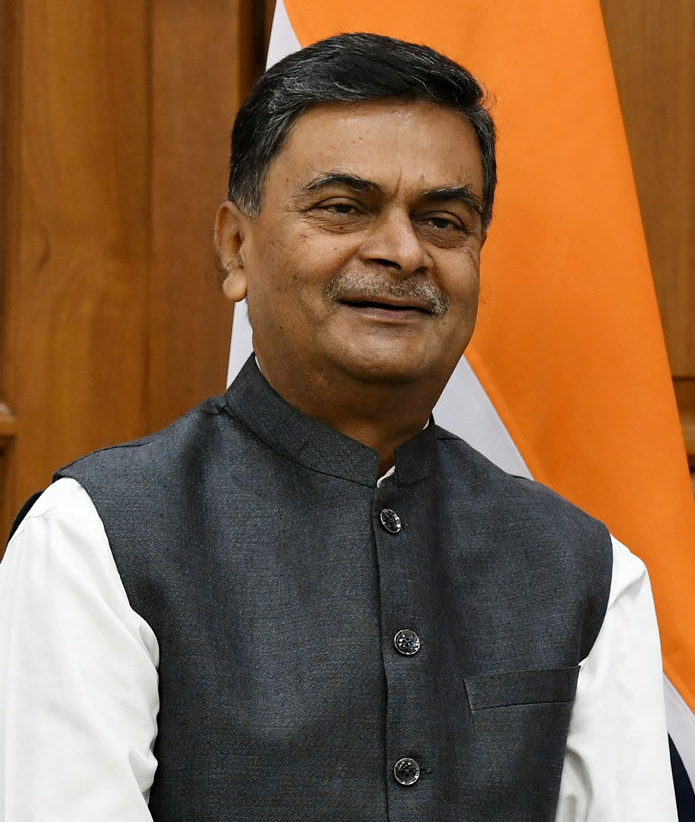

Minister of Power and Minister of New and Renewable Energy
- In office 3 September 2017 – 11 June 2024
- Prime Minister: Narendra Modi
- Preceded by: Piyush Goyal
- Succeeded by: Manohar Lal Khattar

Minister of State for Skill Development and Entrepreneurship
- In office 31 May 2019 – 7 July 2021
- Prime Minister: Narendra Modi
- Preceded by: Anantkumar Hegde
- Succeeded by: Rajeev Chandrasekhar

Member of Parliament in Lok Sabha
- In office 16 May 2014 – 4 June 2024
- Prime Minister: Narendra Modi
- Preceded by: Meena Singh
- Succeeded by: Sudama Prasad
- Constituency: Arrah

Home Secretary of India
- In office 30 June 2011 – 30 June 2013
- Prime Minister: Manmohan Singh
- Preceded by: G.K. Pillai
- Succeeded by: Anil Goswami

Personal details
- Born: 20 December 1952 (age 73) Supaul, Bihar, India
- Party: Bharatiya Janata Party (2013-2025)
- Spouse: Sheila Singh (m. 1975)
- Children: 2
- Education: St. Stephen's College, Delhi (BA); Delhi University; Magadh University (LLB); Delft University of Technology, Netherlands

Raj Kumar Singh (born 20 December 1952) is an Indian politician and former civil servant. He joined the Indian Police Service in the year 1974 and later the Indian Administrative Service in 1975. He served as the Home Secretary of India from 2011 to 2013. He was the Member of the Indian Parliament for Arrah, Bihar from May 2014 to 4 June 2024.

On 3 September 2017, he was appointed as the Minister of Power (Independent Charge) in Prime Minister Narendra Modi's cabinet.^{2]} On 30 May 2019, he was appointed Minister of State (Independent Charge) of the Ministry of Power, Minister of State (Independent Charge) of the Ministry of New and Renewable Energy and Minister of State in the Ministry of Skill Development and Entrepreneurship, Government of India.

On 7 July 2021, he was elevated to the rank of Cabinet minister.

== Early life and education ==
Shri R.K. Singh was born in Supaul, Bihar. His father was an officer in the Army. R.K. Singh was educated at St. Michael's High School, Patna, and St. Stephen's College, Delhi. After graduating with an Honours degree in English Literature in 1973, he appeared for and got into the IPS in 1974, and thereafter into the Indian Administrative Service in 1975. He was allotted the Bihar cadre.

== Career in the IAS ==
Shri Singh started his career as SDO in Jamui Subdivision of Munger, where he was known as an upright and fearless officer. He was posted as ADM (Law and Order), Dhanbad, and thereafter as Director (admin), Department of Agriculture. From 1981 to 1983, he was District Magistrate of East Champaran, where his reputation as a strict and honest officer grew. He was known as someone who could not be influenced by anybody.

When law and order deteriorated in Patna he was posted as District Magistrate, Patna in 1983 he improved the law and order, widened the roads and cleaned up the town. As District Magistrate, Patna, He controlled the anti-Sikh riots, which broke out after the assassination of Prime Minister Indira Gandhi, promptly and effectively within three days. He was transferred in 1985 after he detained a sitting minister for interfering in the elections. He was thereafter posted as CMD of the Bihar State Leather Industry Development Corporation, which he reorganised. He then went to the Netherlands to do a diploma in Management. When he came back, he was posted as MD of the North Bihar Industrial Area Development Authority. In april 1987 when some escapes took place from prisons and security needed strengthening, he was posted as Inspector General of Prisons, Bihar. He strengthened the prison administration. In 1987 when he found that the minister for prisons was passing transfer orders after taking bribes. He wrote about this to the Chief Secretary and stated that he was not willing to work under the said minister and he may be transferred. He was transferred.

When Bhagwat Jha Azad became Chief Minister, he decided to crack down on the rampant corruption in cooperatives. He suspended the three apex cooperative organizations—the Cooperative Marketing Federation (BISCOMAUN), which had the monopoly in fertilisers, seeds and other agricultural products distribution; the State Cooperative Bank, which provided agric edit to farmers; and the Land Development Bank, which provided loans to farmers for tractors, etc.—and appointed IAS officer’s as Administrator.

Shri R.K. Singh was appointed Administrator of BISCOMAUN. He took action against those involved in the corruption, including the then Chairman, Tapeshwar Singh, He stream lined the fertiliser and seed distribution for farmers so efficiently that the Cabinet passed a resolution commending him.

In April 1990 he was posted next as Registrar of Cooperative Societies, the regulator for all cooperative bodies in the State. In October 1990, Shri L.K. Advani started a Rath Yatra throughout the country to mobilise the people for the construction of the Ram Temple at Ayodhya. When the yatra was passing through Bihar in its last leg before entering Uttar Pradesh, the State Government, decided that the Rath Yatra be stopped as it might lead to riots. The districts through which the Rath Yatra passed were directed to stop the yatra and arrest Shri Advani, but they could not do so because of the huge crowds which used to gather. The State Government decided that only one officer was capable of doing this—Shri R.K. Singh. He was called by the Chief Secretary and informed that the Government had decided to entrust him with this task, as he was deemed to be the only officer capable of doing it. He was asked to draw up a plan, and the State Government would provide him with the necessary resources. Shri R.K. Singh stopped the yatra and arrested Shri L.K. Advani.

In 1991 he was posted as Director in the 6 Branch of Ministry of Defence – which looks after operations and intelligence. He was part of the delegation of India for talks with Pakistan on the Siachen issue. After completion of his tenure he did a course in the National Defence College.

He was appointed Home Secretary of Bihar in December 1997 after an incident in which some upper caste people killed dalits and the state came under severe criticism. He was transferred out in 1999 after differences with the then Chief Minister Smt. Rabri Devi/Shri Lalu Prasad.

Shri RK Singh was posted as Joint Secretary in the Ministry of Home Affairs in the year 2000. He was given charge of the exercise to create three new states of Uttarakhand, Jharkhand and Chattisgarh after that he was given charge of the newly created desk of Disaster Management mechanism in the country. He drafted the Disaster Management Act. He created the National Disaster Management Authority. He formed the National Disaster Response Force.

When he returned to the State in 2005, Shri Nitish Kumar appointed him as Principal Secretary, Road Construction Department. Shri R.K. Singh revamped the condition of roads in the State. He increased the length of State Highways from 1,100 km to 2,000 km. All the State Highways were intermediate-lane roads when Shri Singh took over. He expanded the entire 2,000 km network into two-lane highways. The major district roads about 9000 kms in length were all expanded from single-lane to intermediate-lane. He rewrote the PWD Code. He changed the entire system to enable rapid and professional execution of projects.

Defence Minister A.K. Antony picked him to serve as Secretary, Defence Production in 2009. He speeded up all the ongoing defence projects. In 2011 he was picked as Union Home Secretary. It was during his tenure that Mumbai attack terrorist Ajmal Kasab and Parliament attack convict Afzal Guru were hanged.

Shri Singh had differences with the then Home Minister, Shinde in 2012 because Shinde wanted the then Commissioner of Police, Delhi, to be changed after the Nirbhaya case, whereas the Home Secretary felt that the Commissioner of Police was not at fault and should not be shunted out, Mr. RK Singh retired as Union Home Secretary in July 2013 – after 39 years of service – from 1974 to 2013.

== Political career ==
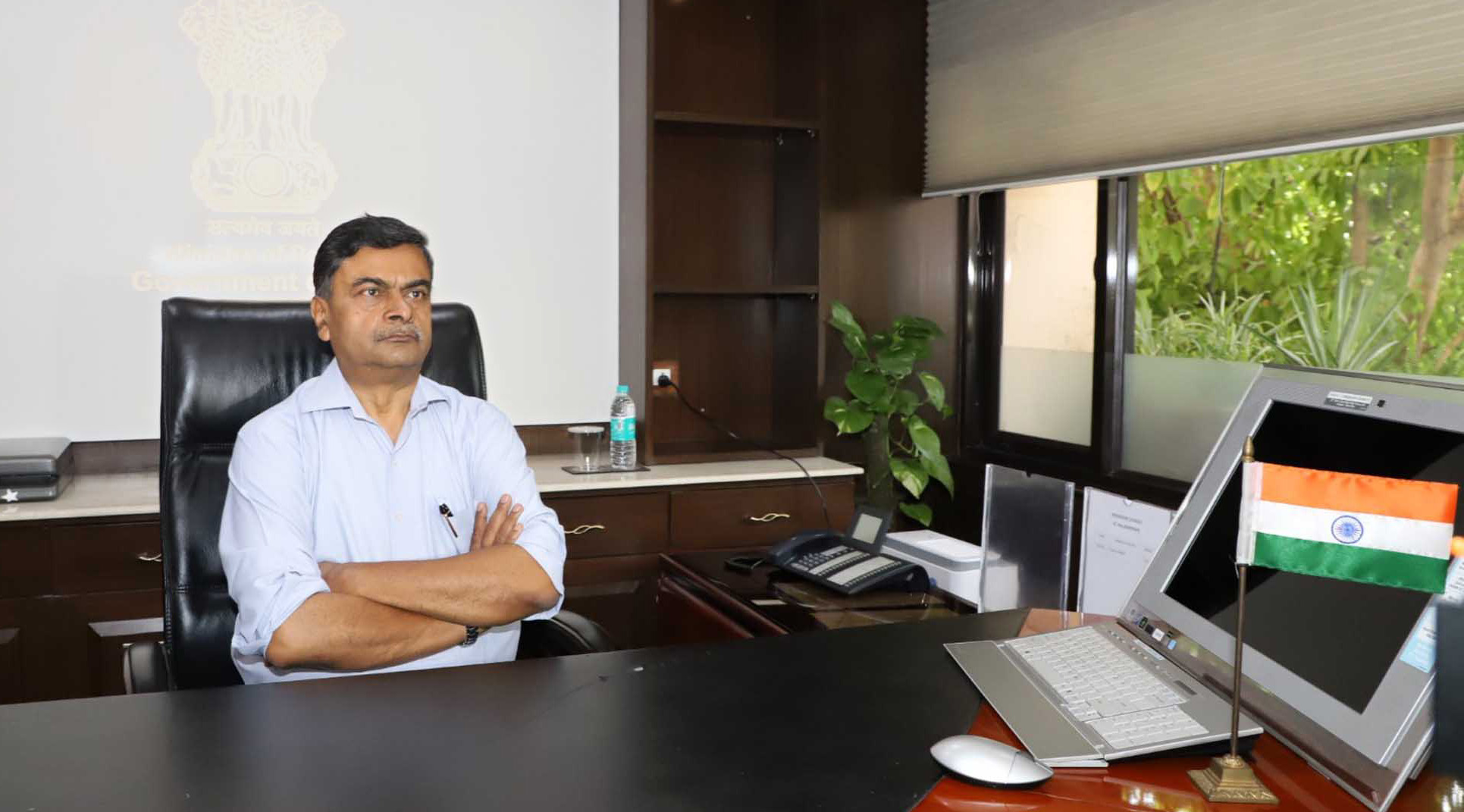
Singh taking charge as the Minister of State (Independent Charge) for Power, in New Delhi on 31 May 2019.

There was speculation that Singh would contest from the Bihar constituencies of either Arrah or Supaul in the 2014 Lok Sabha polls, though Rashtriya Swayamsevak Sangh objected to him contesting from Supaul. On 13 December 2013, Singh joined the BJP. He contested the election as a BJP candidate in Arrah, beating his nearest rival, Sribhagwan Singh Kushwaha of RJD by a margin of over 1,35,000 votes.

In the 2019 General Elections conducted for the formation of the 17th Lok Sabha, he again contested from Arrah and retained his seat becoming the first MP from Arrah since Chandradeo Prasad Verma to retain his seat in successive elections. He defeated his nearest rival Raju Yadav of CPI (ML) Liberation by 1,47,285 votes.

On 3 September 2017, Mr. Singh was appointed Minister of Power (Independent Charge) and Minister of New and Renewable Energy (Independent Charge) by Narendra Modi. This post was previously held by Piyush Goyal.

In May 2019, Singh was appointed Minister of State (Independent Charge) for Power and New and Renewable Energy and Minister of State for Skill Development and Entrepreneurship.

In the 2024 Indian general election he lost his MP seat from Arrah, Bihar to Communist Party of India (Marxist–Leninist) Liberation candidate Sudama Prasad by the margin of 59808 votes.

In September 2025, Singh claimed that his 2024 loss was due to a conspiracy by several BJP and JD(U) leaders, stating that the BJP had ignored his concerns about independent candidate Pawan Singh contesting against him and that several sitting MLAs and MLCs from the two parties had campaigned against him. Later that month, he again came into conflict with the party leadership after asking Bihar deputy chief minister Samrat Choudhary (BJP) to either step down or respond to allegations made by Jan Suraaj party leader Prashant Kishor that Choudhary had lied about his age to avoid prosecution in a 1995 murder case and had also misrepresented his educational qualifications on election affidavits.

In November 2025, days before the 2025 Bihar Legislative Assembly election, Singh accused the National Democratic Alliance-led Bihar government of purchasing electricity from Adani Power Limited at inflated prices, estimating that the markup would cost the state ₹62,000 crore over the span of 25 years. On 15 November, Singh resigned from the BJP after being suspended for anti-party activities, stating that he could not defend himself because no specific offence had been cited and that he believed he was being targeted for suggesting the party avoid giving tickets to members with criminal backgrounds.

== Personal life ==
He married Sheila Singh on 27 February 1975. They have a son and a daughter together.

Lok Sabha
Preceded by Meena Singh	Member of Parliament for Arrah; 2014 – Present	Succeeded by Incumbent
Political offices
Preceded by Piyush Goyal (Minister of State with Independent charge)	Minister of Power (Minister of State with Independent charge until 7 July 2021); 3 September 2017 – Present	Incumbent
Preceded by Piyush Goyal (Minister of State with Independent charge)	Minister of New and Renewable Energy (Minister of State with Independent charge until 7 July 2021); 3 September 2017 – Present	Incumbent
