= Ram Awadhesh Singh =

Indian politician (1937–2020)

Member of National Commission for Backward Classes
- In office 2007–2010

Member of parliament, Rajya Sabha
- In office 1986–1992

Member of Bikramganj (Lok Sabha constituency)
- In office 1977–1979
- Preceded by: Shiopujan Shastri
- Succeeded by: Tapeshwar Singh

Member of Bihar Legislative Assembly
- In office 1969–1971
- Constituency: Bikramganj

Personal details
- Born: 18 June 1937 (age 88) Rohtas, Bihar
- Died: 20 July 2020 (aged 83) Patna
- Party: Bharatiya Lok Dal
- Children: 4 sons and 1 daughter

Ram Awadhesh Singh Yadav (18 June 1937 – 20 July 2020) was an Indian politician, and a renowned Social Justice Leader of India.

He served as a Member of the Lok Sabha (1977–1979), and in the Rajya Sabha (1986–1992). He was a well-known socialist leader and a strong follower of Dr. Ram Manohar Lohia. His long struggle led to the formation of well-known "Mandal Commission", i.e. he is also known as "God-Father of Mandal Commission". He is also known as "Periar of the North". He was Nominated as Member, National Commission for Backward Classes (June 2007).

He died in 2020 from COVID-19.
