= Haridwar Prasad Singh =

Former Indian parliamentarian

Member of Parliament, Lok Sabha
- In office 1998–1999
- Constituency: Arrah Lok Sabha constituency, Bihar

Personal details
- Party: Samata Party

Haridwar Prasad Singh (also known as H.P Singh) was an Indian politician based in Bihar, who was elected to Indian Parliament (Lok Sabha) from Arrah Lok Sabha constituency. He was elected to 12th Lok Sabha and he defeated Chandradeo Prasad Verma of Rashtriya Janata Dal to become a parliamentarian. Singh was a member of Samata Party while he was elected to Lok Sahha.

== Life ==
Singh was born on 27 September 1947 to L.P Singh in Bhojpur district of Bihar. He was educated till matriculation and married at an early age to B. Devi. In early part of his life, he worked as an agriculturist and trade union leader. His political career got a boost when he was elected to 12th Lok Sabha in 1998 Indian General Elections. In his role as a parliamentarian, he became a member of Committee on Public Undertakings and Committee on Human Resource Development. He also remained a member of consultative committee on food and consumer affairs.

Singh was also engaged in numerous socio-cultural activities. He worked for upliftment of downtrodden and also worked for people affected by natural disasters. Singh also worked for environmental conservation.

Singh was a vice president of Paradeep port labour union and General Secretary of Food Corporation of India workers' union. He was also a member of minerals and Metals Trading Corporation Workers' Union. For the upliftment of downtrodden, he founded Bharatiya Samajik Utthan Sansthan. He was also known for his initiative in the sector of education and was one of the members of Ghanshyam Hemlata Vidya Mandir Society. Besides these, he was also associated with Minimum Wages Advisory Committee and Zonal Railway Users Consultative Committee of the Eastern Railway.

== Commemoration ==
Singh was commemorated in 2013, for his role in labour movement. The commemoration ceremony was held in a cultural program organised to mourn his death which ended his years long role in upliftment of labourers by ensuring humane working condition and living wage. This ceremony was hosted by Arrah district unit of Akhil Bhartiya Kushwaha Mahasabha.
