= Tilath =

Tilath Tilāth
- Village
- Location in Bihar, India Tilath (India)
- Coordinates: 25.34939°N 84.41673°E
- Country: India
- State: Bihar
- District: Bhojpur

Area
  - Total: 2.95 km^{2} (1.14 sq mi)
- Elevation: 82 m (269 ft)

Population (2011)
  - Total: 2,886
  - Density: 978/km^{2} (2,530/sq mi)

Languages
  - Official: Bhojpuri, Hindi
- Time zone: UTC+5:30 (IST)

Tilath, is a bhumihar of village

in Piro block of Bhojpur district, Bihar, India. It is located northeast of Piro. As of 2011, its population was 2,886, in 500 households.
