= Ram Ekbal Singh Warsi =

Indian politician

- राम इकबाल सिंह वारसी
- Born: 1922
- Died: 10 October 2016 (aged 93–94)
- Occupations: Freedom Fighter and Politician

Ram Ekbal Singh Warsi (c. 1922 – 10 October 2016), also spelled Ram Iqbal Worsi, was an Indian freedom fighter, social thinker from Bhojpur, Bihar. Warsi was the name of his native village, which he added to his last name.

== Biography ==
Ram Eqbal worked in Rohtas Group of Industries as a manual worker, and became an activist for Indian Independence in 1938. In 1942, he participated in the Quit India Movement and was imprisoned, where he met socialist leaders Jayaprakash Narayan and Ram Manohar Lohia. He joined Subash Chandra Bose's Indian National Army in 1943.

Socialist leader Ram Manohar Lohia had named Warsi as Gandhi of Piro (Piro ke Gandhi) in 1956, for his strong socialist views.

He was elected an MLA from Piro (now named Tarari) constituency on a ticket from Samyukta Socialist Party in 1969. He represented the constituency in Bihar Legislative Assembly till 1972.

He left politics in 1972, but continued speaking for the marginalized and the poor.

He didn't contest elections after 1969, finding the political system dishonest.

He refused to accept the pension he was sanctioned, as an MLA or as a freedom fighter. He said: “Accepting pension for trying to liberate one’s home is a sin. And taking pension for serving people, as their elected representative, is a bigger sin,” Warsi lived his last few years in a run-down home in Rohtas, refused offers to contest more elections. His family had difficulty in making ends meet.

== Family ==
Ram Ekbal Singh Warsi was born into a respected Ahir (Yadav) family in Bhojpur district of Bihar. His father was Kishun Dayal Singh, and his grandfather was Babu Charitar Singh. He had a brother named Ramayan Singh. Warsi had two children — a son, Dr. Sheojee Singh, and a daughter, Sushila Devi. His grandchildren include Anurag Raj Shivam and Akanksha Shivam. His daughter-in-law, Chaudhary Mayawati, has also been active in politics and has served as a member of the Bihar State Women Commission.

Among his extended family, one of his brother's daughters, Sumitra Kumari, earned recognition in the region. She served as an Advocate at the High Court and was also a member of the Bihar State Women Commission. She died in a road accident during an election period.

== Death ==
Warsi died in Indira Gandhi Institute of Medical Science (IGIMS), Patna at the age of 94 years on 10 October 2016.

Bihar Chief Minister Nitish Kumar, in his tribute said Warsi's "contribution in promoting socialist movement in Bihar would never be forgotten."
