= Lohrabad =

Lohrabad Lohrābād
- Village
- Location in Bihar, India Lohrabad (India)
- Coordinates: 25.32633°N 84.38595°E
- Country: India
- State: Bihar
- District: Bhojpur

Area
  - Total: 0.29 km^{2} (0.11 sq mi)
- Elevation: 85 m (279 ft)

Population (2011)
  - Total: 1,601
  - Density: 5,500/km^{2} (14,000/sq mi)

Languages
  - Official: Bhojpuri, Hindi
- Time zone: UTC+5:30 (IST)

Lohrabad is a village in Piro block of Bhojpur district, Bihar, India. It is located a short distance west of Piro. As of 2011, its population was 1,601, in 197 households.
