= Bachri, Piro =

Bachri
- Village
- Location in Bihar, India Bachri (India)
- Coordinates: 25.30831°N 84.39849°E
- Country: India
- State: Bihar
- District: Bhojpur

Area
  - Total: 2.57 km^{2} (0.99 sq mi)
- Elevation: 85 m (279 ft)

Population (2011)
  - Total: 3,476
  - Density: 1,350/km^{2} (3,500/sq mi)

Languages
  - Official: Bhojpuri, Hindi
- Time zone: UTC+5:30 (IST)

Bachri is a village in Piro block of the Bhojpur district, Bihar, India. It is located south of Piro. As of 2011, its population was 3,476, in 583 households. Bachari village is also known for its association with Shaheed Jagdish Prasad, a young freedom fighter of the Quit India Movement (1942). Jagdish Prasad, born in August 1933, was a resident of Bachari village (then in Shahabad district, Bihar) and the son of Nanho Prasad. As a student of Sasaram High School, he actively participated in student strikes and nationalist protests inspired by Mahatma Gandhi’s call of “Do or Die”. While participating in a procession carrying the Indian national flag towards Sasaram Dharamshala, British colonial police opened fire on the demonstrators. He was seriously injured in the police firing in August 1942 and later succumbed to his injuries on 20 September 1942. He is remembered as a martyr of India’s freedom struggle, and his family continues to reside in Bachari village.

A memorial (Samrak) dedicated to Shaheed Jagdish Prasad has been constructed near Sasaram Railway Station in his honor. In Bachari village, a school named Shaheed Jagdish Sishu Vidyalaya, Bachari, was established in his memory and formally started on 2 January 1985.

From time to time, memorial programs and commemorative events are organized in remembrance of Shaheed Jagdish Prasad. Several prominent political and public figures have attended these events, including Nitin Navin (BJP leader and president), Rituraj Kishor Sinha, R. K. Sinha, and Punit Singh (RJD leader and MLC candidate), reflecting his continued legacy in the region.
