= Deochanda =

- Village
- Location in Bihar, India Deochanda (India)
- Coordinates: 25.35042°N 84.39757°E
- Country: India
- State: Bihar
- District: Bhojpur

Area
  - Total: 1.69 km^{2} (0.65 sq mi)
- Elevation: 81 m (266 ft)

Population (2011)
  - Total: 1,170
  - Density: 692/km^{2} (1,790/sq mi)

Languages
  - Official: Bhojpuri, Hindi
- Time zone: UTC+5:30 (IST)

Deochanda is a village in Piro block of Bhojpur district, Bihar, India. It is located north of Piro. As of 2011, its population was 1,170, in 189 households.
