= Ajit Kumar Singh =

Indian politician (1962–2007)

MP
- In office 2004–2007
- Preceded by: Kanti Singh
- Succeeded by: Meena Singh
- Constituency: Bikramganj

Personal details
- Born: 10 February 1962 Bhojpur, Bihar, India
- Died: 1 August 2007 (aged 45) Siwan
- Party: JD(U)
- As of 26 September, 2006 Source: []

Ajit Kumar Singh (10 February 1962 – 1 August 2007) was an Indian politician who was a member of the 14th Lok Sabha. He represented the Bikramganj constituency of Bihar and was a member of the Janata Dal (United) (JD(U)) political party. He died in a car accident on 1 August 2007, aged 45.
