= Ram Subhag Singh =

Indian politician

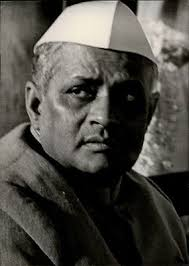
- Ram Subhag Singh in 1967

Minister of State for Food and Agriculture
- In office 08 May 1962 - 8 June 1964
- Prime Minister: Jawahar Lal Nehru
- Constituency: Bikramganj

Minister of State for Railways
- In office 14 June 1964 - 12 March 1967
- Prime Minister: Lal Bahadur Shastri
- Constituency: Bikramganj

Minister of Social Security and Cottage Industries
- In office 09 June 1964 - 13 June 1964
- Prime Minister: Lal Bahadur Shastri
- Preceded by: Nityanand Kanungo
- Succeeded by: H.C. Dasappa
- Constituency: Bikramganj

Minister of Parliamentary Affairs
- In office 13 March 1967 - 14 February 1969
- Prime Minister: Indira Gandhi
- Preceded by: Satya Narayan Sinha
- Succeeded by: Kotha Raghuramaiah
- Constituency: Buxar

Minister of Communications and Information Technology
- In office 13 March 1967 - 14 February 1969
- Prime Minister: Indira Gandhi
- Preceded by: Satya Narayan Sinha
- Succeeded by: Satya Narayan Sinha
- Constituency: Buxar

Minister of Railways
- In office 14 February 1969 - 4 November 1969
- Prime Minister: Indira Gandhi
- Preceded by: C. M. Poonacha
- Succeeded by: Panampilli Govinda Menon
- Constituency: Buxar

Leader of the Opposition in Lok Sabha
- In office 17 December 1969 - 27 December 1970
- Preceded by: Position established
- Succeeded by: Yashwantrao Chavan
- Constituency: Buxar

Personal details
- Born: Ram Subhag Singh; 7 July 1917 Khajuria, Dhamar Post, Bhojpur district, Bihar and Orissa Province, British India (present-day Bihar, India)
- Died: 16 December 1980 (aged 63) New Delhi, Delhi, India
- Cause of death: Heart Attack
- Resting place: Nigam Bodh Ghat, New Delhi, Delhi, India
- Citizenship: Indian
- Party: Indian National Congress (Organisation) (from 1969)
- Other political affiliations: Indian National Congress
- Education: Town School, Arrah, Mahatma Gandhi Kashi Vidyapith and Varanasi
- Alma mater: University of Missouri
- Occupation: Freedom Fighter, Politician

Ram Subhag Singh (7 July 1917 – 16 December 1980) was an Indian politician who was a member of the Indian National Congress. He served as a member of the 3rd and 4th Lok Sabha for Bikramganj and Buxar in the Bihar state of India in 1962 and 1967, respectively. After the split in the Congress party in 1969, he stayed with the Indian National Congress (Organisation). He was first leader of the opposition in the Lok Sabha in 1969. He participated in the Indian independence movement. He was a cabinet minister in the Union Government led by the Congress party.

== Early life ==
Singh was born on July 1917 in Lohtamia Bihari Rajput family in Bhojpur district of the Bihar in India. He undertook his primary education at the Government Town School, Ara Bihar, and his secondary education at Kashi Vidyapeeth, Varanasi, Uttar Pradesh. Singh went to the University of Missouri for completing his Ph.D. degree in journalism from the Missouri School of Journalism.

== Activism and politics ==
He participated in 1942 Quit India Movement along with Mahatma Gandhi. He was close aide of Jawahar Lal Nehru and he fought Parliamentary Election in 1952 from Sasaram Constituency of Bihar State and elected as Member of Parliament in First Loksabha. In 1957 he again got elected to Parliament from same constituency. In 1962 he won parliamentary seat of Bikramganj constituency in Bihar. In 1967 he fought the general election for the Buxar constituency and was elected to parliament for a 4th time.

== Policy initiatives and achievements ==
During his tenure as Minister of Railways from February to November 1969, Ram Subhag Singh proposed and initiated the Rajdhani Express service, India's first high-speed, fully air-conditioned premium train aimed at connecting the national capital to major cities like Kolkata. On February 19, 1969, Singh announced the introduction of the Rajdhani in his railway budget speech, emphasizing faster travel with onboard catering and reduced journey times. The inaugural Howrah Rajdhani Express departed from New Delhi on March 1, 1969, covering the 1,451 km distance to Howrah in approximately 17 hours at an average speed of 85 km/h, marking a significant upgrade in long-distance rail efficiency.

This initiative laid the foundation for subsequent Rajdhani expansions, prioritizing air-conditioned coaches, priority scheduling, and integrated services to enhance passenger comfort and national connectivity, though implementation faced logistical challenges like track upgrades. Earlier, as Minister of State for Food and Agriculture from May 1962 to June 1964, Singh contributed to parliamentary discussions on agricultural expansion, including afforestation targets that achieved 87,072 acres planted in 1961-62 with plans for 101,646 acres the following year, supporting broader food security efforts amid India's post-independence planning. His roles underscored a focus on infrastructural and productive sector reforms, though specific quantifiable outcomes beyond these announcements remain tied to collective governmental efforts.

== Positions held ==
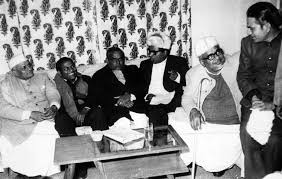
Opposition leaders (From right to left) Madhu Limaye, Raj Narayan, George Fernandes, Atal Bihari Vajpayee, Ram Subhag Singh.

- Member of the Central Legislature for over 22 years consecutively.
- Member of Parliament, 1948–1952.
- Provisional Parliament, 1950–1952.
- Member of Parliament, 1952–1957.
- Agriculturist and Journalist; President, Shahabad District Canal (Nahar) Kisan Congress, 1952–1955.
- Member of Parliament, 1957–1962.
- Secretary, Congress party in Parliament, 1955–1962.
- Union Minister of State for Food and Agriculture, 1962–1964.
- Union Minister of Social Security & Cottage Industries, 9 June 1964 – 13 June 1964.
- Union Minister of State for Railways, 1964–1967.
- Union Minister of Parliamentary Affairs, 1967–1969.
- Union Minister of Communications and Information Technology, 1967–1969.
- Union Minister of Railways, 14 February 1969 – 4 November 1969.
- He was India's first Leader of Opposition in the Lok Sabha from 1969–1970.
