= Ram Prasad Kushwaha =

Indian politician

Ram Prasad Singh

Member of Parliament, Lok Sabha
- In office 1999–2004
- Preceded by: H. P. Singh
- Succeeded by: Kanti Singh
- Constituency: Arrah, Bihar
- In office 1989–1996
- Preceded by: Tapeshwar Singh
- Succeeded by: Kanti Singh
- Constituency: Bikramganj, Bihar

Personal details
- Born: 3 March 1941 Kochas, Rohtas, Bihar, British India
- Party: Rashtriya Janata Dal
- Other political affiliations: Janata Dal
- Spouse: Munishwari Devi

Ram Prasad Singh commonly known as Ram Prasad Kushwaha is an Indian politician. He was elected to the Lok Sabha, the lower house of the Parliament of India from Bikramganj constituency in 1989 and 1991 as a member of the Janata Dal and from Arrah constituency of Bihar in 1999 as a member of the Rashtriya Janata Dal.

== Life ==
Born to Shri Jagdeo Singh on 3 March 1941, Singh grew up to become an agriculturist and social worker.
