= Bikramganj Lok Sabha constituency =

Former Lok Sabha constituency in Bihar

Coordinates: 25.2°N 84.3°E

Bikramganj
- Former Lok Sabha constituency

Constituency details
- Country: India
- Region: East India
- State: Bihar
- Established: 1962
- Abolished: 2008

Bikramganj was a Lok Sabha constituency in Bihar state in eastern India. It was abolished in 2008.

== Assembly segments ==
Bikramganj Lok Sabha constituency comprised the following six Vidhan Sabha (legislative assembly) segments:

1. Piro
2. Karakat
3. Bikramganj
4. Dinara
5. Nokha
6. Dehri

== Members of Parliament ==
=== 1962-2008 ===
Bikramganj Lok Sabha constituency was created in 1962 and abolished in 2008. Following is the list of the Members of Parliament, who represented Bikramganj constituency:

- 1962: Ram Subhag Singh, Indian National Congress
- 1967: Shiopujan Shastri, Indian National Congress
- 1971: Shiopujan Shastri, Indian National Congress
- 1977: Ram Awadhesh Singh, Janata Party
- 1980: Tapeshwar Singh, Indian National Congress (Indira)
- 1984: Tapeshwar Singh, Indian National Congress
- 1989: Ram Prasad Singh, Janata Dal
- 1991: Ram Prasad Singh, Janata Dal
- 1996: Kanti Singh, Janata Dal
- 1998: Bashistha Narain Singh, Samata Party
- 1999: Kanti Singh, Rashtriya Janata Dal
- 2004: Ajit Kumar Singh, Janata Dal (United)
- 2008 onwards:Constituency does not exist

== See also ==
- Rohtas district
- List of constituencies of the Lok Sabha
