= Chandradip Singh =

Indian politician

Member of Bihar Legislative Assembly
- In office 1995–2000
- Constituency: Piro constituency

Personal details
- Party: Communist Party of India (Marxist–Leninist) Liberation
- Committees: Indian People's Front

Chandradip Singh also known as Chandradeep Singh or Chander Deep Singh is an Indian politician and former member of the Bihar Legislative Assembly. He is a member of the Communist Party of India (Marxist–Leninist) Liberation. He had represented the Piro constituency from 1990 to 1995 as a member of the Indian People's Front, a mass front of the Communist Party of India (Marxist–Leninist) Liberation.
