= Vishal Prashant =

Indian politician

Member of Bihar Legislative Assembly
- Incumbent
- Assumed office 23 November 2024
- Preceded by: Sudama Prasad
- Constituency: Tarari

Personal details
- Party: Bharatiya Janata Party
- Parent: Sunil Pandey
- Profession: Politician

Vishal Prashant is an Indian politician from Bihar. He is a member of the Bihar Legislative Assembly since 2024, representing Tarari Assembly constituency as a member of the Bharatiya Janata Party.

== See also ==
- List of chief ministers of Bihar
- Bihar Legislative Assembly
