= Tarari Assembly constituency =

Assembly constituency in Bihar, India

- Constituency No. 196 for the Bihar Legislative Assembly

Constituency details
- Country: India
- Region: East India
- State: Bihar
- District: Bhojpur
- Established: 1951 (as Tarari cum Piro); 1957 (renamed to Piro); 2010 (renamed to Tarari)
- Total electors: 304,027
- Reservation: None

Member of Legislative Assembly
- 18th Bihar Legislative Assembly
- Incumbent Vishal Prashant
- Party: BJP
- Alliance: NDA
- Elected year: 2025

Tarari Assembly constituency (formerly Piro Assembly constituency) is one of 243 constituencies of legislative assembly of Bihar. It is part of Arrah Lok Sabha constituency along with other assembly constituencies viz. Sandesh, Barhara, Arrah, Agiaon (SC), Jagdishpur and Shahpur.

== Area/Wards ==
Tarari assembly constituency consists of:

- Tarari CD block
- Sahar CD block
- Gram Panchayats: Amai, Bachari, Bharsar, Nonar, Katar, Narayanpur, Sukhrauli and Piro (Nagar Panchayat) of Piro CD block.

== Members of the Legislative Assembly ==
The list of the Members of the Legislative Assembly (MLA) representing Tarari constituency is as follows:

Year	Member	Party
1952-2008: See Piro Assembly constituency
2010	Narendra Kumar Pandey	Janata Dal (United)
2015	Sudama Prasad	Communist Party of India (Marxist–Leninist) Liberation
2020	Sudama Prasad	Communist Party of India (Marxist–Leninist) Liberation
2024^	Vishal Prashant	Bharatiya Janata Party
2025	Vishal Prashant	Bharatiya Janata Party

^By-poll

== Election results ==
=== 2025 ===
Bihar Legislative Assembly Election, 2025: Tarari
Party	Candidate	Votes	%	±%
BJP	Vishal Prashant	96,887	49.59	+41.45
CPI(ML)L	Madan Singh	85,423	43.72	+0.19
Independent	Rajendra Pathak	2,364	1.21	
JSP	Chandra Shekhar	2,271	1.16	
NOTA	None of the above	4,078	2.09	+0.59
Majority		11,464	5.87	−0.61
Turnout		195,382	64.26	+8.63
BJP hold		Swing		

=== 2024 bypoll ===
Bihar Legislative Assembly by-election 2024: Tarari
Party	Candidate	Votes	%	±%
BJP	Vishal Prashant	78,755	48.70	
CPI(ML)L	Raju Yadav	68,143	42.14	
NOTA	None of the Above	3,560	2.20	
Majority		10,612	6.56	
Turnout		1,61,170		
BJP gain from CPI(ML)L		Swing		

=== 2020 ===
2020 Bihar Legislative Assembly election: Tarari
Party	Candidate	Votes	%	±%
CPI(ML)L	Sudama Prasad	73,945	43.53	
Independent	Narendra Kumar Pandey @ Sunil Pandey	62,930	37.05	
BJP	Kaushal Kumar Vidhyarthi	13,833	8.14	
Jantantrik Vikas Party	Anil Kumar	6,177	3.64	
RLSP	Santosh Singh Chandrawanshi	2,278	1.34	
Independent	Kumari Sanchana	2,196	1.29	
Independent	Sudama Prasad S/O Ramji Seth	1,591	0.94	
NOTA	None of the above	2,550	1.5	−1.02
Majority		11,015	6.48	+6.3
Turnout		169,857	55.63	+2.35
CPI(ML)L hold		Swing		

=== 2015 ===
2015 Bihar Legislative Assembly election: Tarari
Party	Candidate	Votes	%	±%
CPI(ML)L	Sudama Prasad	44,050	28.79	
LJP	Gita Pandey	43,778	28.61	
INC	Akhilesh Prasad Singh	40,957	26.77	
Independent	Lal Bihari Singh	7,832	5.12	
Independent	Vijay Singh	2,736	1.79	
SS	Sanjay Rai	2,425	1.58	
Sarvajan Kalyan Loktantrik Party	Shri Bhagwan Singh	1,391	0.91	
NOTA	None of the above	3,858	2.52	
Majority		272	0.18	
Turnout		153,002	53.28	
