= Tarari, Bihar =

Tarari Tarāri
- Village
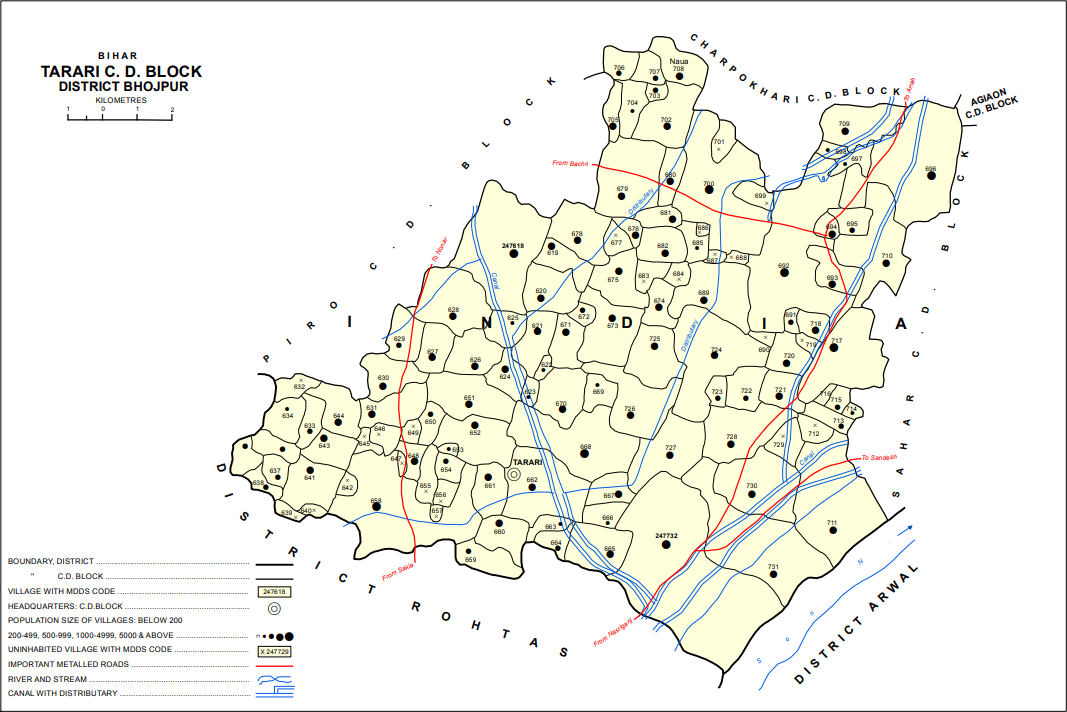
- Map of Tarari block

- Location in Bihar, India Tarari (India)
- Coordinates: 25.20754°N 84.4072°E
- Country: India
- State: Bihar
- District: Bhojpur

Area
  - Total: 0.393 km^{2} (0.152 sq mi)
- Elevation: 91 m (299 ft)

Population (2011)
  - Total: 3,586
  - Density: 9,120/km^{2} (23,600/sq mi)

Languages
  - Official: Hindi
- Time zone: UTC+5:30 (IST)
- PIN: 802209

Tarari is a village and corresponding community development block in Bhojpur district of Bihar, India. As of 2011, its population was 3,586, in 393 households. The total block population was 182,631, in 28,316 households.

== Geography ==
Tarari, along with the entirety of Tarari block, is located on the Arrah plains.

== Demographics ==
Tarari is a rural block, with no large urban centres. As of 2011, its sex ratio was 926, which was higher than the Bhojpur district ratio of 907. The sex ratio was higher in the 0-6 age group, with 945 females for every 1000 males, which was also higher than the district value of 918 for this age group. Members of scheduled castes made up 20.15% of the block population and members of scheduled tribes made up 0.11%. The block's literacy rate was 71.04%, which was marginally higher than the district rate of 70.47%. There was a 24.99% gender literacy gap between men (83.03%) and women (58.04%) in Tarari block, which was slightly above the district average of 23.71%.

Most of Tarari block's workforce was employed in agriculture in 2011, with 24.77% being cultivators who owned or leased their own land and another 55.15% being agricultural labourers who worked someone else's land for wages. (The 55.15% of workers being agricultural labourers was the highest proportion in Bhojpur district.) 5.23% were household industry workers, and the remaining 14.85% were other workers. The block's workforce was predominantly male: there were 12,413 male workers and 2,573 female workers in 2011. Higher proportions of men than women were counted as cultivators and agricultural labourers, while greater proportions of women than men worked as household industry workers and other workers.

== Villages ==
Tarari block contains the following 115 villages:

Village name	Total land area (hectares)	Population (in 2011)
Sedha	678	5,182
Beldehri	136	1,183
Ramnagar	183	1,749
Baghsanda	139	1,472
Gopalpur	28	410
Bipan Dih	34	447
Amaharua	124	1,148
Kusdehra	99	388
Gaharua	163	1,441
Hardiya	117	1,591
Jethwar Bhat	326	4,038
Burhi Jethwar	121	540
Itman	167	1,009
Kusumhi	170	1,592
Sadhwa Yakub	71	0
Karma Misir	84	910
Gudan Dih	117	294
Malwe	91	770
Hurrua	64	694
Parasiya	52	528
Parariya	44	596
Sapta Dih	33	0
Manpur	19	0
Bhakura	196	2,835
Gaura	32	0
Dhamna	130	1,023
Sarphora	151	1,215
Salempur	36	0
Phitko	69	0
Bheriya	15	0
Kharwana	64	1,956
Adhar Dih	28	0
Kudariya	68	706
Shankar Dih	263	2,185
Sara	271	2,235
Kisai Dih	19	373
Durupur	43	943
Dharhiya	81	0
Birhar	42	0
Ojha Dih	14	0
Karath	764	8,470
Mahesh Dih	130	682
Mahadeopur	138	1,409
Akraunj	139	1,236
Tarari (block headquarters)	393	3,586
Bhopatpur	55	405
Paranpura	65	924
Saidanpur	208	1,621
Tanrwa	49	229
Bandhwa	130	2,340
Barka Gaon	514	6,335
Surmana	85	469
Bhadsera	200	1,655
Dihri	118	1,252
Gangti	45	711
Dumaria	262	2,733
Itahri	105	1,039
Ranni	192	1,327
Patkhauli	46	1,340
Manikpur	40	0
Basauri	252	2,198
Sikraur	392	3,560
Fatehpur	90	2,021
Labna	93	1,288
Nirbhai Dehra	119	1,057
Kiratpur	64	0
Kariman Chak	40	0
Gazo Dih	74	283
Santokha Chak	0.4	0
Salhadia	23	0
Afzal Chak	17	0
Chanda	334	3,016
Deo Arazi	25	0
Sikarhata Milik	31	705
Sikarhata	895	8,587
Sikarhata Khurd	125.6	3,297
Noni Dih	49	1,068
Basra	93	963
Bagar	736	6,118
Khairullah Chak	72	441
Harpur	42	484
Usri	52	0
Kurmorhi	694	5,125
Dilia	59	0
Chakia	232	2,694
Balua	25	829
Pipra	102	403
Nawa Dih	80	1,070
Harla	83	567
Rajmal Dih	71	933
Naua	139	1,761
Dari Dih	273	1,518
Panwari	397	4,466
Imadpur	632	3,788
Patelwa	54	0
Bahadurpur	63	889
Lachchhi Dih	17	336
Bishamharpur	35	952
Kanu Dih	30	133
Moap Buzurg	412	5,386
Khutaha	56	2,389
Sonar Dihri	32	0
Sauna	118	1,164
Sahiara	115	2,158
Berain	132	991
Narayanpur	46	901
Deo	482	4,398
Kab Dehra	230	2,374
Dhangawan	331	3,300
Warsi	305	1,789
Moap Khurd	321	3,329
Dewria	113	0
Bishunpura	367	3,624
Rajpur	675	3,306
Bihta	1,495	9,756
