= Charpokhari =

Charpokhari Chārpokhri
- Village
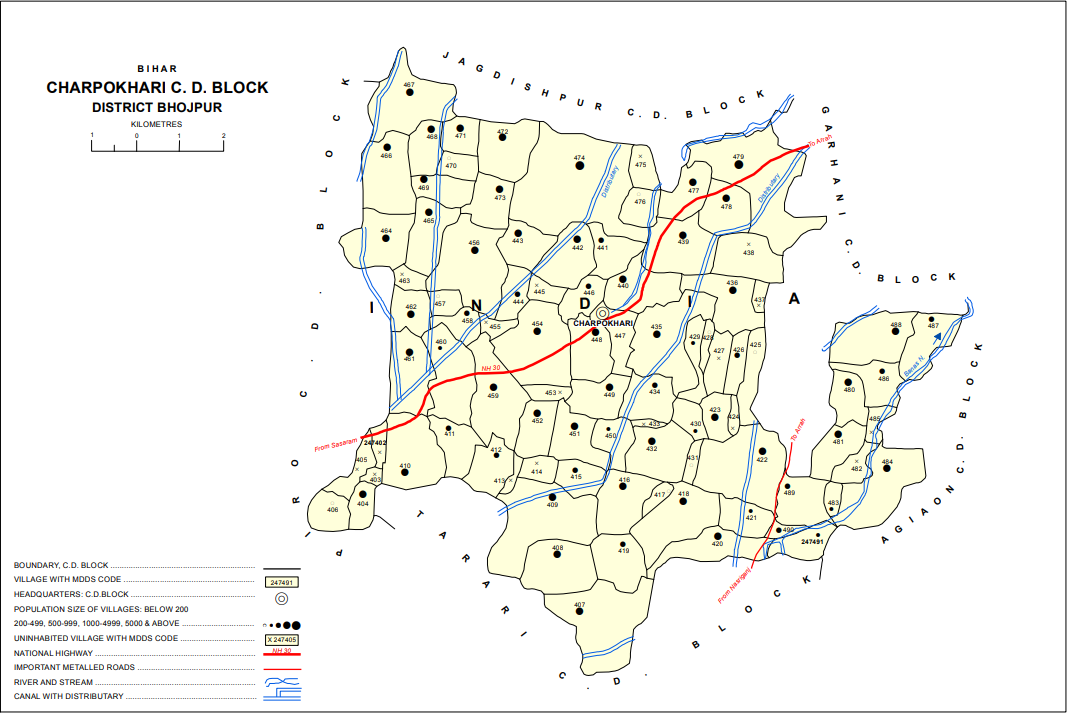
- Map of Charpokhari block

- Location in Bihar, India Charpokhari (India)
- Coordinates: 25.36262°N 84.48101°E
- Country: India
- State: Bihar
- District: Bhojpur

Area
  - Total: 0.103 km^{2} (0.040 sq mi)
- Elevation: 77 m (253 ft)

Population (2011)
  - Total: 1,874
  - Density: 18,200/km^{2} (47,100/sq mi)

Languages
  - Official: Bhojpuri, Hindi
- Time zone: UTC+5:30 (IST)

Charpokhari (also spelled Charpokhri) is a village and corresponding community development block in Bhojpur district of Bihar, India. As of 2011, its population was 1,874, in 314 households. The total block population was 101,363, in 15,961 households.

== Demographics ==
Charpokhari is a rural subdistrict with no large urban centres. As of 2011, the block's sex ratio was 927, which was higher than both the overall Bhojpur district ratio of 907 and the rural-specific Bhojpur district ratio of 910. The sex ratio was lower in the 0-6 age group, with 916 females for every 1000 males, which was slightly below the district's overall (918) and rural (920) sex ratios in this age group. Members of scheduled castes made up 21.44% of the block's population (the highest proportion in Bhojpur) and members of scheduled tribes made up 0.02% (the lowest in Bhojpur). The literacy rate of Charpokhari block was 68.86%, which was lower than the district rate of 70.47%. Literacy was higher in men (81.91%) than in women (54.83%), with the corresponding 27.08% gender gap somewhat exceeding that of the district as a whole (23.71%).

Most of Charpokhari block's workforce in 2011 was employed in agriculture, with 30.70% of workers being cultivators who owned or leased their own land and another 49.89% being agricultural labourers who worked someone else's land for wages. 4.49% were household industry workers, and the remaining 14.92% were other workers. Most workers in the block were men: 24,011, compared to 6,646 women.

== Villages ==
Charpokhari block contains the following 90 villages:

| Village name | Total land area (hectares) | Population (in 2011) |
|---|---|---|
| Udhwa Dih | 40 | 0 |
| Pachma | 17 | 0 |
| Saropur | 55 | 1,056 |
| Piro Chak | 56 | 0 |
| Bharhatha | 53 | 96 |
| Sonbarsa | 333 | 2,711 |
| Kusamhi | 175 | 1,491 |
| Koel | 332 | 3,556 |
| Dhanauti | 220 | 2,294 |
| Dube Dehra | 90 | 588 |
| Repura | 131 | 600 |
| Koel Arazi | 25 | 0 |
| Gauri Dih | 48 | 0 |
| Dherha | 102 | 701 |
| Kumhaila | 159 | 2,111 |
| Repura | 33 | 143 |
| Itaura | 210 | 2,080 |
| Madhuri | 125 | 633 |
| Mansagar | 160 | 1,656 |
| Kashi Dih | 76 | 349 |
| Majhiawan | 314 | 2,042 |
| Panre Dih | 73 | 1,240 |
| Patkhauli | 18 | 0 |
| Sundarpur | 68 | 38 |
| Keshopur | 47 | 984 |
| Betari | 61 | 0 |
| Rasulpur | 29 | 163 |
| Malipur | 92 | 390 |
| Janea Dih | 51 | 254 |
| Jairampur | 29 | 50 |
| Kori | 157 | 1,917 |
| Narotimpur | 14 | 0 |
| Balihari | 119 | 927 |
| Barni | 236 | 1,894 |
| Kathrain | 169 | 2,031 |
| Kathrain Milik | 24 | 0 |
| Sukru | 149 | 0 |
| Siya Dih | 209 | 2,452 |
| Amurza | 153 | 1,353 |
| Sahaspura | 94 | 652 |
| Madariha | 151 | 2,002 |
| Madain | 111 | 1,264 |
| Chand Dihri | 76.8 | 798 |
| Rampur | 35 | 0 |
| Kharanti | 87 | 529 |
| Charpokhari (block headquarters) | 103 | 1,874 |
| Dekura | 119 | 1,017 |
| Ekauni | 113 | 1,091 |
| Barar English | 75 | 291 |
| Barar | 124 | 1,141 |
| Bhairo Dih | 108 | 1,072 |
| Madanpur | 35 | 0 |
| Malaur | 274 | 3,299 |
| Sarbahan Dehri | 28 | 0 |
| Makundpur | 294 | 3,537 |
| Dubea | 41 | 99 |
| Paliya | 70.9 | 907 |
| Nagri | 219.3 | 4,616 |
| Kinu Dheri | 201 | 396 |
| Nagraon | 143 | 1,692 |
| Harpur | 102 | 1,366 |
| Dhusra | 34 | 0 |
| Thakuri | 189 | 2,096 |
| Jaitpura | 136 | 1,365 |
| Kanai | 202 | 2,025 |
| Kasmariya | 227 | 1,496 |
| Dhob Diha | 96 | 1,168 |
| Madarha | 82 | 1,031 |
| Madarhi | 44 | 99 |
| Panraria | 77 | 1,405 |
| Dumariya | 175 | 1,220 |
| Lilari | 109 | 1,866 |
| Pasaur | 557 | 5,237 |
| Chakiya | 53 | 0 |
| Kauwa Khot | 63 | 138 |
| Bagu Sara | 91 | 1,038 |
| Barahra | 126 | 1,759 |
| Semraon | 423 | 6,039 |
| Bhaluana | 101 | 1,370 |
| Pirtampur | 99 | 1,087 |
| Gangajal Dehri | 61 | 0 |
| Thegua | 27 | 338 |
| Babu Bandh | 218 | 2,289 |
| Pem Akurha | 33 | 0 |
| Dego Dehri | 104 | 878 |
| Kalianpur | 125 | 550 |
| Bajen | 184 | 1,456 |
| Manaini | 122 | 837 |
| Bagahi | 25 | 642 |
| Tetaria | 92 | 491 |
