= Kanti Singh =

Indian politician (born 1957)

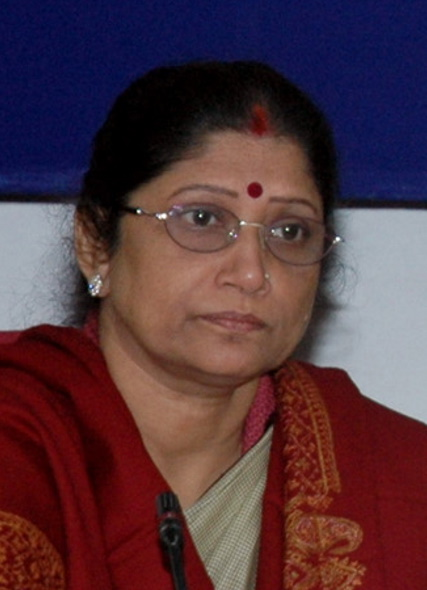

Member of Parliament, Lok Sabha
- In office 13 May 2004 — 16 May 2009
- Preceded by: Ram Prasad Singh
- Succeeded by: Meena Singh
- Constituency: Arrah
- In office 9 May 1996 — 9 March 1998
- Preceded by: Ram Prasad Singh
- Succeeded by: Bashishtha Narain Singh
- Constituency: Bikramganj
- In office 6 October 1999 — 13 May 2004
- Preceded by: Bashishtha Narain Singh
- Succeeded by: Ajit Kumar Singh
- Constituency: Bikramganj

Personal details
- Born: 8 March 1957 (age 69) Rohtas, Bihar, India
- Party: RJD
- Spouse: Lt. Keshaw Prasad Singh
- Children: Rishi Kumar, Kajal Singh
- As of 26 September, 2009

Kanti Singh (born 8 March 1957) is a former Central Minister and National President of RJD Women Cell. She was a member of the 14th Lok Sabha of India. She once represented the Arrah constituency of Bihar and is a national general secretary of Rashtriya Janata Dal (RJD) political party. She was earlier elected to 11th and 13th Lok Sabha from Bikramganj constituency. She has held various portfolios in Central Government as Minister of Coal and Mines, Heavy Industries and Public Enterprises, Human Resources Development (HRD), Women Child and Development and Tourism and Culture.

== Posts held ==
| # | From | To | Position |
|---|---|---|---|
| 01 | 1991 | 1997 | General Secretary, Janata Dal, Bihar |
| 02 | 1992 | 1995 | Member, District Consumer Forum |
| 03 | 1995 | 1996 | Member, Bihar Legislative Assembly |
| 04 | 1995 | 1996 | Member, Estimates Committee, Bihar Legislative Assembly |
| 05 | 1996 | 1998 | Elected to 11th Lok Sabha from Bikramganj |
| 06 | 1996 | 1996 | Union Minister of State, Human Resource Development |
| 07 | 1996 | 1997 | Union Minister of State (Independent Charge), Coal |
| 08 | 1999 | 2004 | Elected to 13th Lok Sabha from Bikramganj |
| 09 | 1999 | 2000 | Member, Committee on Petroleum and Chemicals |
| 10 | 1999 | 2004 | Member, Committee on Commerce |
| 11 | 1999 | 2004 | Member, Consultative Committee, Ministry of Civil Aviation |
| 12 | 1999 | 2004 | Member, Committee on Women Empowerment |
| 13 | 1999 | 2004 | Member, Committee on Official Language |
| 14 | 2000 | 2004 | Member, Consultative Committee, Ministry of Human Resource Development |
| 15 | 2000 | 2004 | Member, Committee on Information Technology |
| 16 | 2004 | 2009 | Elected to 14th Lok Sabha from Arrah |
| 17 | 2004 | 2006 | Union Minister of State, Ministry of Human Resource Development |
| 18 | 2006 | 2009 | Union Minister of State, Ministry of Heavy Industries & Public Enterprises |
