= Custodial deaths in India =

Custodial deaths in India refer to the deaths of persons in judicial or police custody while undergoing a trial or serving a sentence. The Indian Evidence Act, and Code of Criminal Procedure lays down several guidelines that prevents harming of prisoners. In 1997, India signed the United Nations Convention against Torture, however it is yet to rattify the same. The National Human Rights Commission of India reported 2,307 deaths had occurred in custody from 1 April 2021 to 28 February 2022.

== Statutory provisions ==
The Article 20 (3) of the Indian Constitution protects the citizens from self incrimination. Sections 24 and 25 of the Indian Evidence Act renders forced confessions and confessions made to the police irrelevant in trials.

As per the Code of Criminal Procedure (CrPC),

- Section 176 (I) states that if a person in custody dies or disappears, or a woman is raped in custody, the Judicial Magistrate has the power to order an inquiry.
- Section 46 states the police cannot kill anyone while performing an arrest.
- Section 49 states the police cannot use excessive restraints while performing an arrest.
- Section 54 allows a magistrate to appoint a medical petitioner to examine the accused under-trials.

The penal code allows sentences of up to seven years for policemen in cases of torture.

=== Reforms ===
On 18 December 1996, in the D. K. Basu vs. state of West Bengal case, which was a result of a Public Interest Litigation based a letter sent by D. K. Basu, a former Calcutta High Court judge and then executive chairman of Legal Aid Services of West Bengal, to the Chief Justice of India on 26 August 1986, the Supreme Court of India suggested 11 guidelines which covered arresting procedures and compensation in case of death of the detainee. The letter had earlier requested the court to examine the issue of frequent custodial deaths, form guidelines to be followed during arrest and formulate compensation to be provided to the victims/families in case of custodial torture or death. The Code of Criminal Procedure was amended in 2008 to incorporate some of the suggestions of the Supreme Court verdict.

On 6 May 2010, the Lok Sabha passed the Prevention of Torture Bill, 2010. However, the Rajya Sabha referred the bill to a select committee as it was felt that the bill was not up to the standards of the United Nations Convention against Torture. The revised bill lapsed when the 15th Lok Sabha was dissolved on 18 May 2014.

In 2018, the Law Commission of India suggested in a report that India should ratify the United Nations Convention against Torture, which was signed in 1997, and pass a standalone law against torture of citizens by government agents. The report pointed out that India was facing difficulties in extraditing criminals from other nations dues its reputation of custodial torture.

== Statistics ==
According to a report released by National Campaign Against Torture, in 2019, there were 1606 deaths which occurred in judicial custody and 125 deaths in police custody. On 26 July 2022, while answering a question in the Lok Sabha, the union minister of state for home affairs revealed that 4,484 cases of custodial deaths were reported in India during the period FY 2020-21 to FY 2021-22. The National Human Rights Commission of India reported 1,606 deaths occurred in judicial custody and 125 deaths in police custody from 1 April 2021 to 28 February 2022.

=== State-wise custodial deaths ===
States-wise reported custodial deaths
State	2020-21	2021-22
Andhra Pradesh	50	48
Arunachal Pradesh	3	2
Assam	19	22
Bihar	159	237
Chhattisgarh	67	93
Goa	1	6
Gujarat	99	126
Haryana	49	109
Himachal Pradesh	8	7
Jharkhand	54	81
Karnataka	8	10
Kerala	5	8
Madhya Pradesh	163	201
Maharashtra	143	197
Manipur	1	1
Meghalaya	7	13
Mizoram	3	8
Nagaland	2	9
Odisha	93	67
Punjab	72	153
Rajasthan	74	94
Sikkim	4	2
Tamil Nadu	63	109
Telangana	23	25
Tripura	1	6
Uttar Pradesh	451	501
Uttarakhand	47	27
West Bengal	185	257
Andaman and Nicobar	0	1
Chandigarh	2	1
Dadra and Nagar Haveli	0	0
Daman and Diu	0	0
Delhi NCR	45	65
Jammu & Kashmir	9	17
Ladakh	0	0
Lakshadweep	0	0
Puducherry	0	1
Total	1940	2544

== Notable cases ==
- Rajan case: College student P. Rajan was arrested by the Kerala Police on 1 March 1976 during the Emergency period. Rajan's father filed a habeas corpus petition in the Kerala High Court and as the police failed to produce Rajan on the stipulated date of 21 April 1976, he was presumed to have died at the Kakkayam torture camp in police custody.
- On 1 December 1987, the Orissa Police arrested Suman Behera at Sundergarh. His dead body was found on nearby train tracks on 2 December 1987. Suman's mother Nilabati Behera sued the Government of Orissa, and the Supreme Court, in its verdict on 23 March 1993, ordered the state government to pay a compensation of ₹150,000 (equivalent to ₹1.1 million or US$13,000 in 2023), which set a precedent for compensation in such cases.
- On 27 September 2005, Three policemen of the Kerala Police arrested Udayakumar on suspicion of theft in Thiruvananthapuram. After his death in police custody, on 23 July 2018, a Central Bureau of Investigation (CBI) special court found two of the officers guilty and sentenced them to death, while the other accused died during the trial.
- On 12 June 2019, Kerala Police arrested 49-year-old K. Rajkumar at Nedumkandam in a case related to a financial crime. While he was produced before the court on 16 June 2019, he died on 21 June 2021 after being tortured in custody.
- Custodial death of P Jayaraj and Bennicks: On 19 June 2019, P. Jeyaraj and his son Bennicks were arrested by the Tamil Nadu Police at Sathankulam for allegedly keeping their store open past the government stipulated timings. They were tortured in custody, and Bennicks died on 22 June 2020 and P. Jeyaraj died later on 23 June 2020. The case was transferred to the CBI, nine police officers were arrested later, and the Friends of Police, a community initiative, was discontinued in its aftermath.
- On 28 June 2025, 27-year-old B. Ajith Kumar was illegally taken into custody by the Tamil Nadu Police for investigation into an alleged theft case in Thirupuvanam, Sivaganga. He later died of police torture during the unofficial interrogation. The case was transferred to the CBI after the intervention of the Madras High Court, and at least four policemen were arrested.

== See also ==
- Encounter killings by police
- List of cases of police brutality in India
