= List of cases of police brutality in India =

This is a list of notable cases of police brutality in India. This list also includes events from the British Raj.

== British India ==
- ?? September 1895 – In Old Dhule Township, Maharashtra, Khambete Guruji, inspired by Lokmanya Tilak, started Sarvajanik Ganeshotsav. On the day of Anant Chaturdashi in 1895, the Ganesh Visarjan procession passed from the vicinity of the Sai Masjid, and communal altercations between Hindus and Muslims ensued. To control the riot, the police opened fire on the crowd, killing and wounding many. To date, the Ganpati temple is known as the Khuni (lit. Bloody) Ganpati. However it acts as a symbol of communal harmony with both Hindus and Muslims participating in the Ganeshotsave
- 15 April 1919 – After the Jallianwala Bagh massacre, protests occurred in Gujranwala against the killings of civilians at Amritsar. Police and aircraft were used against the protestors, resulting in at least 379 deaths and leaving more than a thousand people injured.
- 12 December 1930 – Bombay cotton mill worker Babu Genu Said was crushed by a truck at the order of the police. He was an active participant in the protests, organized by Indian independence activists against the import of foreign-made cloth. His death resulted in a huge wave of anger, strikes, and protests throughout Bombay.

== Post-Independence ==
=== 1950s ===
- 13 June 1959 – The Angamaly firing involved police firing at a group of people marching to the police station protesting against the incumbent Communist government. The firing killed seven people and injured many others.

=== 1960s ===
- 25 March 1966 – Pravir Chandra Bhanj Deo, first Oriya ruler and 20th Maharaja of Bastar state, was killed in police firing at the steps of his own palace at Jagdalpur along with many others.

=== 1970s ===
- 1976 – The Rajan case.
- 18 April 1976 – The Turkman gate demolition and firing.
- 1979 to 1980 – The Bhagalpur blindings was an incident in Bhagalpur in the state of Bihar, India, when police blinded 31 undertrials (or convicted criminals, according to some versions), by pouring acid into their eyes.

=== 1980s ===
- 20 April 1981 – The 1981 Indravelli massacre was an incident where a gathering of Gond Adivasis, some organised by the Kondapalli Sitaramayya faction of the CPI(ML) and some attending the local market, were fired on by police officers at the village of Indravelli in Andhra Pradesh. The official report claimed that a group of 30 police and five officials opened fire after they were attacked, and one of their number was speared to death. The number of civilian deaths was cited as 13. Investigations by journalists and local human rights groups place the number of police present in the dozens, and the number of victims between 60 and 250
- 22 May 1987 – The Hashimpura massacre took place during the Hindu-Muslim riots in Meerut city in Uttar Pradesh state, India, when 19 personnel of the Provincial Armed Constabulary (PAC) allegedly rounded up 42 Muslim youths from the Hashimpura mohalla (locality) of the city, took them in truck to the outskirts, near Murad Nagar, in Ghaziabad district, where they were shot and their bodies were dumped in water canals. A few days later, dead bodies were found floating in the canals.

=== 1990s ===
- 20 June 1992 - Vachathi case – The Vachathi case involved a mass crime that occurred on 20 June 1992 in the village of Vachathi, in Dharmapuri district, Tamil Nadu. A team of 155 forest personnel, 108 policemen and six revenue officials entered the Tribal-dominated Vachathi village, searching for smuggled sandalwood and to gather information about Veerappan. Under the pretext of conducting a search, the team ransacked the villagers' property, destroyed their houses, killed their cattle, assaulted around 100 villagers, and raped 18 women.
- 30 October 1992 – 2 November 1992 – Ayodhya firing incident took place when Uttar Pradesh police fired live ammunition at civilians who were religious devotees or kar sevaks, assembled near the Ram Janmabhoomi site at Ayodhya.
- 21 July 1993 - The Kolkata firing took place in the vicinity of Writers' Building, the state secretariat when police tried to disperse a massive rally of the Youth Congress, organised by the Youth Congress president Mamata Banerjee. 13 people were shot dead by the police & 200 others (including Banerjee herself) were injured in police lathicharge.
- 1–2 October 1994 – The Rampur Tiraha firing involved police firing on unarmed Uttarakhand activists at Rampur Tiraha (crossing) in Muzaffarnagar district in Uttar Pradesh in India on the night of 1–2 October 1994. The activists, part of the agitation for the separate state of Uttarakhand, were going to Delhi to stage a dharna at Raj Ghat on Gandhi Jayanti, the following day, when alleged unprovoked police firing in the night of 1 October led to the death of six activists, and some women were allegedly raped and molested in the ensuing melee.
- 25 November 1994 – The Koothuparamba firing was a police action in the Kannur district of Kerala. The firing happened after the inauguration of the Co-operative Urban Bank's evening branch, when the DYFI protested against Communist Marxist Party (CMP) leader and Kerala's Minister, M.V. Raghavan. The police fired at the crowd for the protection of the Minister and public and private property. Five DYFI activists were dead, and six people were injured.
- 31 August 1995 - The 1995 Kodiyankulam violence, where a force of 600 policemen attacked the all-Dalit village of Kodiyankulam in Thoothukudi district, Tamil Nadu.
- 11 July 1997 - The 1997 Ramabai killings were a mass killing of Dalit residents of the Ramabai Ambedkar Nagar colony in Mumbai on 11 July 1997. A team of State Reserve Police Force members fired upon a crowd protesting the recent desecration of a statue of Constitution maker B. R. Ambedkar. 10 Dalits were killed, and 26 were injured in the incident.
- 1999 – The Manjolai Labourers massacre was brutal police action on a procession taken out in support of agitating tea estate workers, claimed 17 lives in Thirunelveli, Tamil Nadu.

=== 2000s ===
- 2003 – The Muthanga incident was a brutal police action on Adivasis who had gathered under Adivasi Gothra Mahasabha (AGMS) in protest to the Kerala Government's delay in allotting them land, which had been contracted in October 2001. Two fatalities were officially confirmed, the government later put the death toll at five. More than 15 Adivasis were fatally wounded.
- 2005 The Uruitti Kola case was. On 27 September 2005, three policemen of the Kerala Police arrested Udayakumar on suspicion of theft in Thiruvananthapuram. After he died in police custody on 23 July 2018, a Central Bureau of Investigation (CBI) special court found two of the officers guilty and sentenced them to death, while the other accused died during the trial.
- 2006 – Police opened fire on people protesting against land acquisition for SEZ of Videocon at Maan village in Pune.
- 2007 – Nandigram violence – Police opened fire on villagers protesting against land acquisition for building a SEZ with Indonesian real-estate company Salim group at Nandigram village in East Midnapore, West Bengal.
- 2008 – Haveri police shooting – Police opened fire on farmers protesting shortages of subsidized fertilizers during the pre-monsoon sowing season. Two protestors died during the shooting.
- 2009 – The Beemapally police shooting saw the police opening fire on the Muslim fishing community at Beemapally in Trivandrum District, Kerala who had gathered to protest the police inaction in controlling goons. The firing killed 6 and injured around 43-52 people, all Muslims.
- 23 July 2009 – at Khwairamband market, Imphal, Manipur police commandos killed an unarmed youth, Ch Sanjit Meitei, in an alleged encounter and later claimed to seize a pistol from him; in the ensuing encounter, a pregnant lady Rabina Devi was also killed, whom the police claimed was shot during the crossfire.

=== 2010s ===
- 2011 – The police opened fire on protesters protesting against the Jaitapur Nuclear Power Plant and killed one of the protesters.
- 3 June 2011 – The Forbesganj firing was an act of state brutality in which four villagers were killed near Forbesganj, a town in Bihar, India. An inquiry into the incident, conducted by a reputed NGO ANHAD, suggests a role of politicians from the Bharatiya Janata Party in the killings. The residents of the village of Bhajanpur were protesting the grant of land to a factory owned by the son of Bharatiya Janata Party politician Ashok Agarwal.
- 5 June 2011 – The 2011 Indian anti-corruption movement.
- 2013 – The Dhule Shootout was an incident in which police opened fire on violent Muslim youths, killing 6 and injuring around 20. Police were also involved in burning Muslim houses and destroying their property.
- 25 August 2015 – The Patidar community organised an assembly of over 500,000 people at the GMDC Ground in Ahmedabad demanding OBC quota. The convener Hardik Patel led others remaining there on hunger strike after the formal rally was over. Police arrested him in the evening, using a lathicharge during which journalists were among those injured.
- 13 October 2015 – Punjab police shot two protestors and injured 50 others at a protest in Kotkapura, Punjab, following the Guru Granth Sahib desecration in different parts of Punjab. Police claimed to be acting in self-defence.
- 2015 – The Andhra shootout was an incident in the Seshachalam forest in Chittoor District, Andhra Pradesh that killed 20 suspected woodcutters.
- 2015 – The Mumbai Police was found to have engaged in moral policing, after several officers raided hotels and guest houses near Aksa Beach and Madh Island, and detained about 40 couples. Most of them were consenting couples in private rooms, but they were charged under Section 110 (Indecent behaviour in public) of the Bombay Police Act and fined ₹1,200 (US$12). Then Commissioner Rakesh Maria order a probe into the raids after criticism.
- 2018 – The Thoothukudi violence was an incident in Thoothukudi, Tamil Nadu where 13 unarmed protestors were killed and 100+ injured by the Tamil Nadu Police.
- 2019 –The 2019 Jamia Milia Islamia attack, during the Citizenship Amendment Act protests, police attacked student protesters as well as non-protesting students at the campus of Jamia Milia Islamia On the same day, Police and Rapid Action Force injured several students—including some serious injuries—by firing tear-gas shells, rubber bullets, stun grenades and pellets at students of the Aligarh Muslim University protesting against the same act. The security forces reportedly hurled communal abuses at the students. The forces fired tear gas shells inside hostel rooms and set ablaze vehicles belonging to students.

=== 2020s ===
- 22 June 2020 – Custodial death of father and son, Thoothukudi, Tamil Nadu The duo had been beaten, brutally tortured, and sexually assaulted.
- 23 September 2021 – In Sipajhar, Assam, three people, including Moinul Haque, were killed and several others injured by police firing during a protest staged by evicted residents.
- 28 June 2025 – A 27-year-old temple guard, B.Ajith Kumar, was illegally taken into custody by the Tamil Nadu Police for investigation into an alleged theft case in Thirupuvanam, Sivaganga. He later died of police torture during the unofficial interrogation.
- Bharat Bhushan Tiwari's encounter in Bihar.

== See also ==
- Law enforcement in India
- Police Complaints Authority (India)
- Police Mitra scheme
