= 2009 Beemapally police shooting =

Incident in Kerala, India

2009 Beemapally Police Shooting
- Location: Beemapally, Kerala, India
- Date: 17 May 2009
- Deaths: 6
- Injuries: 42

The 2009 Beemapally police shooting was a police shooting that happened at Beemapally, a coastal area in southern Kerala, India on 17 May 2009. Six people died and 42 others were injured. Four policemen were suspended and the city police commissioner was transferred in the aftermath.

== Investigation ==
A judicial commission headed by district judge K. Ramakrishnan investigated the incident. The Commission submitted a report to then chief minister Oommen Chandy in January 2012. Following the report, the state government requested the CBI to investigate the explosives found at the location. The CBI submitted a closure report on 2013, stating that the explosives were from Amen Explosives Private Limited, Nagpur, but they could not establish how the explosives arrived at the location and which people were behind it.

The judicial commission report rejected allegations that the police firing is unjustifiable and concluded that it was the police action which prevented a large scale communal riot. The Beemapally Muslim Jama-Ath Action committee rejected the judicial commission report by saying "The Ramakrishnan Commission report has not offered any justice to the victims. In fact, it has portrayed people from the Muslim community in bad light" and demanded strong action against the policemen involved.

== In popular culture ==
The plot of the 2021 film Malik is supposedly based on this event. Director Mahesh Narayanan replied that the movie was "taken from surroundings but it's still a fictional place with fictional characters.". In film, a Muslim aligned party was shown to be the brain behind the incidents, while in reality, so called parties have no roots in the area where incidents happened. Many criticised it as a rewriting of very recent history in favour of left wing politics using the convenience of cinematic liberty, as all the events happened during the rule of a leftist government.

== See also ==
- List of cases of police brutality in India
