= Malik (2021 film) =

2021 film by Mahesh Narayanan

- Online release poster
- Directed by: Mahesh Narayanan
- Written by: Mahesh Narayanan
- Produced by: Anto Joseph
- Starring: Fahadh Faasil
- Cinematography: Sanu Varghese
- Edited by: Mahesh Narayanan
- Music by: Sushin Shyam
- Production companies: Anto Joseph Film Company; Carnival Movie Network; AP International
- Distributed by: Amazon Prime Video
- Release date: 15 July 2021
- Running time: 162 minutes
- Country: India
- Language: Malayalam
- Budget: ₹27 crore

Malik (transl. Lord), stylized as mālik with diacritics, is a 2021 Indian Malayalam-language epic political crime drama film written, directed, and edited by Mahesh Narayanan. It was produced by Anto Joseph through Anto Joseph Film Company along with Carnival Movie Network. The film stars Fahadh Faasil with Nimisha Sajayan, Vinay Forrt, Jalaja, Joju George, Dileesh Pothan and Indrans in supporting roles. The music was composed by Sushin Shyam.

Principal photography began on 3 September 2019 and was completed on 18 January 2020, with major portions filmed across Kochi, Thiruvananthapuram and Lakshadweep. The film's cinematography was handled by Sanu John Varghese. The film's theatrical release was postponed multiple times due to the COVID-19 pandemic, and was later opted for an OTT release through Amazon Prime Video on 15 July 2021. The plot of the film is loosely based on the 2009 Beemapally police shooting.

The theatrical release of Malik was delayed due to the COVID-19 pandemic. It later abandoned plans for a theatrical release due to COVID-19 pandemic and was released on Amazon Prime Video on 15 July 2021.

== Plot ==
Ahammad Ali Sulaiman is the godfather of Ramadapally, a coastal town in Thiruvananthapuram where Muslims and Christians live together. He prepares to undertake the Hajj pilgrimage in his middle years on the insistence of his Christian wife Roselyn. Sulaiman and his friend Aboobacker, a political leader, are on the verge of fallout over land acquisition from the locals for a harbour project. At the airport, the police arrest Sulaiman under the Terrorist and Disruptive Activities (Prevention) Act (TADA).

The police assign Shibu, a goon to kill Sulaiman in custody extrajudicially but he dies in an explosion. They then intimidate Freddy, a juvenile arrested for throwing steel bombs at the police, into doing it. Freddy is the son of David Christudas, Roselyn's elder brother and Sulaiman's nephew. David was a friend of Sulaiman's but now holds a grudge against him.

On the police's insistence, Sulaiman's mother Jameela meets Freddy. In the 1960s, the Muslims and Christians of Ramadapally lived in harmony. The Christian fishermen community primarily lived in its Edavathura suburb. Sulaiman, David, Peter and Hameed dropped out of school and engaged in petty crimes, working for Chandran, a local goon. Chandran disowned them after Sulaiman sends trash dumped at the local mosque back to the disposers. Sulaiman and his friends started smuggling on their own and he sets up his own shop.

Sulaiman's earnestness impressed the sub-collector Anwar Ali. Sulaiman asked Anwar to clear the garbage dump and build a school there. Wanting to settle scores, Chandran sets fire to their godown and the children working there die. Sulaiman kills Chandran in retaliation. Anwar questions Sulaiman, who confesses to his crime, and challenges Anwar to arrest him before Ramadapally's residents. Forced to leave, Anwar extracted a promise from Jameela to testify against Sulaiman. Jameela asks Freddy not to kill Sulaiman and says he should be brought before the law. David and his wife visit Freddy in jail and Freddy enquires why David hates Sulaiman.

A look out notice was issued against Sulaiman and he absconded to Minicoy, Lakshadweep along with David and Roselyn. Sulaiman and Roselyn are married with David's approval. Sulaiman gained Roselyn's approval to raise their children as Muslims. When David returned to the coast, David's father told him that the police beat their men and raped their women. Anwar told David that the Muslims reaped the benefits and the consequences were suffered by the coastal Christian fishermen. David was appalled but conflicted. He convinced Sulaiman to appear before the court. Sulaiman's mother gave a statement against Sulaiman and he was remanded for three months. Roselyn gave birth to a boy who David named Antony and performed his baptism. When Sulaiman is released, he interrupts the ritual and shouts at David. He names his son Ameer. David is aggrieved and ends his friendship with Sulaiman.

Sulaiman received a consignment of smuggled weapons which he refused and hid under a pit. The 2004 Indian Ocean earthquake strikes and causes disproportionate losses to the Christian fishermen community there. Sulaiman engages in the humanitarian efforts. He continually opposes development projects that displace the locals. Anwar, the police, and MLA P. A. Aboobacker, who is playing both sides for the land acquisition, manipulated David into starting a riot at the mosque premises during Uroos celebrations. Aboo's goons murder a fellow and pin it on David, leading to a fight between Christians and Muslims. Ameer was killed in police firing. Some of the local goons use the hidden weapons and a bloody riot occurs. Sulaiman's supporters ride a car over Anwar. David is shot by Sulaiman's goons and becomes disabled.

David and his wife ask Freddy to follow through with his task. He is transferred into Sulaiman's cell. Freddy attempts to strangle Sulaiman during Fajr prayer but fails. Sulaiman breaks down and blames David for his son's death and the riots. Sulaiman suffers a panic attack. The jail doctor arrives and strangles Sulaiman, declaring him dead by suicide. The doctor is Anwar's daughter, who is bedridden with full-body paralysis.

Freddy is released from jail and enters the mosque where Sulaiman's last rites are performed. He throws a stone at Aboobacker who was inciting communal violence in Sulaiman's name. In a mid-credits scene, Anwar reveals to the media that the riots at Ramadapally were instigated by the police with the help of the government.

== Cast ==
- Fahadh Faasil as Ahammadali Sulaiman / Ali Ikka
  - Roshan Sabu as Teenage Sulaiman
    - Immanuel as Young Sulaiman
- Nimisha Sajayan as Roselyn, Sulaiman's wife and David's sister
- Vinay Forrt as David Christudas, Sulaiman's friend and Roselyn's brother
- Joju George as Anwar Ali IAS
- Dileesh Pothan as P. A. Aboobacker, Party President of the Islam Union League (IUL)
- Indrans as CI George Zachariah
- Jalaja as Jameela, Sulaiman's mother
- Salim Kumar as Moosakka "Moosa", Sulaiman's mentor
  - Chandu Salim Kumar as Young Moosa
- Parvathy Krishna as Dr. Shermin
- Dinesh Prabhakar as Peter Esthappan
- Sanal Aman as Freddy, David's son and Sulaiman's nephew
- Amal Rajdev as Hameed Mohammed, Sulaiman's right-hand-man
- Divya Prabha as Ayesha, Sulaiman's sister
- Meenakshi Raveendran as Ramlath, Sulaiman's daughter
- Vasudevan Sajeeh as Ameer, Sulaiman's son
- Chandhunadh as SP Rishabh
- Appani Sarath as Shibu
- Rajesh Sharma as Jail Superintendent
- Devaki Rajendran as Mary David, David's wife
- Parvathi T. as Rajamma, David and Roselyn's mother
- Nisthar Ahmed as Chandran, a smuggler
- Irshad as Chief Secretary to the State
- Kiran Peethambran as SI Rajasekharan
- Rajesh Balraj as DGP Rajkumar IPS
- Jolly Chirayath as Inspector General of Prisons
- Assif Yogi as Shahul Kareem
- Mano Jose as Christudas
- Sudhi Koppa as Shanavas
- Nadan Unni as Latheef
- Fahim Safar as Asif
- Sarath Sabha

== Production ==
=== Development ===
Following Take Off (2017), Mahesh Narayanan started working on his second directorial with Dulquer Salmaan in the lead. However, that project was put on hold and he moved on to another film. In May 2019, it was reported that Mahesh has cast Fahadh Faasil and Parvathy Thiruvothu in his new film, whom he had directed in Take Off. Sanu John Varghese was hired as cinematographer and Sushin Shyam as the composer, who revealed the film's title as Malik. The filmmakers announced an ensemble cast of Biju Menon, Nimisha Sajayan, Vinay Forrt, Jalaja, Dileesh Pothan and Indrans being part of the project, while Menon was replaced by Joju George in December. It was reportedly made under an estimated budget of ₹25 crore, becoming Fahadh's most expensive film to date. According to Narayan, "at its core, Malik is a political thriller".

=== Characters ===
Reports had claimed that Fahadh plays a role of a politician named Sulaimaan Malik. His role was rumoured to be similar of Michael Corleone in The Godfather (1972) portrayed by Al Pacino or Velu Naicker in Nayakan (1987) portrayed by Kamal Haasan. However, Narayanan revealed that his role is based on a real-life person who died in 1986. Since the plot is based on land acquisition cases in the coastal regions of Thiruvananthapuram in Kerala, Mahesh had stated that "The film revolves around a place where there was a resistance against this constant threat of displacement of a minority community, and a person who was responsible for making his people rise up", further describing his character as "someone who emerged as a leader among the community".

The film revolves around Sulaimaan's character spanning from the age of 21 to 58, and Fahadh shed 10 to 15 kilograms, for the younger version of his character. The aged Sulaimaan's look was inspired by Fahadh's grandfather. It was after experimenting with different looks that Mahesh zeroed in on Fahadh's grandfather. He said the "biggest challenge" of Fahadh was to shoot the younger portions, as he had to lose weight. The film was shot chronologically from aged to young as he lost weight.

=== Filming ===
Principal photography began on 3 September 2019 in Fort Kochi. Production designer Santhosh Raman recreated an entire coastal town in Kalamassery replicating 1980s, where a major part of the film was shot, and another set was created in Thiruvananthapuram. Since the film has large crowd scenes and handling crowd in real locations is difficult, they shot the film in a fictional location created by them, in a controlled environment. Hollywood stunt choreographer Lee Whittaker was part of the crew. Filming was completed on 18 January 2020 and post-production works began soon after its completion. The team took two months for visual effects and 95 percent of post-production works were completed before the COVID-19 pandemic lockdown in India. The team resumed the work later in May 2020.

== Music ==
The music is composed, produced and arranged by Sushin Shyam with lyrics penned by Anwar Ali and Sameer Binsi.

== Release ==
The film was initially scheduled for theatrical release in April 2020, but was postponed due to the COVID-19 pandemic in India. Unlike other South Indian films, which opted for a digital release during the pandemic, the producers of Malik waited for a theatrical release refuting offers from OTT platforms. In December 2020, a new release date of 13 May 2021 (Eid-al-Fitr weekend) was announced, with Narayanan stating that he hopes audience may start coming to theatres by April and May. The film was censored by the Central Board of Film Certification in December 2020, along with 46 other Malayalam films.

Theatrical release was delayed again due to the second wave of COVID-19. Due to the uncertainty and with the rise of COVID-19 cases across Kerala, producer Anto Joseph decided to sell Malik to streaming service Amazon Prime Video for ₹22 crore (US$2.3 million). Fahadh Faasil said that the decision was collective. Malik became one of the most-awaited theatrical releases to have a direct online release, following Drishyam 2. The film was released on 15 July 2021 on Prime Video.

The film has been invited at the 51st International Film Festival Rotterdam to be held from 26 January to 6 February 2022.

=== Home media ===
Aha secured the rights to Malik and premiered it on 11 August 2022.

== Reception ==
Malik received critical acclaim from critics, with praise for the cast performances, direction, cinematography, and Sushin Shyam's composition and score. On the review aggregator website Rotten Tomatoes, 90% of 10 critics' reviews are positive, with an average rating of 6.9/10.

The Times of India rated 3 out of 5 and wrote: "At a running time of 160 minutes, there are moments when the film lags and bits that seem a bit of a stretch and unclear ... The film is a bit long and has some confusing bits, but on the positive side, Malik reflects important issues of our times in a compelling manner". Firstpost rated 4 out of 5 and said that it is "a grand, gripping saga on tricky communal ground ... this is a challenging film, demanding as much from the viewer as it offers. Glancing away for a second could cost you, which is fair enough, but in one sphere the script could have done better", also praised the acting. The Hindu stated that the film is a "multi-layered mass entertainer, with fantastic character arcs and performances ... The script subtly looks at how extremists as well as power-hungry elements in every religion try to create and widen fissures with other communities", and also appreciated the cinematography and score. Baradwaj Rangan of Film Companion South wrote "Malik follows the Godfather template but the various touches given to characters and events percolate all the way down to make the film a very local one...Malik is one of those movies that would continue to reveal as you rewatch it because it’s densely packed with information. It’s a spectacle, not a grand spectacle but an intimate one. Malik proves that often great cinema is not about what’s being told but instead about how it’s told. In other words, form is more important than content."

The Federal wrote: "The cinematic craft behind ‘Malik’ towers over everything else ... It is a long-drawn-out, complex film with a significant political statement to make ... Though the director denies it, the film seems to be clearly linked to the 2009 Beemapally police shooting. The News Minute rated 4 out of 5 and wrote: "Malik appears to be loosely based on the Beemapally riots of 2009 ... The plot examines the relationship between religion, politics, gender and individual ambitions. It’s a complicated mix, but Mahesh steers the screenplay expertly, without plunging the viewer into confusion".

== Accolades ==
Year	Award	Category	Recipient	Notes
2022	National Film Award	National Film Award for Best Audiography • Re-recordist of the Final Mixed Track	Vishnu Govind	
2022	10th South Indian International Movie Awards	Best Director	Mahesh Narayanan	
2022	10th South Indian International Movie Awards	Best Debut Actor	Sanal Aman	
2021	Kerala State Film Awards	Best Lyricist	Anwar Ali	(song: Theerame Theerame)
2021	Kerala State Film Awards	Best Art Director	Santhosh Raman, Appunni Sajan	
2021	Kerala State Film Awards	Best Costume Designer	Dhanya Balakrishnan	
2021	67th Filmfare Awards South	Filmfare Award for Best Female Playback Singer – Malayalam	K. S. Chithra	(Song: Theerame Theerame)
2021	Reporter TV Film Awards	Best Singer Female	K. S. Chithra	(Song: Theerame Theerame)
