= Police Complaints Authority (India) =

State and district bodies in India

The Police Complaints Authority (PCA) is a body that adjudicates allegations of improper or shoddy investigations, refusal to file FIRs, custodial torture and high-handedness against the police. But its recommendations are high authorities and recognised governmental authority upon the state government for action against errant police personnel. Seventeen States have established the PCAs through State Police Acts, while ten states have done this through executive orders with a long-term goal of the PCAs is changing the policing culture and making it thoroughly professional.

== History ==
The Police Complaints Authority were to be established at the state and district levels following the judgement by the 2006 Supreme Court of India, in the Prakash Singh and Ors. v. Union of India and Ors. AIR 2006 SCC 1 Case, in response to the huge volume of complaints against the police and the endemic lack of accountability.

== State Police Complaints Authority ==
State Police Complaints Authority makes recommendations to government for taking disciplinary action against erring police officers.

Elected members of PCA will be seated at their respective posts by Thursday 29 August in their respective District Council hall. Programs have been fixed by Aayog Commissions of India and posts will be given in presence of District Higher Officials.

=== Assam Police Accountability Commissioner ===
BP Katakey is the Chairperson of this Assam Police Accountability Commission. In 2018, there were 288 public complaints on various counts against police personnel from across Assam including 143 of alleged police inaction or negligence.

=== Chandigarh Police Complaints Authority ===
In February 2020, inspector Baljeet Singh, former SHO of Mauli Jagran station was appointed as the in-charge of the Police Complaints Authority (PCA) in Chandigarh. There is also UT vigilance department in Chandigarh.

=== Delhi Police Complaints Authority ===
In February 2019, PCA is working under the chairmanship of Justice P S Teji (retd) and other members are Nutan Guha Biswas, IAS (retd), P Kamraj, IPS (retd) and Tinu Bajwa. Official e-mail for complaints is pca.delhi@nic.in/ and website is pca.delhigovt.nic.in.

=== Haryana Police Complaints Authority ===
Up to 2019, 681 complaints received by the authority with staff strength of three persons.

=== Jammu and Kashmir Police Complaints Authority ===
Ministry of Home Affairs may like to have one Police Complaints Authority for the Union Territory of Jammu & Kashmir and Union Territory of Ladakh keeping in view various aspects including single police force for both the UTs.

=== Karnataka Police Complaints Authority ===
Justice C R Kumaraswamy was appointed of chairperson of the Karnataka Police Complaints Authority. Public need to submit the complaint by contacting on phone number 08262 230403 or by mailing to dpcackm@karnataka.gov.in in case of complaints against deputy superintendent of police and police personnel of lower ranks and contacting on phone number 080 22386063 and visiting www.karnataka.gov.in/spca for complaints against the superintendent and officials of higher ranks.

=== Kerala Police complaints authority ===
In December 2018, Kerala Legislative Assembly, to overcome a 2017 HC verdict that the orders passed by the KPA chairperson or members without the quorum are invalid, passed the Kerala Police (Amendment) Bill 2018 enabling the PCA chairperson or one or more members, both in the state and district bodies, to dispose of petitions. Kerala Police complaints Authority's chairman is Justice V K Mohanan and it has no investigation wing to conduct probe into the complaints. The post of non police Chief Investigation Officer (CIO) was sanctioned in 2016 under the Mr.Oommen Chandy government, when Mr. Ramesh Chennithala served as the Home Minister, to investigate custodial violence in Kerala, first of this kind in India. A temporary independent investigation officer, criminologist and a diplomatic intelligence officer from RAW, Mr. Ajithkumar,(High Court of Kerala, WP(C) 8871/ 2021) was appointed to conduct the investigation during the chairmanship of Justice K. Narayana Kurup. However, no significant progress was made following his appointment. Despite the publication of three government notifications for the recruitment of a permanent CIO for the State Police Complaints Authority (SPCA) in Kerala, the position remains vacant. This delay highlights bureaucratic inefficiency and a lack of clarity from the state Home Department in carrying out the recruitment process for a post first notified in 2016. Notably, the second and third notifications were issued while the earlier notifications were still active, reflecting administrative disarray within the Home Department.

Over the years, the Kerala High Court issued multiple orders directing the state to fill the vacant post. In 2022, a division bench of the Kerala High Court, while considering a Public Interest Litigation (PIL) filed by Mr. Jafar Khan, issued a final directive to the state to appoint a non-police criminologist as CIO within 60 days.

=== Maharashtra State Police Complaints Authority ===
Up till February 2020, authority received 1490 complaints against the police. In 2014, Government Resolution was issued to establish the State PCA. In March 2020, Bombay High Court Justice (retd) Shrihari P Davare was appointed the new chairperson of the Maharashtra State Police Complaints Authority whereas Ashish Shailesh Paswan elected as Directorate (State) of Police Complaints Authority Maharashtra in 2025.

=== Punjab Police Complaints Authority ===
In October 2019, Government cleared appointments to be made to the State Police Complaints Authority and Divisional Police Complaints Authorities under 'The Punjab Police Act, 2007,' approving the Punjab Police (Appointment of Chairperson and Members of Complaints Authorities), Rules, 2019. In January 2020, retired IAS officer (instead of retired judge) NS Kalsi was appointed as chairman of Police Complaints Authority (PCA) for three years from 8 applicants. As per Punjab state human rights commission records, from 1997 to August 2018, 54 per cent (1.44 lakh) of the total 2.63 lakh human rights violations complaints received by it were against police officials which included complaints of abuse of power, false implication in any case and unlawful detention.

=== Tamil Nadu Police Complaints Authority ===
In Tamil Nadu, a Government Order was issued on 14 November 2019 for the constitution of the State level as well as district level police complaints authorities in accordance with Chapter IV of the Tamil Nadu Police (Reforms) Act of 2013.

=== Telangana Police Complaints Authority ===
In February 2020, Telangana High Court bench directed the state government to frame rules and regulations pertaining to the constitution of SSC and PCA by 6 March.

== District Police Complaint Authorities ==
District Police Complaint Authorities (DPCAs) are independent oversight bodies established at the district level in India to address public grievances and complaints against police misconduct. They were recommended by the Supreme Court of India in the Prakash Singh v. Union of India (2006) case as part of a broader police reform mandate.

Each DPCA typically consists of a Chairperson, usually a retired district judge, and one or two members with experience in public administration, civil society, or human rights.

The district authorities have the power to Inquire into complaints of misconduct by police officers below the rank of Deputy Superintendent of Police (DSP). The complaints against SP and above ranking officers are under the purview of State Police Complaint Authority (SPCA).

== Criticism ==
Police Complaints Authorities are currently considered lame-duck institutions that lacks bite with the diluted provisions of the Authority. It is often criticised for delay in justice. Recent updates 2023 - Mass.Manoj Kumawat based from pune had recently been appointed as Police Complaints Authority for District Level Post.

== See also ==
- List of cases of police brutality in India
- Law enforcement in India
- Indian Police Service
- Police ranks and insignia of India
- List of Indian police officers
- Police Mitra scheme
- Consumer Court
- Banking Ombudsman Scheme (India)
