= Babu Genu Said =

Indian independence activist

- Born: 1 January 1908; Mahalunge Padawal, Ambegaon taluka, Pune district, Bombay Presidency
- Died: 12 December 1930 (aged 22) Bombay, British India
- Other names: Hutatma Babu Genu
- Known for: Indian Independence Movement

Babu Genu Said (1 January 1908 – 12 December 1930) was an Indian mill-worker in Bombay who led protests against the trade practices of British companies in India.

Babu Genu Said was born in a poor farmer family in Mahalunge Padawal; he worked in a cotton mill in Bombay. He was a participant in the protests, organized by Indian independence activists, against the import of foreign-made cloth.

On 12 December 1930, George Frazier, a cloth merchant from Manchester based in India was moving foreign-made cloth from his shop in old Hanuman galli in the Fort region to Mumbai Port via truck. He was given police protection as per his request. The activists attempt move the truck, but the police forced the protesters aside and managed to get the truck moving. Near Bhangwadi on Kalbadevi Road, Babu Genu stood in front of the truck, shouting praises for Mahatma Gandhi. The police ordered the driver to drive the truck over Babu Genu, but the driver refused, saying: "I am Indian and he is also Indian, So, we both are the brothers of each other, then how can I murder my brother?". After that, the police drove the truck over Babu Genu and crushed him. This resulted in a huge wave of protests throughout Mumbai.

The landmarks bearing Hutatma Babu Genu's name include:

- Babu Genu Ground in Navi Mumbai, Maharashtra, India
- Babu Genu said Wadi, in Mahalunge Padwal, Pune District, Maharashtra, India
- Babu Genu Chowk, in Pune, Maharashtra, India
- Amar Shahid Babu Genu Marg in South Delhi, Delhi, India

The corner across KEM hospital in Parel, Mumbai is named after Babu Genu, with his bust on display as Hutatma Babu Genu

Hutatma Babu Genu Ganpati in Budhwar Peth, Pune, India. .

== See also ==
- List of cases of police brutality in India
