= 2015 sandalwood smugglers encounter in Andhra Pradesh =

2015 Andhra shootout
- Location of Chandragiri, Chittoor in Andhra Pradesh
- Location: Chandragiri Mandal; Chittoor District; Andhra Pradesh, India
- Date: 7 April 2015; 05:00 a.m. (local time) (UTC+05:30)
- Target: Red sanders smugglers
- Attack type: Shooting, encounter killing
- Weapon: Rifles
- Deaths: 20
- Perpetrator: Andhra Pradesh Police
- Motive: Punishment

On 7 April 2015, Andhra Pradesh Police shot twenty Tamil Red sandle smugglers in the Seshachalam forest in Chittoor District, Andhra Pradesh, India. Red Sanders Anti-Smuggling Task Force DIG Kantha Rao said that the smugglers attacked the team with sickles, rods and axes. Asked if the attack could have been quelled without such fatalities, Rao said, "We gave them several warnings but they did not stop attacking us. There were over a hundred of them." Asked how many of his men were grievously injured, he said, "Nobody is seriously hurt from our side. Their superior training saved their lives."

Human rights activists did not believe the police version of the shootings. They say some of the bodies had burn marks and others had bullet injuries in the chest and head. Witnesses said that some of those killed were pulled off a bus by the policemen.

== Incident ==
The incident occurred at two places Eetagunta in Seshachalam forest area of Chandragiri mandal in Chittoor. Nine labourers were killed in Eetagunta, eleven in Vachindou Banda. As per Andhra Pradesh Additional Director General of Police (Law and Order) R. P. Thakur, "Police had received information that a large number of smugglers were on the prowl in the forest. Teams of Red Sanders Task Force laid ambush at two places. The Task Force consisted of forest officials and armed reserve policemen too. When our teams asked them to surrender, the smugglers retaliated by hurling stones and they were armed with sickles and axes. When the task force opened fire, twenty of them were killed but many escaped. The smugglers were carrying red-sandalwood logs." According to reports, nearly 500 coolies, hired by a red sanders smuggler belonging to Chittoor district, were felling the trees when the police fired on them.

The accounts of two witnesses given before the National Human Rights Commission of India (NHRC) say "at least 12 of those shot dead were pulled off a bus by Andhra policemen and arrested hours before the controversial encounter".

== Investigation ==
The post-mortem team of five doctors at the Venkateswara Ramnarain Ruia Government Hospital, however, said the men "were shot at close range". On 10 April 2015, Hyderabad High Court ordered the Andhra Pradesh government to register a case of murder for the killing of 20 alleged red sandalwood smugglers. "Why should not a case of unnatural death under Section 302 of the Indian Penal Code be filed?" the court asked.

A fact-finding team led by the Coordination of Democratic Rights Organisation (CDRO), after visiting the spot on 11 April 2015, maintained that there were several inconsistencies in the version put forward by officials and termed the killing of 20 red sanders coolies as a 'fake encounter' and sought a Central Bureau of Investigation (CBI) inquiry into the issue. "There were no visible signs of conflict at the location. The distance between bodies of coolies is less than 10 feet and blood marks were not found elsewhere. It is surprising that there were no injuries, when the task force men have opened fire on a group of 150 coolies," they said.

Three men, who survived the alleged 'encounter' testified to the NHRC on how their friends and family members were wrongly detained and later shot dead.

An eight-member fact-finding team found instances where the bodies of some victims in the encounter were brutally disfigured and tortured. One of the members of this team and former member of NHRC, Satyabrata Pal, said that he has seen hundreds of cases while serving as a member in the NHRC for five years but rarely had he come across as brutal and as inhuman an act as the killings. Many members found this encounter is fake because it does not have any encounter signs.

On 17 April, Hyderabad High Court ordered the re-postmortem of five more victims and Saikumar of the alleged encounter, it also directed the Osmania Medical College principal to form a team of not less than three doctors to conduct the postmortems in Tamil Nadu.

National Commission for Scheduled Tribes (NCST) vice chairperson Ravi Thakur, visited the site, with forest department officials, where the 20 Tamil Nadu woodcutters were shot dead, and expressed dissatisfaction over the failure of officials in explaining the reason behind the massacre.

The NHRC decided to send its team for investigation where killing happened and favoured a judicial enquiry by Andhra Pradesh Government into firing incident.

The Hyderabad High Court had directed the Andhra Pradesh Police to furnish the case diary before the court, relating to the case registered in connection with the killing of the 20 people in police firing. Expressing dissatisfaction over the case diary that was produced by the investigating officer to the court, it ordered Special Investigation Team(SIT) to be constituted to probe the killing and wants SIT to complete its investigation in 60 days and submit a report to the court.

K. Kranthi Chaitanya, State executive member of the Andhra Pradesh Civil Liberties Committee (APCLC) stated that "We have always maintained that it was a fake encounter and that the workers were brought to the spot and killed. The forensic report, call data records, SIT report, etc. all prove our stand."

== Reaction ==
O. Panneerselvam, the Tamil Nadu Chief Minister in a letter to the Andhra Pradesh chief minister Chandrababu Naidu, called for a probe to fix responsibility for possible human rights violations. "Many of these persons are reportedly from Tiruvannamalai and Vellore districts of Tamil Nadu. While it is possible that these persons may have been engaged in illegal activities, the occurrence of such high casualties in the operation raises concerns whether the (AP) Task Force personnel acted with adequate restraint."

The Andhra Pradesh government has been ordered by the Hyderabad High Court to file a case that murder of 20 alleged red sandalwood smugglers. The incident exposed as an extrajudicial killing since an eyewitness claim that some of them were taken off from a bus and killed. It is mentioned that no security personnel was killed or injured that deny the police interview.

The killings sparked uproar in the victims' home state of Tamil Nadu. It brought protest outside Tamil Nadu among activists. They mentioned that the bodies had burn marks and bullet holes that implied that the men were shot at a close range.

The People's Union for Civil Liberties (PUCL) condemned the shootings and termed it a massacre. It also demanded the immediate registration of a FIR under charges of 'murder' and 'conspiracy to murder' against the officials who were responsible.

== See also ==
- 2009 Chitrakoot Shootout
- List of cases of police brutality in India
