= Bharat Bhushan Tiwari =

Indian social activist (died 2026)

Encounter of Bharat Bhushan Tiwari
- Location: 25°35′36.4″N 84°26′03.3″E; Belauthi, Shahpur, Bhojpur district, Bihar, India
- Date: 17 June 2026
- Attack type: Police encounter, shooting
- Deaths: (Bharat Bhushan Tiwari)
- Victims: Bharat Bhushan Tiwari, 28-year-old social activist
- Perpetrators: Bihar Police and Special Task Force (STF) personnel
- Inquiry: Judicial inquiry ordered by Bihar CM; investigation by DIG of Shahabad district
- Accused: Jagdishpur DSP, Shahpur SHO, and other police personnel
- Charges: Murder (FIR filed by family)

Bharat Bhushan Tiwari (c. 1998 – 17 June 2026) was an Indian student and social activist from Bhojpur district, Bihar. He gained national attention following his controversial death in a police encounter in June 2026. The incident, which was live-streamed on social media, sparked widespread protests and allegations of a staged killing, leading the Government of Bihar to order a judicial inquiry.

== Early life and activism ==
Tiwari was born in Belauthi village, located in the Shahpur police station area of Bhojpur district, Bihar, to a retired police driver, Shree Kashinath Tiwari, and Shreemati Asha Devi. He held a Bachelor of Science degree.

Locally, Tiwari was known as a public advocate and social worker. He frequently raised community issues before the district administration and was described by political leaders and local residents as a vocal supporter of marginalized groups, including Scheduled Castes, Scheduled Tribes, Other Backward Classes (OBC), and impoverished communities.

== Political response and investigations ==
On 17 June 2026, Shahpur Police, alongside the Special Task Force (STF), went to Tiwari's locality and asked for his surrender alleging that he was in possession of an unlicensed firearm. Subsequently, Tiwari came to the police and demanded that all the pending development projects of his village be completed. After a verbal agreement with a police officer, Tiwari threw the gun aside during a Facebook live stream and surrendered himself. After surrendering, the police shot him five times. He later died from his injuries. According to eye witnesses, police shot him three times on the spot and two times later in the police vehicle. The incident drew condemnation across the political spectrum. Opposition leader Tejashwi Yadav demanded an apology from the government regarding FIRs filed against Tiwari's family members. Ruling alliance members, including Janata Dal (United) leader Sanjay Jha and representatives from the Lok Janshakti Party (Ram Vilas), questioned the legitimacy of the encounter and demanded high-level investigations. Former Home Secretary of India Raj Kumar Singh visited Tiwari's family, calling for a fair probe and the withdrawal of cases registered against the protesters and the victim's relatives.

On 19 June 2026, in response to the mounting pressure, the Bihar Police suspended four officers present during the encounter, including a Station House Officer (SHO), Sub-Inspector, and Assistant Sub-Inspector. On 20 June, the Bihar government announced an independent judicial inquiry under the supervision of a retired High Court judge.

Additionally, a letter petition was filed before the Chief Justice of India by Supreme Court advocate Narendra Mishra, seeking suo motu cognizance of the case. The petition demanded the registration of a murder case against the involved officers, the transfer of the investigation to an independent agency such as the Central Bureau of Investigation (CBI) or a Special Investigation Team (SIT), and strict adherence to Supreme Court guidelines regarding police encounters.

== See also ==
- List of cases of police brutality in India
