= 1980 Bhagalpur blindings =

Blinding of individuals by Indian police in 1980

The Bhagalpur blindings refers to a series of incidents in 1979 and 1980 in Bhagalpur in the state of Bihar, India when police blinded 31 individuals under trial (or convicted criminals, according to some versions) by pouring acid into their eyes. The incident became infamous as the Bhagalpur blindings. The incident was widely discussed, debated and acutely criticised by several human rights organisations. The Bhagalpur blinding case had made criminal jurisprudence history by becoming the first in which the Indian Supreme Court ordered compensation for violation of basic human rights.

== Aftermath and response ==
On 2 December 1980, during a session of the Rajya Sabha, the issue was debated for over three hours. Members of the Opposition described the act as a barbaric attack by the police. Despite Prime Minister Indira Gandhi's expression of deep agony and the Home Minister's acceptance of responsibility, several Opposition parties staged a walkout, demanding a more action. The government announced an inquiry into the incident and Gandhi decide to give an ex-gratia payment of $2000 to each of the victims, though these measures were considered insufficient by many MPs.

== In popular culture ==
- The Bollywood movie Gangaajal is loosely based on this incident.
- In 2017 Amitabh Parashar released his documentary The Eyes of Darkness was based on this incident.

== See also ==
- List of cases of police brutality in India
