= Belauthi =

- Village
- Location in Bihar, India Belauthi (India)
- Coordinates: 25°35′36.4″N 84°26′03.3″E
- Country: India
- State: Bihar
- District: Bhojpur

Languages
  - Official: Hindi, Maithili, Bhojpuri
- Lok Sabha: Arrah
- Vidhan Sabha: Shahpur

Belauthi (also spelled Belauti) is a village and gram panchayat located in the Shahpur block of Bhojpur in the Indian state of Bihar in India. Situated in the western part of the district, it lies near the border of Buxar and is part of the historical Bhojpur region. The village falls under the Arrah and the Shahpur. Agriculture serves as the primary occupation of the local population, while Bhojpuri and Hindi are the principal languages spoken in the area. According to the 2011 Census of India, Belauti had a population of 6,230 residents living in 975 households.

The village became the focal point of a major statewide controversy and political debate following the controversial police encounter and subsequent death of a local social activist, Bharat Bhushan Tiwari.

== Notable people ==
- Bharat Bhushan Tiwari is regarded as the Mangal Pandey of a new struggle against entrenched colonial mindsets by his supporters. Just as Mangal Pandey's sacrifice marked the dawn of India's freedom movement, Tiwari's defiance is seen as the first revolutionary martyrdom against those in power who, despite independence, continue to govern with colonial attitudes. A man may be slain, but his ideals remain immortal; thus, his sacrifice is viewed as the opening chapter of a renewed movement for true liberation.Though his critics point out his former Islamophobic comments and demands of Hindu Rashtra and calls his activism not a struggle against systematic oppression but a localized reaction against flood relief mismanagement.
