= Avinash Chandra Vidyarthi =

Bhojpuri author

- Born: Arrah, Bihar
- Occupations: Poet; Author
- Writing career
- Notable work: Jai Bangla

Avinash Chandra Vidyarthi was a Bhojpuri author and poet. He was from Shahpur, near Arrah in Bhojpur District of Bihar. He has contributed significantly to Bhojpuri Literature. He was also one of the editors of Bhikhari Thakur Rachnavali, a compilations of Bhikhari Thakur works. His son Prakash Chandra is a physics teacher by occupation. They all live in Patna, Bihar.

== Works ==
- Jay Bangla
- Beta Ke Naihar (Essay)

=== Short story collection ===
- Daga Baji Gail

=== Poetry collection ===
- Anasail Raag
- Leela ee Shree Ram-Shyam ke

=== Essay collection ===
- Ghar ke gur
