= Shahpur, Bihar =

Shahpur
- Town
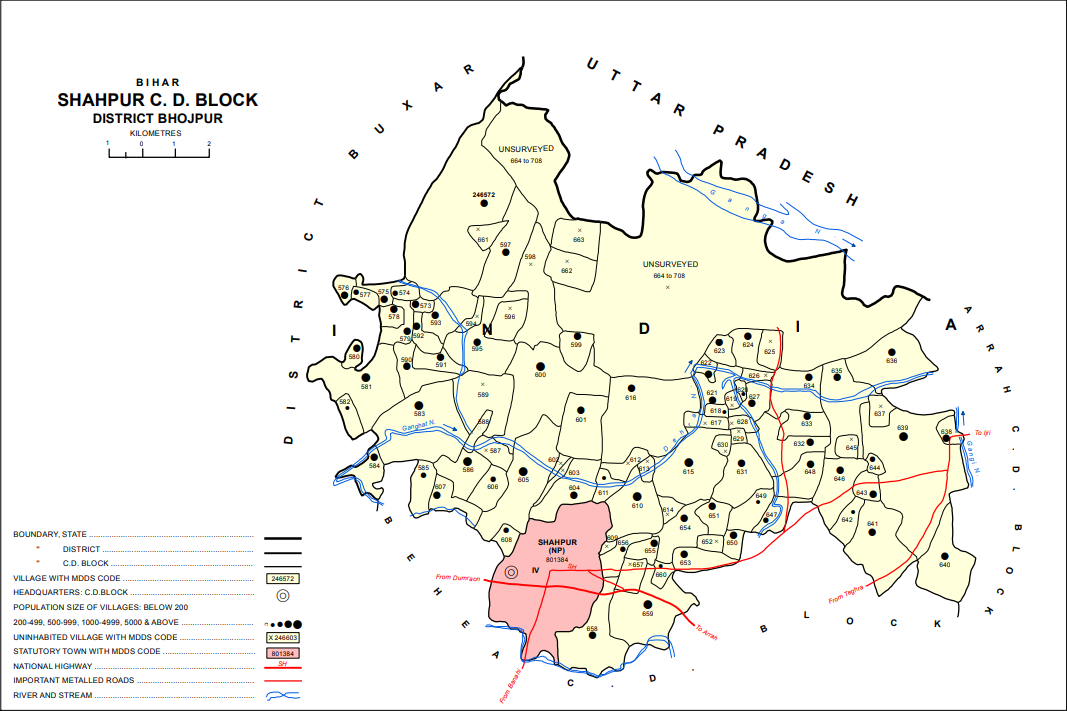
- Map of Shahpur in Shahpur block

- Location in Bihar, India Shahpur (India)
- Coordinates: 25.6°N 84.4°E
- Country: India
- State: Bihar
- District: Bhojpur
- Elevation: 51 m (167 ft)

Population (2011)
  - Total: 17,767

Language
  - Official: Hindi
  - Additional official: Urdu
  - Other: Bhojpuri
- Time zone: UTC+5:30 (IST)
- ISO 3166 code: IN-BR
- Vehicle registration: BR-03
- Website: bhojpur.bih.nic.in

Shahpur is a town and a notified area in Bhojpur district in the Indian state of Bihar.

== Geography ==
Shahpur is located at 25.58°N 84.45°E. It has an average elevation of 51 metres (167 feet).

== Demographics ==
Historical population
Year	Pop.	±%
1981	9,307	—
1991	11,254	+20.9%
2001	14,469	+28.6%
2011	17,767	+22.8%
Source: 2011 Census of India

As of the 2011 Indian Census, Shahpur had a total population of 17,767, of which 9,182 were males and 8,585 were females. Population within the age group of 0 to 6 years was 2,809. The total number of literates in Shahpur was 10,521, which constituted 59.2% of the population with male literacy of 67.9% and female literacy of 49.9%. The effective literacy rate of 7+ population of Shahpur was 70.3%, of which male literacy rate was 80.7% and female literacy rate was 59.3%. The Scheduled Castes and Scheduled Tribes population was 2,348 and 135 respectively. Shahpur had 2734 households in 2011.

As of 2001 India census, Shahpur had a population of 14,456. Males constitute 52% of the population and females 48%. Shahpur has an average literacy rate of 47%, lower than the national average of 59.5%: male literacy is 58%, and female literacy is 34%. In Shahpur, 19% of the population is under 6 years of age.

== Administration ==
The Shahpur assembly constituency covers Shahpur community development block; and Ishwarpura, Sarna, Suhinya, Barishwan, Chamarpur, Govindpur Tola, Belwati, Maharja, Kundeshar, Karisath, Semariya, hariharpur, sonbarasa, Beheya, chaurasta, Itawa, Bharauli, Gopalpur, Ranisagar, Karnamepur, Ramdthi, Banahi, Baghi, Diha, Gaura, Sikariya, Maniyara, Dhamwal and Kauria.

This town is alternatively spelled as Shahpurpatti. The town comes between Ara and Buxar National Highway NH 922

== Villages ==
Shahpur block contains the following 137 villages:

Village name	Total land area (hectares)	Population (in 2011)
Isharpura	1,061	4,254
Milki Gopalpur	18	1,254
Mansinghpur	52	774
Bhimpatti	65	1,961
Dharmangatpur	49	1,429
Dhiratpura	34	793
Dilmanpur	38	1,291
Bansipur	85	1,220
Mahuar Inglish	32	2,198
Deomalpur	390	6,773
Karanpura	58	214
Sarna	514	5,568
Tikthi	110	1,117
Lashkara	113	833
Bharauli	151	5,432
Rajauli	74	0
Nathpae	36	127
Baharwar	287	0
Ramdatahi	137	3,131
Khutaha	80	3,303
Karnamenpur	65	4,402
Ramchandar Semaria	133	2,854
Bhikhampur	38	0
Parsonda	253	1,967
Kazi Chak	120	0
Sonbarsa	308	3,070
Chaki Nauranga	343	0
Sonki	87	1,314
Suhiya	524	6,550
Harkhi Pipra	240	3,136
Dhokaria Chak	19	0
Kunriya	25	0
Lilari	217	2,294
Sahjauli	437	5,498
Domariya	113	915
Maharaja	114	1,397
Misrauliya	48	759
Mansa Chak	15	0
Semariya Palti Ojha	255	5,788
Panrepur	61	416
Bhainsaha	59	0
Patti Siswa	29	0
Bishunpur	46	0
Barsaun	365	8,586
Bahoranpur Dakhinwar	614	2,326
Parsram-patti	41	0
Barmhapa	28	446
Gabindpur	21	0
Gobindpur	17	454
Chamarpur	121	1,822
Lachhmanpur	38	1,067
Khagraha	47	3,201
Tikapur	106	3,439
Basdeopur	66	0
Jagaurh	47	0
Gaura	89	4,885
Manoharpur	33	0
Lat	25	0
Mahapur	32	0
Bimari	223	1,676
Karja	237	3,453
Parariya	107	1,454
Paharpur	207	1,822
Char Ghat	285	4,143
Chanchar	318	1,216
Gosainpur	51	0
Ramdihra	47	1,903
Jhaua	882	11,459
Pakri	288	1,645
Dumariya	359	3,265
Raksaur	74	252
Dhauri	61	1,724
Bhim Patti	28	893
Parsotimpur	46	0
Kharaun	173	3,139
Keotiya	81	548
Chanda	151	1,803
Abatana	108	346
Garaya	45	1,210
Dewaich Kundi	77	1,281
Bamhnauli	37	0
Nargada	99	1,226
Hariharpur	148	2,253
Dudh Ghat	60	1,285
Gashainpur	83	834
Beas Chak	73	0
Randa Dih	302	1,808
Belauthi	384	6,230
Bishunpur	38.4	317
Jagdeopur	64	0
ChakkiNaurangaMasumeRasulpur Ramkarhi	139	0
ChakkiNaurangaMahazRashulpur	140	0
Nandpur (Unsurveyed)	0	0
Gangapur (Unsurveyed)	0	0
Bhusahula (Unsurveyed)	0	0
Goreriya (Unsurveyed)	0	0
Pursotampur (Unsurveyed)	0	0
Damodarpur (Unsurveyed)	0	9,931
Jawania (Unsurveyed)	0	1,146
Sarangpur (Unsurveyed)	0	903
Lachatola Bersingha (Unsurveyed)	0	3,223
Bahoranpur Bazar (Unsurveyed)	0	0
Bahoranpur Diara (Unsurveyed)	0	0
Bishunpur (Unsurveyed)	0	0
Chicharampur (Unsurveyed)	0	0
Isharpura Naubarar (Unsurveyed)	0	0
Mohji Nardarai (Unsurveyed)	0	0
Nardara Khas	0	0
Nipania (Unsurveyed)	0	0
ChakkiNaurangaOjhwaliaDiara	0	0
Parsotimpur (Unsurveyed)	0	805
Pipra Ganesh (Unsurveyed)	0	0
Repura (Unsurveyed)	0	0
Sobhanathhi (Unsurveyed)	0	0
Sonbarsa Diar (Unsurveyed)	0	0
Sugar Chapra (Unsurveyed)	0	0
Udhopur (Unsurveyed)	0	0
Zamin Fazil (Unsurveyed)	0	0
Salempur Diara (Unsurveyed)	0	0
Salempur Mahazi (Unsurveyed)	0	0
ChakkiNaurangaMasumeMahaziRam Karhi	0	0
Udhopur (Unsurveyed)	0	0
Tika Semaria (Unsurveyed)	0	0
Mahazi Dokti (Unsurveyed)	0	0
Ram Dayal Ka Dera (Unsurveyed)	0	155
Mirchaiya Ka Dera (Unsurveyed)	0	1,328
Lalu Ahir Ka Dera (Unsurveyed)	0	2,413
Lachhmi Ahir Ka Dera (Unsurveyed)	0	702
Kadam Ka Dera (Unsurveyed)	0	697
Nandlal Ka Dera (Unsurveyed)	0	346
Kariman Thakur Ka Dera (Unsurveyed)	0	760
Pachkauri Ka Dera (Unsurveyed)	0	331
Tapsi Ka Dera (Unsurveyed)	0	428
Madhopur (Unsurveyed)	0	1,755
Saiya Ka Dera (Unsurveyed)	0	617
Ram Karhi (Unsurveyed)	0	629
Suremarpur (Unsurveyed)	0	2,038

== Utilities ==
As of 2011, Shahpur has one of three rural power substations in Bhojpur district, with the other two being at Koilwar and Bihiya.

== Notable places ==
This city is known as "Town Of Temples". "Mahavira Sthan", "Kundeswar Dham" "kudwa shiv at Gosainpur" "Gharghbarni mai" are some of the major temples. It is considered to be very holy for Hindus and the temple compound hosts a number of fairs.

== Notable people ==
- Avinash Chandra Vidyarthi, Bhojpuri Poet
- Bharat Bhushan Tiwari is regarded as the Mangal Pandey of a new struggle against entrenched colonial mindsets.
