= 2008 Haveri police shooting =

Mass shooting in Haveri

- Date: 10 June 2008
- Location: Haveri district, Karnataka, India
- Cause: Protests over shortage of subsidized fertilizers
- Perpetrator: Karnataka Police
- Deaths: 2
- Injuries: Dozens reported

The 2008 Haveri police shooting was an incident that occurred on 10 June 2008 in Haveri district in the Indian state of Karnataka, when police opened fire on farmers protesting shortages of subsidized fertilizers during the pre-monsoon sowing season. Two protesters, Siddalingappa Churi and Puttappa Honnati, were killed, and several others were injured in the firing. The event triggered widespread protests across Karnataka and drew political scrutiny toward the state government led by B. S. Yediyurappa.

== Background ==
The protests were rooted in a broader fertilizer supply crisis affecting Karnataka during the 2008 kharif agricultural season. Farmers reported acute shortages of key inputs such as diammonium phosphate (DAP) and urea, which were critical for rain-fed agriculture. According to state and central government figures, Karnataka received significantly less fertilizer than its projected requirement, contributing to delayed sowing and rising costs for rural cultivators.

In the days leading up to the incident, farmer unions and local cultivators had gathered near the Agricultural Produce Market Committee (APMC) office in Haveri town, organizing marches and road blockades to demand immediate government intervention. The demonstrators called for the release of fertilizer stocks through cooperative societies and accused officials and private dealers of mismanagement and profiteering.

Authorities initially used lathi charges and tear gas to disperse demonstrators. According to official and media reports, the situation deteriorated after some protesters allegedly began pelting stones and attempting to damage police vehicles, prompting officers to resort to live firing to restore order.

== Aftermath ==
The two men killed in the shooting were declared dead at the scene, while the injured were initially treated at a government hospital in Haveri and later transferred to the Karnataka Institute of Medical Sciences in Hubballi for advanced care. Contemporary reports estimated that dozens of protesters required medical attention for bullet and baton injuries. The incident drew condemnation from opposition parties and farmer organizations, who demanded a judicial inquiry and compensation for the victims’ families.

== See also ==
- Agriculture in Karnataka
- List of cases of police brutality in India
