= List of Indian police officers =

This is a list of Indian police officers.

Name	Acclamation	Highest Rank	State	Notes
B. B. Ashok Kumar	Veerapan Mission, Bangalore Underworld, Black Market, Drug and Mafia Undercover Operation	ACP	Karnataka	Awarded three President of India Gold Medals.
Vinod Chaubey	Naxal urban network exposure	SP	Chhattisgarh	Kirti Chakra, President's Medal for meritorious services
H. T. Sangliana	Suppressed culprits by disguising himself.	DG & IGP	Karnataka	Former MP. Police Service Portrayed in Kannada movies of same name.
K. Vijay Kumar	Veerapan Mission	DGP*	Tamil Nadu	
Kempaiah	Tracked Rajiv Gandhi's assassin	ADGP	Karnataka	
M. L. Kumawat	Terrorist and Naxalite Operation	DG	Andhra Pradesh	
Rakesh Maria	2003 Gateway of India Blasts	CP	Mumbai	
Amitabh Thakur	Transparency and accountability in administration, Police reforms	IGP	Uttar Pradesh	Given Compulsory retirement.
Ranjit Shekhar Mooshahary	NSG, BSF	DG	Meghalaya	
Sanjeev Tripathi	Traced Sikh Separatists	Director, RAW	New Delhi	
Shankar Bidari	Bangalore City, Veerapan Mission (Intelligence)	DG & IGP	Karnataka	
Pradeep Sharma	Mumbai Underworld	Inspector	Maharashtra	
Vijay Salaskar	26/11 Mumbai Attacks	Sr Inspector	Maharashtra	
Chandrappa	Veerappan Mission	ACP	Karnataka	Sole survivor of the Hogenakkal shootout.
Prakash Singh	PLI filled by him in SC for police reforms in India. Landmark judgement of SCI in police reforms in India.	DGP	Uttar Pradesh	
S. K. Umesh	Bengaluru City, Underworld, Veerappan Mission	SP	Karnataka	Official Website
Manoj Kumar Sharma		IGP	Maharashtra	Life portrayed in 12th Fail movie
Dhanushkodi Sivanandhan	Mumbai	Commisioner Mumbai and DGP	Maharshtra	
Mahesh Narayan Singh	Mumbai	Commissioner		
Basavaraj Malagatti	Bengaluru City, Underworld	DCP	Karnataka	News Articles
D. V. Guruprasad	Hubli City, State Intelligence	IGP	Karnataka	Authored Numerous Books in Kannada and English

* refers to the current rank of the police officer

== See also ==
- Indian Police Service
