= 2009 Chitrakoot shootout =

Small conflict event in 2009

2009 Chitrakoot Shootout
- Location: Chitrakoot village, Jamauli, Uttar Pradesh, India
- Date: Tuesday, 17 June 2009; 11 am (Indian Standard Time)
- Attack type: Shootout
- Weapons: Grenades, SLR, Rifles
- Deaths: 5 (4 officers, 1 perpetrator)
- Injuries: 14+
- Perpetrator: Ghanshyam Nishad

A shootout took place on 17 June 2009 between the Indian dacoit Ghanshyam Nishad alias Naam and 400 members of the local police force of the Chitrakoot village in Jamauli in Uttar Pradesh. An initial force of 3 constables who attempted to arrest Nishad were stuck in the same building with him and one of them was killed. The 48-hour siege ended on 19 June with 5 dead including the perpetrator.

== Background ==
Ghanshyam Nishad had been on the run for many years and the government had put up a 50,000 bounty on his capture. Nishad also headed a gang that operated in Uttar Pradesh and Madhya Pradesh and was wanted for various crimes including murder and abductions.

== Standoff ==
The standoff began when the Special Operation Group of Chitrakoot Police received a tip that Nishad was in the village of Jamauli for the birthday of his relative Raj Karan Nishad. When police raided the village at 11 am on Tuesday, Ghanshyam hid in a house and fired at them. Armed with grenades and rifles, he managed to kill a constable, Shameem, and injured another two operatives. By evening, the entire village was evacuated. The under-equipped police had to stall their operations on Wednesday night due to a lack of night-vision equipment.

On Wednesday, Nishad shot dead PAC company commander Bani Madhav Singh and Mohd Iqbal, the driver of DIG Chitrakoot. He also injured the IG, DIG and the STF in-charge. More than a dozen policemen, including two senior officers, were injured in the exchange of bullets. Inspector General (IG) of the PAC B.K. Gupta and Deputy Inspector General (DIG) of Banda range S.K. Singh were injured on Wednesday afternoon and were rushed to Allahabad by helicopter. Police later burned nearby thatch houses in an attempt to flush him with smoke. He was seen changing houses twice, but the police were unable to stop him. He was finally shot dead on 19 June.
