= Murders of P. Jayaraj and J. Bennix =

Deaths in custody in India

- Date: June 19–23, 2020
- Time: 7:45 PM IST, UTC+05:30
- Location: Sathankulam, Thoothukudi, Tamil Nadu, India
- Deaths: P. Jayaraj (age 59); J. Bennix (age 31)
- Inquest: Three doctors conducted post-mortem in the presence of the judicial magistrate. The entire procedure was video-recorded.
- Arrests: Sreedhar; Balakrishnan; Raghu Ganesh; Murugan; Muthu Raja; Samadurai; Chelladurai; Thomas Francis; Veilumuthu; Pauldurai (died of Covid August 2020)
- Convicted: Sreedhar; Balakrishnan; Raghu Ganesh; Murugan; Muthu Raja; Samadurai; Chelladurai; Thomas Francis; Veilumuthu
- Trial: Started on 18th February 2021
- Verdict: 6 April 2026
- Sentence: Death
- Reason for arrest: Wrong confinement of Lockdown Violation

The arrest of shopkeepers P. Jayaraj (59 years old) and his son J. Bennix (also spelled Fennix, Benniks) (31 years old) by the Tamil Nadu Police in Sathankulam, Thoothukudi district on 19 June 2020 and their subsequent sexual and physical abuse in custody resulted in their deaths three days later. The incident sparked strikes and protests by Sathankulam shopkeepers against police brutality, attracting significant media coverage and celebrity attention. The incident shone a light on the impunity of provincial policing in Tamil Nadu; the complicity of the courts in turning a blind eye to police corruption; the involvement of the members of the community policing initiative "Friends of the Police" in acts of police brutality; and the negligence of doctors conducting medical inspections of detainees. In response to the outrage compensation was paid to affected family members; nine police officers were arrested, the remainder transferred to new locations, government support for the Friends of the Police organisation revoked, and an inquiry into the event handed over to the Central Bureau of Investigation. On 6 April 2026 sessions court judge G Muthukumaran awarded the death penalty to all 9 convicted police officers.

== Arrest and custodial deaths ==
=== Friday, 19 June ===
On 19 June 2020, at 7:30 pm Jayaraj was arrested at his workshop in Kamarajar Chowk by Sub-Inspector Balakrishnan, Inspector S Sridhar, Police Constable M. Muthuraja and other officials following an argument with police over allegations of violating COVID restrictions on trading hours (some reports state that their shop was open 15 minutes after curfew).

Between 7:30 and 7:45pm, Jayaraj's son Bennix, who had a mobile stand near the Kamarajar statue, was told of his father's arrest, and went to the police station with a friend. Bennix was called in by the police while he was waiting outside. Once inside, he saw his father being pushed to the floor by Sub inspector Balakrishnan and beaten resulting in an altercation between Bennix and Balakrishnan and police constable M. Muthuraja. The police subsequently confined Bennix inside the police station, and commenced beating him along with his father from 7:45pm, denying access to lawyers and friends who had gathered outside the police station. These witnesses reported that they heard the police shout "How you dare speak against the police".

The Central Bureau of Investigation chargesheet would state that the door of the police station was locked, with both Jayaraj and Bennix being subjected to several rounds of beatings and torture from 7:45 pm and 3 am the next day. The first round continued until 9:45pm. Eyewitness would later report that violence inside the police station escalated after 11:30pm when Sub-Inspector Raghu Ganesh arrived. As per the CBI investigation, whenever there was a silence, the inspector used to urge the staff by asking about reasons for silence and thereby instigating them to start fresh rounds of beating. Police volunteers present inside the station also allegedly started assaulting the duo. During the ordeal, the clothes of victims were removed to add to the brutality of torture. DNA samples from the blood splatters on the walls and floor of the room would later provide evidence of the brutal beating.

=== Saturday, 20 June ===
On the morning of 20 June, the police took Jayaraj and Bennix to Kovilpatti Hospital for medical fitness testing. In spite of requiring a change of six lungis due to the profuse bleeding from their rectums, a medical fitness certificate was provided by Doctor Vennila.

After that, they were taken to Sathankulam Magistrate D Saravanan, who remanded the injured duo in custody without examining their physical condition or speaking with them directly as the result of COVID protocols. D. Saravanan came out and stood at the balcony of his house when the team of police were standing around Jayaraj and Bennix at the entrance. Without following the protocol to examine for potential police brutality, D.Saravanan waved his hands to the police to take them away. The two victims were subsequently taken to Kovilpatti sub-jail, located 100km from Sathankulam. Lawyers were not allowed to meet Bennix or his father until the evening of 20 June.

=== Sunday-Tuesday, 21-23 June ===
On 22 June 2020, while Bennix was undergoing treatment at Government Hospital, Kovilpatti, he died at 9:00 pm, due to heavy internal bleeding. P. Jayaraj was admitted at Government Hospital, Kovilpatti by the authorities of Sub Jail, Kovilpatti on the same day at 10:30 pm. At 4:30am on the following day, P. Jayaraj died while undergoing treatment for a punctured lung.

The same evening of Jayaraj's death protests began amongst Sathankulam shopkeepers and the public began, spreading to the rest of Tamil Nadu the following day and resulting in the first media coverage of the incident.

== Response to the incident ==
=== Police response ===
Following protests and media coverage of the deaths, on 24 June, the Police Department suspended two sub inspectors and an inspector and transferred all Sathankulam police to other locations.

=== Intervention by the Madras High Court ===
In response to public outrage, the Madurai bench of Madras High Court took suo motu cognizance of the matter and on 24 June, a bench consisting of Justices P.N. Prakash and B. Pugalendhi called the Superintendent of Police, Thoothukudi before the court. The court ordered the Superintendent to inquire into the incident and submit an interim status report within two days. The order included a requirement to videograph the autopsy, which was to be done by a panel of three experts in the presence of a magistrate after the police completed its inquest proceedings.

Copies of both reports of the autopsy and inquest were submitted to the high court. The State Human Rights Commission Tamil Nadu took suo motu cognizance of the offence and asked the Police Department to file a reply in this regard.

=== Reaction on social media ===
” Reeling from what I'm hearing. Absolutely stunned, sad, and angry. No human being deserves such brutality, whatever be their crime. The guilty must not be allowed to go unpunished. We need facts. I cannot even begin to imagine what the family must be going through. Sending strength and prayers. We need to use our collective voices to seek #JusticeForJayarajandBennicks”

— Priyanka Chopra wrote on Twitter

Celebrities, politicians, and several notable people used social media to reveal the details of the attack and condemn the police action. Within three days of the deaths hundreds of thousands of tweets were sent out using the hashtag "#JusticeforJayarajandBennix", which was among the top Twitter topics trending in India on 26 June 2020 and among the top 30 trending globally. Celebrities, including Ravichandran Ashwin, Shikhar Dhawan, Suchitra, Siddharth, Khushbu, Jayam Ravi, Karthik Subbaraj, D. Imman, Suriya used the hashtag. Jignesh Mevani, a social activist and lawyer from Gujarat in western India, wrote on Twitter that "The George Floyd of India are far too many". Film director Hari issued a statement condemning police brutality and expressing regret for glorifying policemen in five of his films.

=== Government response ===
Kanimozhi, Member of Parliament, Lok Sabha for the Thoothukudi Constituency said the incident was a collective failure of police and other officials and a gross violation of human rights. On 24 June 2020, Edappadi K. Palaniswami issued a public statement stating that Jayaraj and his son Bennix had died due to illness. On 25 June 2020, Palaniswami announced a solatium of ₹10 lakh each to their family and stated that a government job would be provided to one family member of the deceased. On 28 June, Tamil Nadu Chief Minister Palaniswami directed that the inquest into the deaths be handed over to the CBI.

=== Judicial inquiry ===
” What has happened in Tamil Nadu’s Thoothukudi district is worse than the Nirbhaya case for which four persons involved were hanged early this year. ”

— Retired Judge of Supreme Court of India Markandey Katju wrote on The Week

During the pendency of the autopsy inquiry, Magistrate M S Bharathidasan submitted a report to the High Court describing rude behaviour by Constable Maharajan at the Sathankulam police station. In the report, the Magistrate said Constable Maharajan made a “very disparaging remark” against him in the presence of D Kumar, Additional Superintendent of Police and C Prathapan, Deputy Superintendent of Police, even as policemen at the station recorded the videos of the proceeding.

Following the complaint, the Madurai Bench of Madras High Court began a suo motu contempt of court proceeding and ordered the Inspector General of Police for the South Zone to take action against the officers. The Inspector General suspended Maharajan; D Kumar, ADSP, and C Prathapan, DSP was moved to a waiting list. The High Court also directed the Thoothukudi district collector to depute revenue officials and take control of the police station to enable the magistrate to collect the necessary documents. This incident represents the first time in the history of Indian Police that a district administration had seized control of a police station. The judges further directed the Additional Director of Forensic Sciences department to send a team of experts to collect materials from the station.

== CBI Investigation ==
Central Bureau of Investigation had registered two cases on 7 July 2020 related to the allegations of custodial death. On the request of Tamil Nadu Government & further notification from Govt of India, and taken over the investigation of both the cases, earlier registered vide Crime no. 649 & 650 at Police Station Kovilpatti. A CBI team camped continuously at Madurai and worked in the case during COVID-19 pandemic. During the investigation 10 police officials including Inspector/SHO, 3 Sub inspector, 2 HC, 4 Constables, all of Sathankulam Police Station were arrested. The CBI had filed a chargesheet on 26 September 2020 against all arrested police officials U/s 120-B of IPC r/w sections 302, 342, 201, 182, 193, 211, 218 & 34 & substantive offences. One more accused, Sub Inspector Palthurai died during investigation due to COVID-19.

== Court verdicts ==
The case was a rare one where the police officers, who were obligated to maintain law and order, had themselves acted against the law and brutally assaulted the father and son, who did not have any criminal case against them.

— the presiding judge, G. Muthukumaran.

On 23 March 2026, a special court in Madurai convicted all 9 police personnel involved in the case. On 6 April 2026, the First Additional District and Sessions Court in Madurai sentenced nine police personnel to death. The court also ordered the officers to collectively pay compensation amounting to ₹1.40 crore to the family of the deceased.

== Aftermath ==
On 23 June 2020, members of the public staged a road blockade in Sathankulam, demanding that murder charges be registered against Sub-Inspectors Balakrishnan and Pauldurai. Anita R. Radhakrishnan, the MLA for Tiruchendur, participated in the protest and supported the demand. M. K. Stalin, then Leader of the Opposition, sought an explanation from Chief Minister Edappadi K. Palaniswami. K. S. Alagiri, president of the Tamil Nadu Congress Committee, called for an inquiry by the Central Bureau of Investigation. On 1 July 2020, Stalin criticised Palaniswami for his earlier statement that the two had died due to illness, alleging that the remark suppressed facts surrounding the deaths. On 8 July 2020, the Office of the Additional Chief Secretary issued an order disbanding the Friends of Police movement in the whole of Tamil Nadu.

== See also ==
- Police brutality
- List of cases of police brutality in India
