= Mahalunge Padawal =

Village in Maharashtra

- Village
- Location within Maharashtra Location within India
- Coordinates: 18.893°N 74.082°E
- Country: India
- State: Maharashtra
- District: Pune district
- Tehsil: Ambegaon

Government
  - Type: Panchayati raj (India)
  - Body: Gram panchayat

Languages
  - Official: Marathi
  - Other spoken: Hindi
- Time zone: UTC+5:30 (IST)
- Telephone code: 02114
- ISO 3166 code: IN-MH
- Vehicle registration: MH-14
- Website: pune.nic.in

Mahalunge Padawal is a village in Ambegaon taluka of Pune district in the state of Maharashtra, India.The village is administrated by a Sarpanch who is an elected representative of village as per constitution of India and Panchayati raj (India).
