= Killing of Moinul Haque =

Labourer killed in Assam, India

- Location: Sipajhar, Assam, India
- Date: September 23, 2021
- Attack type: gun shooting
- Weapon: Gun
- Deaths: 1

On 23 September 2021, Moinul Haque, a 33-year-old wage labourer, was shot and killed by police in Sipajhar, in the Darrang district of Assam, India.

== Background ==
On the night of September 19, villagers in Dholpur, Assam were served an eviction notice, which asked them to vacate the area by the next morning. The villagers staged a peaceful protest against the eviction.

== Aftermath ==
The state government of Assam has initiated an investigation, to be overseen by a retired High Court judge, into the violence that occurred on Thursday. The cameraman Bijay Bonia, responsible for the fatal attack, has been apprehended and remanded to judicial custody for 14 days by a local court.

Some 800 families were displaced during the operation to remove encroachments at Dholpur since Monday. The state aims to reclaim 4,500 bighas of government land for an agricultural initiative. According to the police, the locals pelted them with stones, leading to the use of necessary force.
