= Police Mitra scheme =

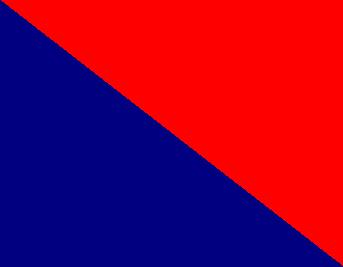
- Country: India
- Prime Minister(s): Narendra Modi
- Ministry: Ministry of Home Affairs (India)
- Key people: Amit Shah
- Launched: 2015; New Delhi
- Status: Active
- Website: satarapolice.gov.in/PoliceMitra

Police Mitra or Friends of Police is an initiative of the State police in different states of India. Civilian citizens having 'good social record' like ex-army men, students, advocates and housewives are responsible in tying up with the police beat staff to look after the law and order, traffic and crowd management, safety of women prevention of crime and informing about suspected elements around their area. The arm bands and ID cards provided to police mitras give them the authority to help the police in fighting crime without any salary. Police Mitra Kaksh (Police Mitra Centers) were also set up in Haryana. Police Mitras also assist Government Railway Police (Mumbai). Police Mitras are also used in maintaining peace in disturbed areas by police department.

== Recruitment ==
Under Police Mitra scheme, any Indian citizen can volunteer by visiting the police web portal, filling a form, and selecting one or more than one of the 23 options, which include checking crime, environment conservation, helping in social media topics, enhancing awareness on human rights and awareness on anti-social elements. The police mitra should be over 18 years of age and must not be a member of a political party as well as he/she should not have any past record of anti-social activity.

== Controversy ==
According to Abhishek Jain, research assistant at Rajiv Gandhi Institute for Contemporary Studies, Police mitras being an extrajudicial force like erstwhile Special Police Officers (SPO) can be misused for surveillance and gathering intelligence on minorities and traditionally marginalised communities further intensifying mistrust. In February 2020, a police mitra was arrested for extortion case at Pune. In January 2020, Supriya Sharma in Scroll.in reported police mitras in Uttar Pradesh were mostly members of particular political outfits after they baton charged protesters.

== See also ==
- Neighborhood watch
- Community policing
- Ministry of Home Affairs (India)
- Law enforcement in India
- Police Complaints Authority (India)
- Indian Police Foundation and Institute
- Digital India
- Pradhan Mantri Jan Dhan Yojana
- Skill India
