= Friends of Police =

Community policing initiative

The Friends of Police (FoP) was a community policing initiative in Tamil Nadu. The movement was founded by in 1993 by Philip V. Prateep, as Superintendent of police in Ramanathapuram district. In 1994, the initiative received official sanction by the state government and expanded state-wide. The government revoked all official support for the program in July 2020 following the alleged involvement of Friends of Police members in two custodial deaths at the hands of the police. FoP responded by stating that none of their registered members were involved in the case. Referring to media reports about some unauthorized persons infiltrating into FoP with fake identity cards, FOP said appropriate legal action would be initiated against such suspects who were tarnishing the “fair name” of the organization.
