= Pradeep Sharma =

Pradeep Sharma may refer to:

- Pradeep Sharma (academic), Indian-American engineer and materials scientist
- Pradeep Sharma (police officer) (born 1961), Indian former police officer
- Pradeep Nirankarnath Sharma, Indian former civil servant
