= Beemapally =

- neighborhood
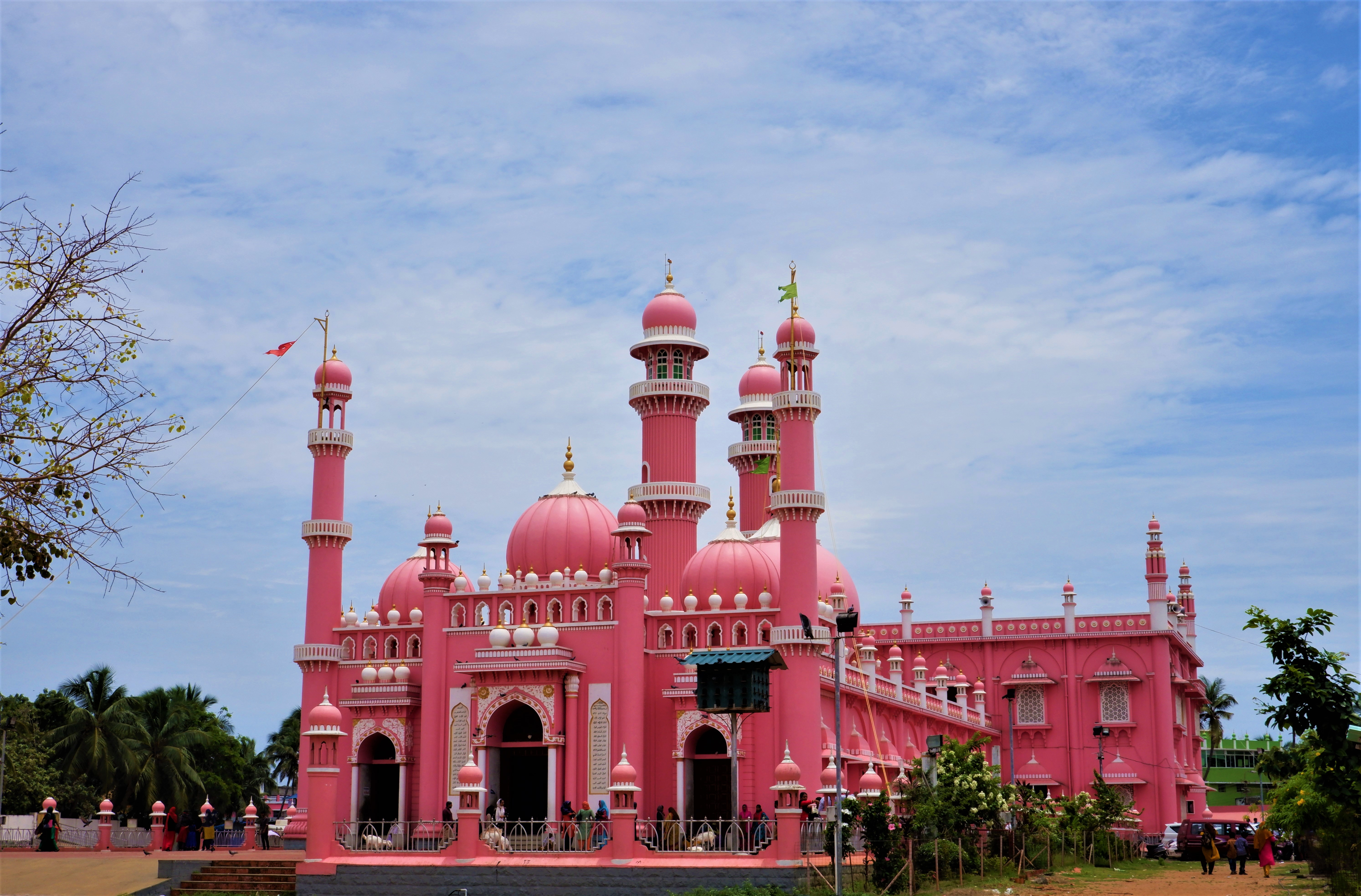
- Interactive map of Beemapally
- Coordinates: 8.495945°N 76.954381°E
- Country: India
- State: Kerala
- District: Thiruvananthapuram

Government
  - Type: City Corporation
  - Body: Thiruvananthapuram Corporation

Languages
  - Official: Malayalam, English
- Time zone: UTC+5:30 (IST)
- PIN: 695008
- Telephone code: 0471
- Vehicle registration: KL-01
- Architect: G. Gopalakrishnan

Beemapally is a region within the city of Thiruvananthapuram in the state of Kerala, India. Beemapally is famous for its mosque, Beemapally Dargah Shareef, which houses the tomb of Syedunnisa Beema Beevi, a woman believed to have divine powers, and her son Syedu Shuhada Maheen Abubacker. Every year, Uroos is held in the name of Maheen (RA), the son of Beema Beevi(RA).which attracts thousands of pilgrims from all faiths and castes. The tomb of Beema Beevi, the lady with miraculous powers who is believed to belong to the Prophet Mohammed’s family, is located at the mosque.

== Inauguration ==
Quaid-E-Millat M. Muhammad Ismail, the first president of Indian Union Muslim League, laid the foundation stone of Beemapally Mosque. The design and construction of the mosque were executed by G. Gopalakrishnan, a famous architect who designed over 100 mosques in the state of Kerala.

== Annual Urus ==
Beemapally Mosque is famous for its annual urus, which attracts scores of pilgrims from all walks of life. The festival, which marks the death anniversary of Syedunnisa Beema Beevi, starts on the first day of Islamic month Jumada al-Akhir (Arabic: جُمَادَىٰ ٱلْآخِر, romanized: Jumādā al-ʾĀkhir) and continues for the next ten days. The celebration begins with the hoisting of the customary flag of the mosque in front of the elders and other devotees. The devotees carry money in pots adorned with flowers and incense sticks. The pot’s opening is swathed in white cloth, and a garland is fastened around the neck. The pots are daubed with sandal paste, which is why the festival is called Chandanakudam (sandal pot). Many religious discussions are held in the mosque, art forms like duffmuttu are performed, and Islamic devotional songs are performed outside the mosque. On the final day of Chandanakudam Mahotsavam, a flag from Beema Bibi’s grave is taken; there is a grand procession with caparisoned elephants and the music of the panchavadyam (five instruments).
