= Batak Mian =

Cook who saved Mahatma Gandhi

- Born: 1880; Motihari, Bihar, British India
- Died: 1957 (aged 76–77); Bihar, India
- Occupation: Cook or chef
- Known for: Refusing to poison Mahatma Gandhi during Champaran Satyagraha
- Honors: Publicly honored by President Rajendra Prasad in 1950

Batak Mian Ansāri, was a cook who saved the life of Mahatma Gandhi from a murder attempt by food poisoning in 1917. He was an employee of an indigo plant at Motihari, Bihar. Afterwards, he was ousted from his job, tortured, and compelled to leave the village.

== Incident ==
Gandhi was invited to dinner by a British officer in Champaran during the Champaran Satyagraha. Asked by the officer to serve Gandhi a glass of poisoned milk, Mian ensured that Gandhi did not drink the milk by revealing the plot to Rajendra Prasad. As a consequence, Mian was tortured by the British officer, lost his house and property, and was driven out of his village.

== After Independence of India ==
Rajendra Prasad visited Motihari in 1950, as President of India. A crowd formed around him and he recognized Batak Mian from the crowd, and described the 1917 incident to the public. Prasad ordered a grant of 24 acres of land to Mian as an appreciation from the nation. Mian died in 1957.
