= Motihari =

Motihari Mōtīhārī
- City
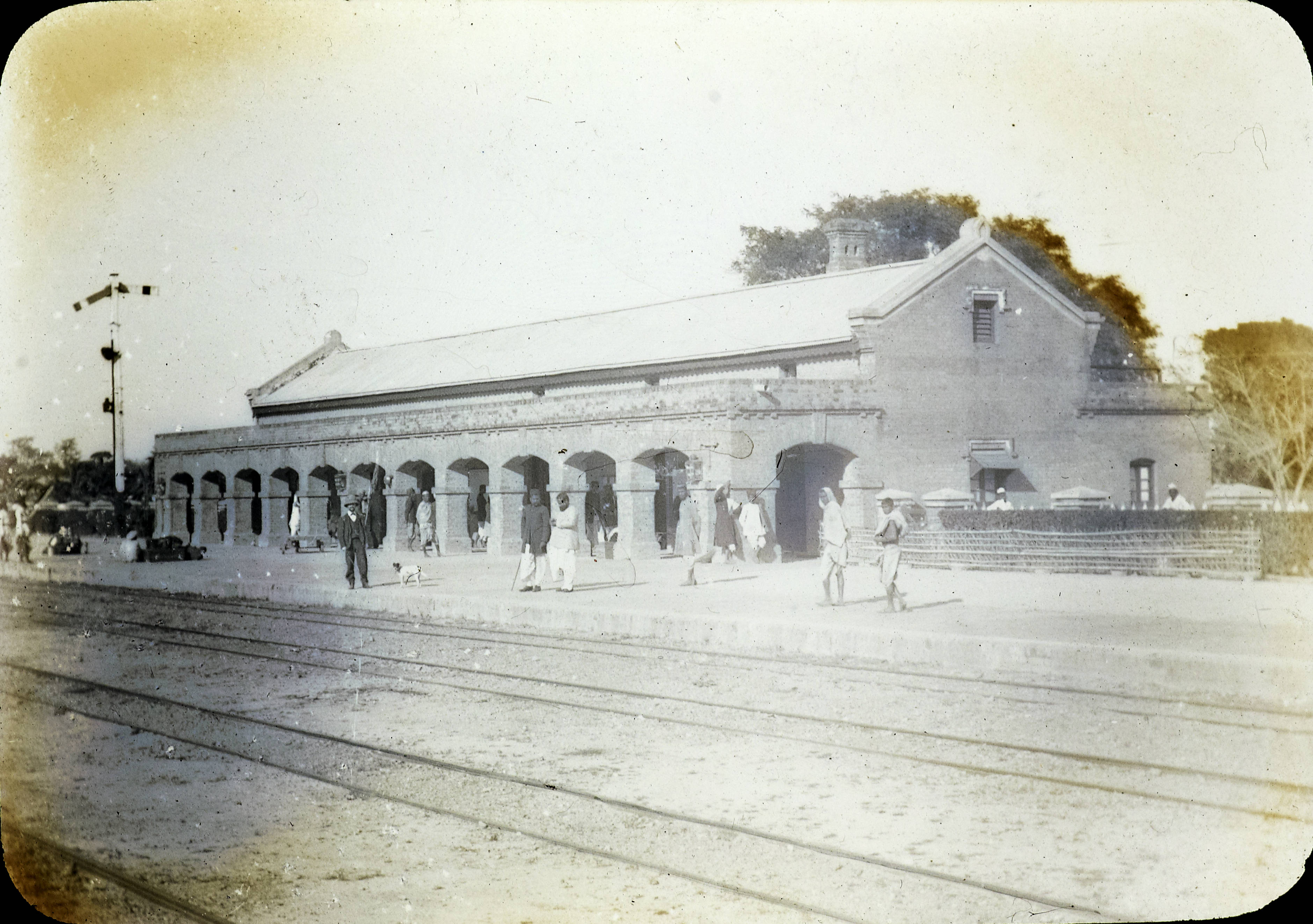
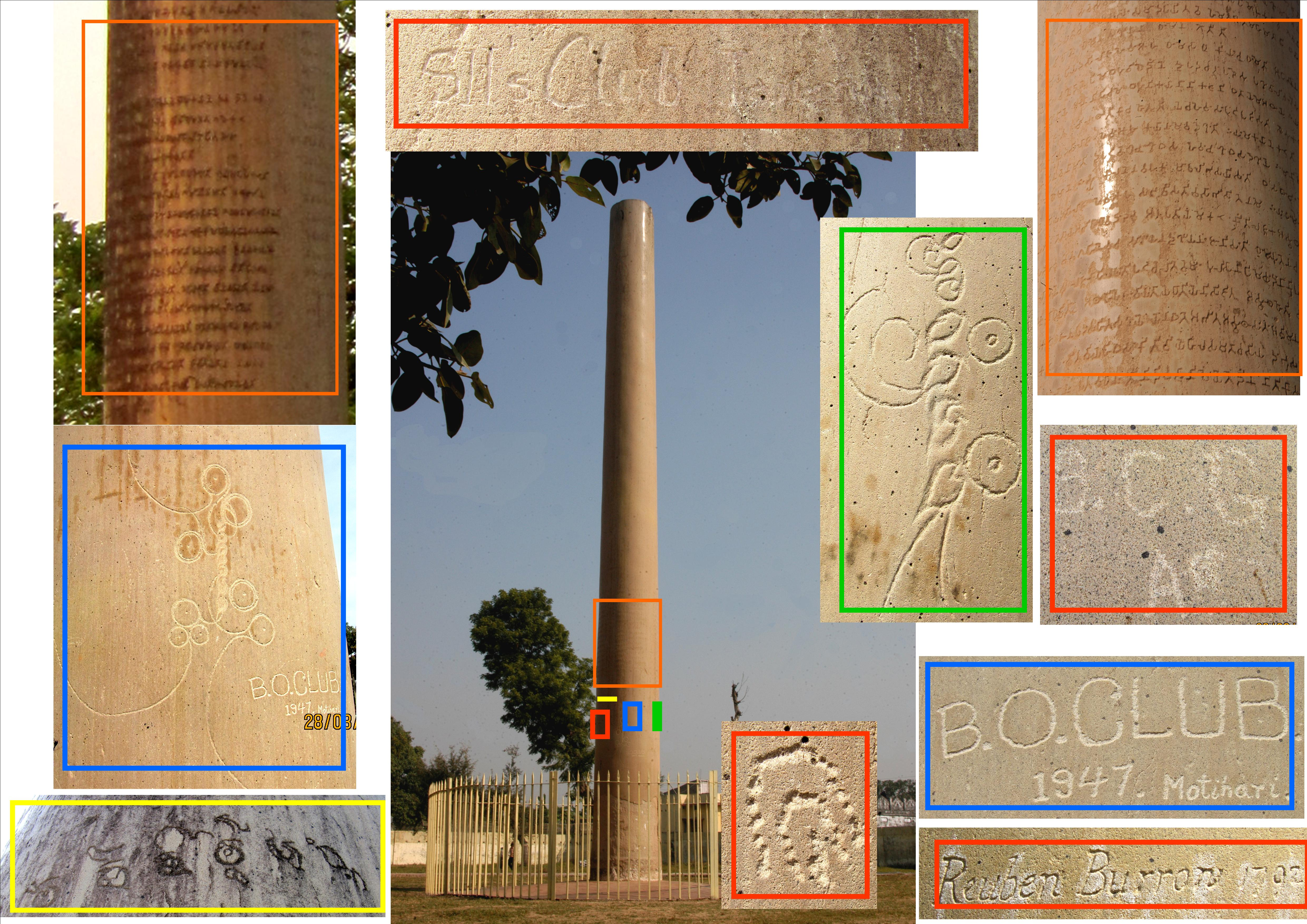
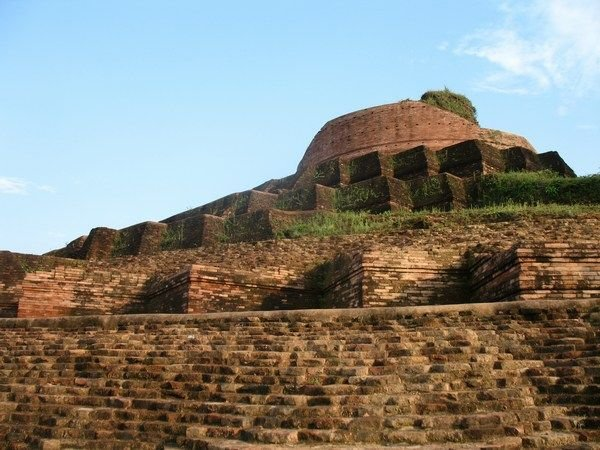
- Nickname: Lake city
- Location in Bihar, India Location in India
- Coordinates: 26°39′00″N 84°55′00″E
- Country: India
- State: Bihar
- District: East Champaran
- Ward(s): 46
- Established: 1866
- Named for: 'Champak’ and ‘Aranya’.

Government
  - Type: Municipal corporation
  - Body: Motihari Municipal Corporation
  - MLA: Pramod Kumar (BJP)
  - Mayor: Preeti Kumari

Area
  - Total: 236.97 km^{2} (91.49 sq mi)
  - Rank: 04
- Elevation: 62 m (203 ft)

Population (2011)
  - Total: 426,158
  - Density: 1,798.4/km^{2} (4,657.7/sq mi)
- Demonym(s): Motiharivashi, Champaran vashi

Language
  - Official: Hindi
  - Additional official: Urdu
  - Regional: Bhojpuri
- Time zone: UTC+5:30 (IST)
- PIN: 845401, 845435, 845437
- Telephone code: 06252
- ISO 3166 code: IN-BR
- Vehicle registration: BR-05
- Lok Sabha constituency: Purvi Champaran
- Vidhan Sabha constituency: Motihari
- Website: eastchamparan.bih.nic.in

Motihari (Note: ISO: Mōtīhārī) is a city and headquarters of East Champaran district in the Indian state of Bihar. It is located 80 kilometres west of Muzaffarpur and 152 kilometres northwest of the state capital Patna. Mahatma Gandhi started his famous Satyagraha movement from here.

== Geography ==
Motihari is located on 26°39' N and 84°55' E in northwestern Bihar. It is about 165 km (103 mi) northwest from the state capital Patna, 45 km (28 mi) from Bettiah, 72 km (45 mi) from Muzaffarpur, 32 km (20 mi) from Chakia, 40 km (25 mi) from Mehsi, and 75 km (47 mi) from Sitamarhi. It is on the east bank of a lake, about 40 km (25 mi) southeast of Bettiah.

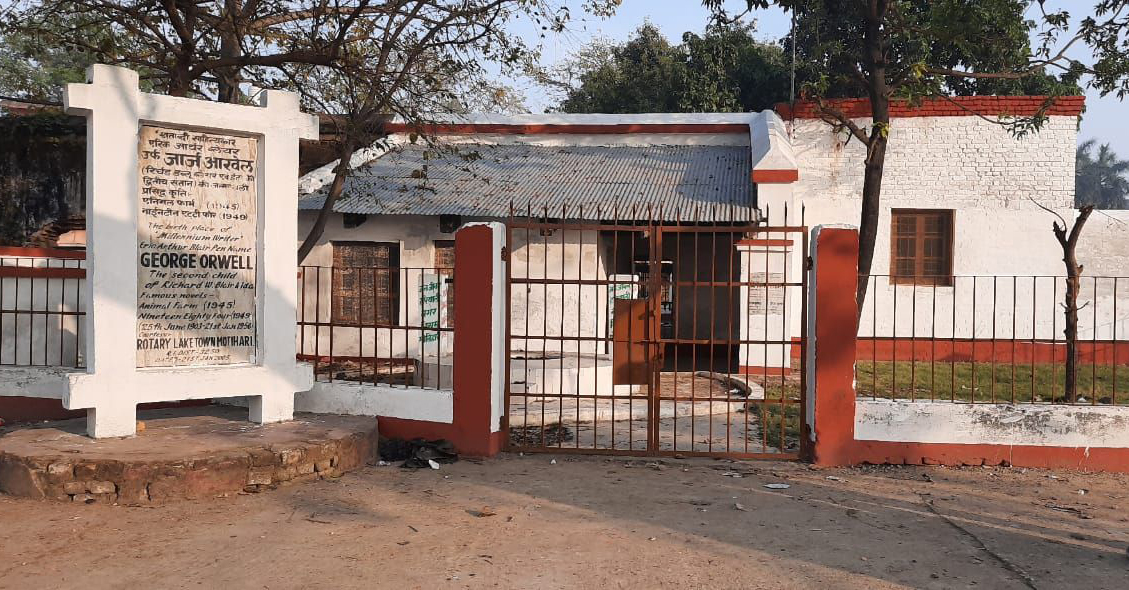
Birthplace of George Orwell, Motihari, District-East Champaran (Bihar)

=== Topography ===
The topography of Motihari has been described as scenic, with the "stunning beauty" (in classical terms) of Moti Jheel Lake dividing the town in two halves.

In Gangan Lit-Mag (Gangway Literary Magazine), Austria, wrote Anant Kumar: "The playgrounds of my childhood were the streets of Motihari. Back then that little East Indian town was not overpopulated, and the dry, clean streets of every part of town were ideal for our games: marbles, tops, badminton. And back then Motihari was a wide distance away from the big world. There were very many mango and lichee trees, fragrant lemon bushes, broad, large fields...and very few people. There were scattered decrepit hawelis and bungalows, in which frightening bhuts, geniis and juraels dwelled."

The Gandhi Sangrahalaya has a wide collection of relics and photographs of the Champaran Satyagraha. The Gandhian Memorial Pillar was designed by Nand Lal Bose, a famous artist of Shantiniketan. The foundation stone of the pillar was laid on 10 June 1972 by the then Governor, D. K. Barooch. It is a 48-foot-tall (15 m) stone pillar and is situated at the same site where Mahatma Gandhi was presented in court.

The world's largest Shivling, a 231-ton, 33-foot black granite monolith, was installed on 18 January 2026, at the Virat Ramayan Mandir in Motihari, Bihar. The monolith, carved from a single block in Tamil Nadu, features 1,008 smaller lingams on its surface. Weighing 231 tons, it was carefully placed on a pedestal by two 750-ton cranes, guided by engineers. The event coincided with the auspicious Magh Krishna Chaturdashi, and included Vedic chants, rituals by priests from various holy centers, and the use of sacred water from places like Gangotri and Prayagraj. The installation was followed by a flower petal shower from a helicopter and marked by chants of "Har Har Mahadev." The temple is still under construction, with the pran prathishta ceremony scheduled for a later date.

=== Climate ===
Climate is characterised by high temperatures and precipitation mainly occurring during the Monsoon Season [June to September]. The Köppen Climate Classification sub-type for this climate is "Cwa" (Humid Subtropical). The highest maximum temperature ever recorded in Motihari was 44.4 °C on 24 May 1903, while the lowest minimum temperature ever recorded in Motihari was 0.0 °C on 3 February 1905. The heaviest rainfall recorded in 24 hours in Motihari was 520 mm on 25 August 2005.

Climate data for Motihari
Month	Jan	Feb	Mar	Apr	May	Jun	Jul	Aug	Sep	Oct	Nov	Dec	Year
Record high °C (°F)	31.3 (88.3)	35.6 (96.1)	42.9 (109.2)	42.2 (108.0)	44.4 (111.9)	43.3 (109.9)	42.8 (109.0)	40.5 (104.9)	40.5 (104.9)	38.4 (101.1)	35.6 (96.1)	30.0 (86.0)	44.4 (111.9)
Mean daily maximum °C (°F)	22.4 (72.3)	25.2 (77.4)	31.0 (87.8)	35.3 (95.5)	35.7 (96.3)	34.8 (94.6)	32.4 (90.3)	32.4 (90.3)	32.2 (90.0)	31.5 (88.7)	28.7 (83.7)	24.4 (75.9)	30.5 (86.9)
Daily mean °C (°F)	15.4 (59.7)	17.8 (64.0)	22.9 (73.2)	27.4 (81.3)	29.3 (84.7)	29.9 (85.8)	28.9 (84.0)	28.9 (84.0)	28.3 (82.9)	26.1 (79.0)	21.5 (70.7)	17.1 (62.8)	24.4 (75.9)
Mean daily minimum °C (°F)	8.4 (47.1)	10.5 (50.9)	14.8 (58.6)	19.6 (67.3)	23.0 (73.4)	25.1 (77.2)	25.4 (77.7)	25.5 (77.9)	24.5 (76.1)	20.7 (69.3)	14.4 (57.9)	9.8 (49.6)	18.5 (65.3)
Record low °C (°F)	2.2 (36.0)	0.0 (32.0)	5.6 (42.1)	8.3 (46.9)	13.7 (56.7)	15.4 (59.7)	18.9 (66.0)	19.9 (67.8)	18.4 (65.1)	11.4 (52.5)	6.4 (43.5)	1.7 (35.1)	0.0 (32.0)
Average rainfall mm (inches)	12.2 (0.48)	14.3 (0.56)	9.1 (0.36)	24.6 (0.97)	51.9 (2.04)	215.0 (8.46)	366.4 (14.43)	289.6 (11.40)	247.6 (9.75)	50.8 (2.00)	4.2 (0.17)	4.7 (0.19)	1,290.4 (50.80)
Average rainy days	1.1	1.3	0.7	1.6	3.0	8.5	13.8	11.6	8.8	2.2	0.2	0.5	53.3
Average relative humidity (%) (at 17:30 IST)	69.0	58.0	49.0	46.0	52.0	68.0	80.0	80.0	79.0	73.0	71.0	70.0	66.0
Source: Indian Meteorological Department

== Demographics ==
Religions in Motihari (2011)
Religion	Percent
Hindus	77.45%
Muslims	21.90%
Others	0.65%

As of 2011 Indian Census, Motihari had a total population of 126,158, of which 67,861 were males and 58,297 were females, with a sex ratio of 859. Population within the age group of 0 to 6 years was 16,870. The total number of literates in Motihari was 92,798, which constituted 73.6% of the population with male literacy of 76.2% and female literacy of 70.5%. The effective literacy rate of 7+ population of Motihari was 84.9%, of which male literacy rate was 88.1% and female literacy rate was 81.2%. The Scheduled Castes and Scheduled Tribes population was 7,373 and 333 respectively. Motihari had 22,224 households in 2011.

As of 2001 India census, the population of Motihari in 2011 was 101,506, of which male and female were 54,629 and 46,877, respectively. The sex ratio of Motihari city is 858 per 1,000 males. Total literates in Motihari city are 69,576 of which 40,265 were males while 29,311 were females. The crude literacy rate of 68.5% and effective literacy (7+ population) per cent of 80.3%. The children aged 0–6 in Motihari city are 14,910, as per the Census India report, in 2001, with 7,811 males and 7,099 females. The child sex ratio of girls is 909 per 1,000 boys.

== Education ==
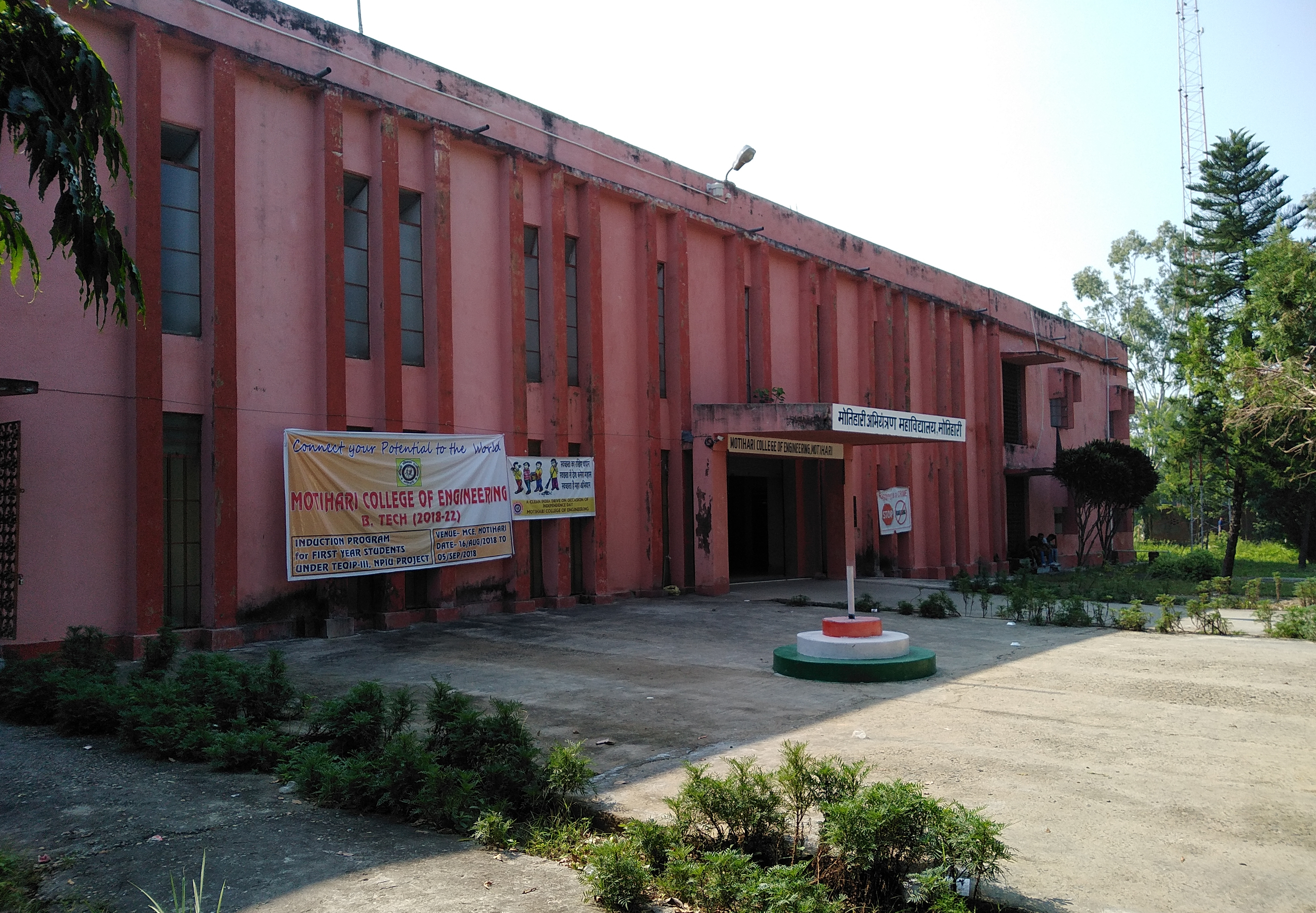
Motihari College of Engineering

The city hosts a number of institutes and universities for higher education supported by both state and central governments.

- Motihari College of Engineering.
- Mahatma Gandhi Central University
- MS College (Munshi Singh College)

== Notable people ==
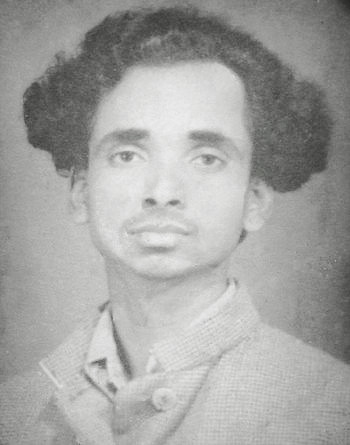
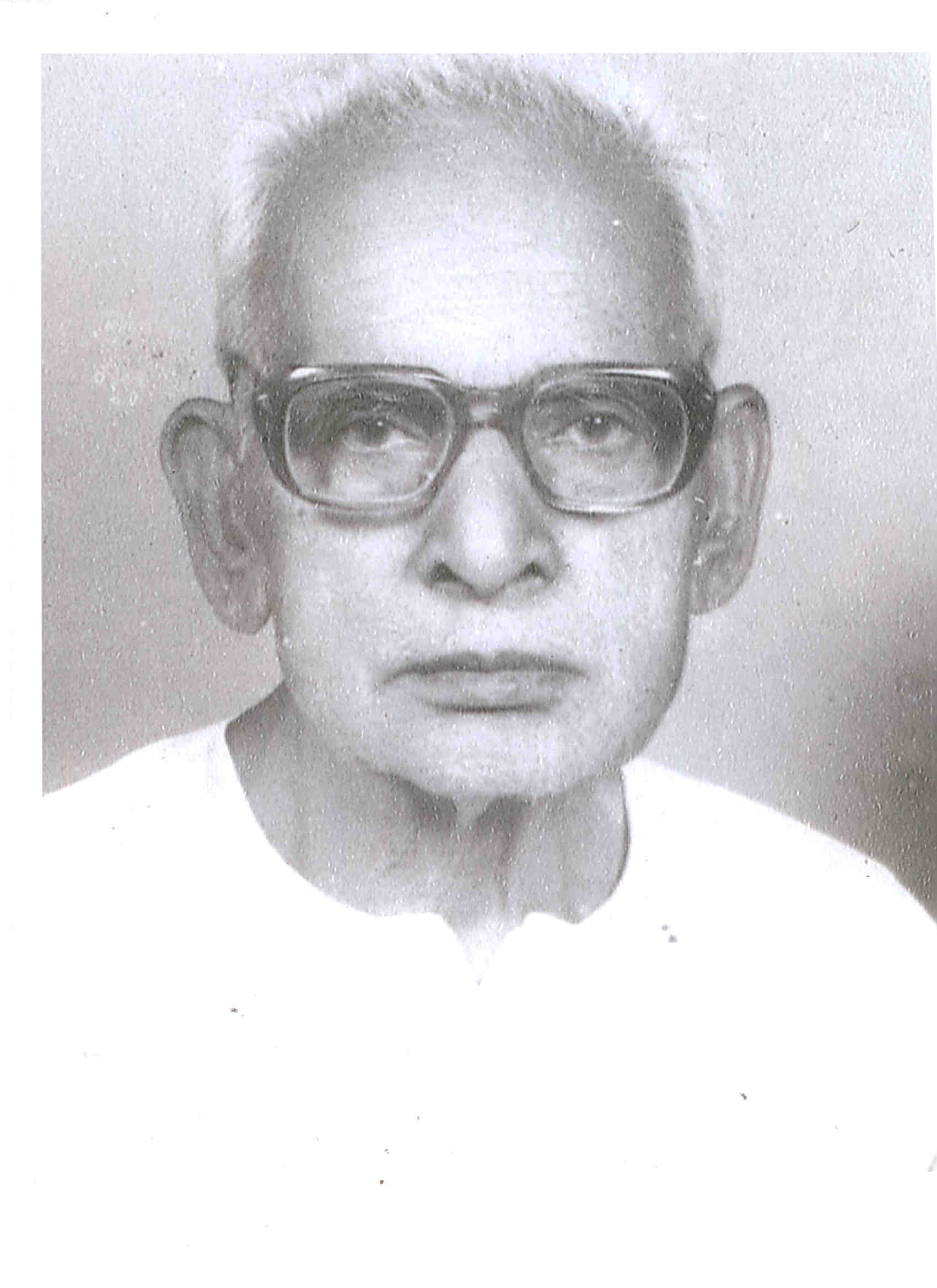
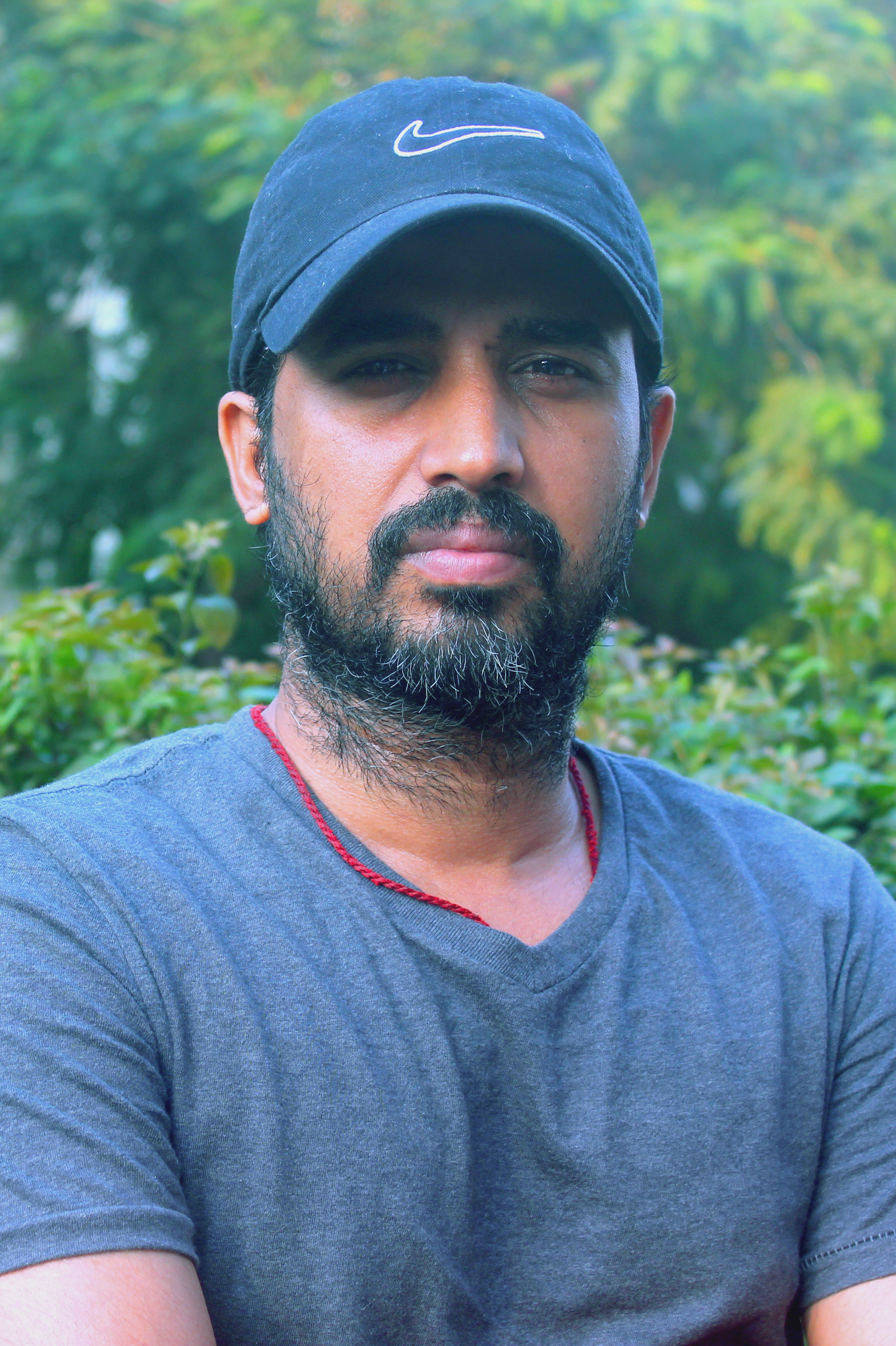
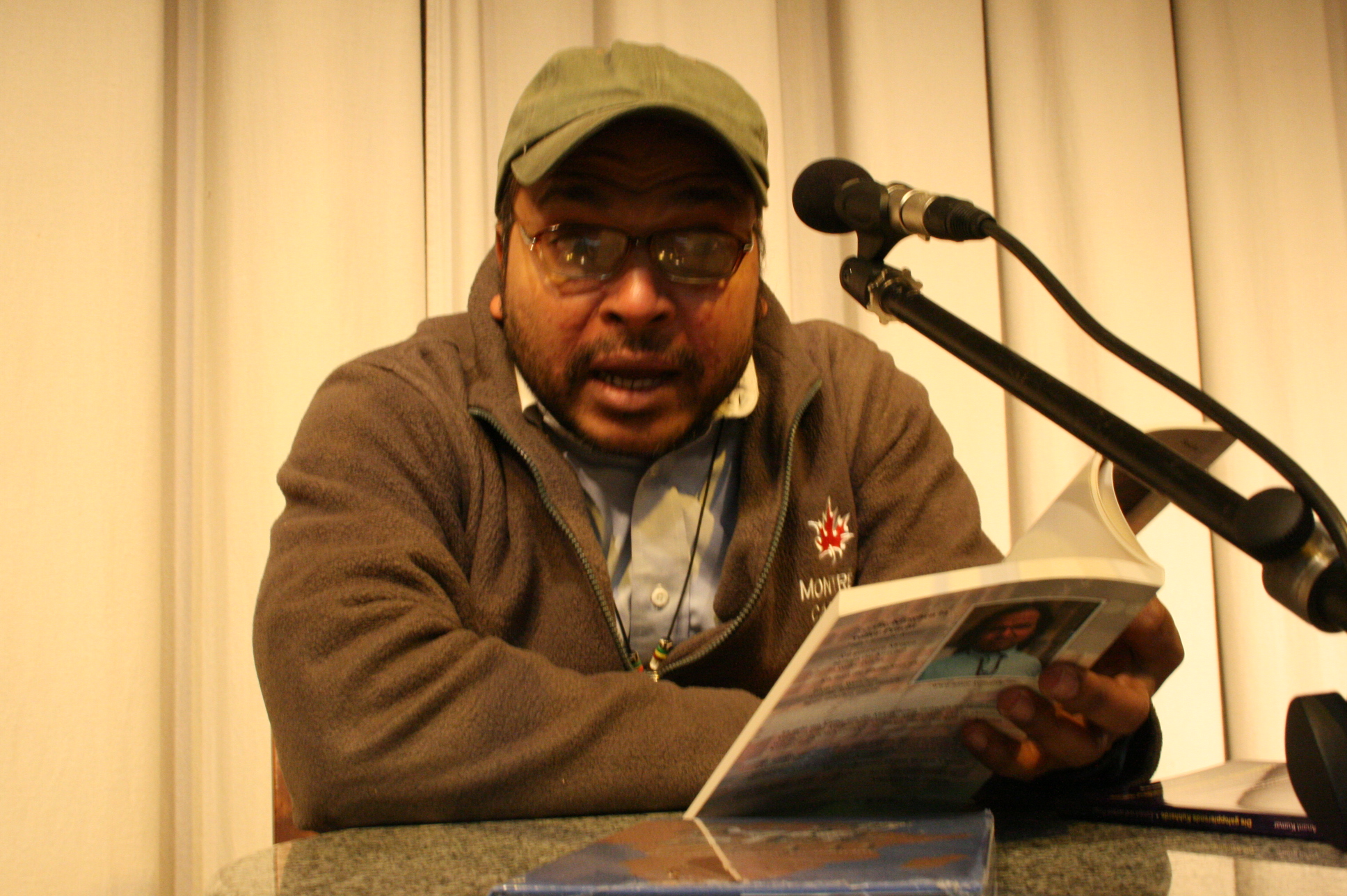
Clockwise from upper left: Ramesh Chandra Jha, Thakur Ramapati Singh, Sanjeev K Jha, Anant Kumar.
- George Orwell, author. Orwell's home and the 2.48 acre property was inaugurated as a museum in May 2015.
- Ramesh Chandra Jha,(8 May 1928 – 7 April 1994) poet
- Khan Bahadur Azizul Huq, one of the two Indian police officers who worked with Edward Henry in the development of fingerprint classification
- A.F. Salahuddin Ahmed, National Professor of Bangladesh, a grandson of Khan Bahadur Azizul Huq
- Thakur Ramapati Singh, a freedom fighter, MLA, Minister, and MP from Motihari.
- Anant Kumar, (born 1969 in Katihar/Bihar), author, translator and literary critic Kumar worked 2016 as a fellow in the symposium for dramatic writing at Volturno, Italy. University of Kassel has picked Kumar among prominent alumni on its diamond jubilee celebration 2021. In 2024 he was counted among the representative citizens in the city of Kassel, North Hess, Germany.
- Vallabha, saint and philosopher, founded the Krishna-centered Pushtimarg sect of Vaishnavism in the Braj (Vraja) region of India, and propounded the philosophy of Śuddhādvaita.
- Anuranjan Jha, journalist, TV anchor and social worker.
- Ravish Kumar, TV anchor and journalist, NDTV Delhi.
- Abdullah Khan (author) is a novelist, screenwriter and banker.
- Radha Mohan Singh, Union Minister of Agriculture & Farmers Welfare.
- Sakibul Gani, first cricketer in the world to score a Triple century on his First class debut.
- Avinash Tiwary,is an Indian actor known for his work in Hindi films and web series.
- Sanjeev K Jha, is a film maker and screenwriter, currently based on Mumbai who wrote several popular TV shows and films. Jabariya Jodi, Barot House and Sumi (film) are his notable works. Also, the first writer from Motihari whose written film Sumi (film) received three National Film Awards.
- Raksha Gupta, actress in many notable Bhojpuri films Thik Hai, Commando Arjun, Rowdy Inspector (2022 film), Doli Saja Ke Rakhna (2022 film), Shankhnaad.
- Abhay Pandey, General Partner at A91 Partners, Distinguished Alumni from IIT Bombay.

== Connection with Gandhi ==
Motihari, at that time called Champaran, was close to Mahatma Gandhi. He came to Motihari on 15 April, 1917 with Raj Kumar Shukla to start the Satyagraha movement in Champaran, known as Champaran Satyagraha, which concerned the exploitations of farmers. Gandhi with his supporters held a big campaign in Champaran. His frequent visits to Champaran and its local areas showed the Gandhi's connection with land. He also understood the cultural and social backwardness of the area, he acted immediately by creating schools and ashrams.

== See also ==
- Mehsi
- Raxaul
