= Anuranjan Jha =

Indian journalist

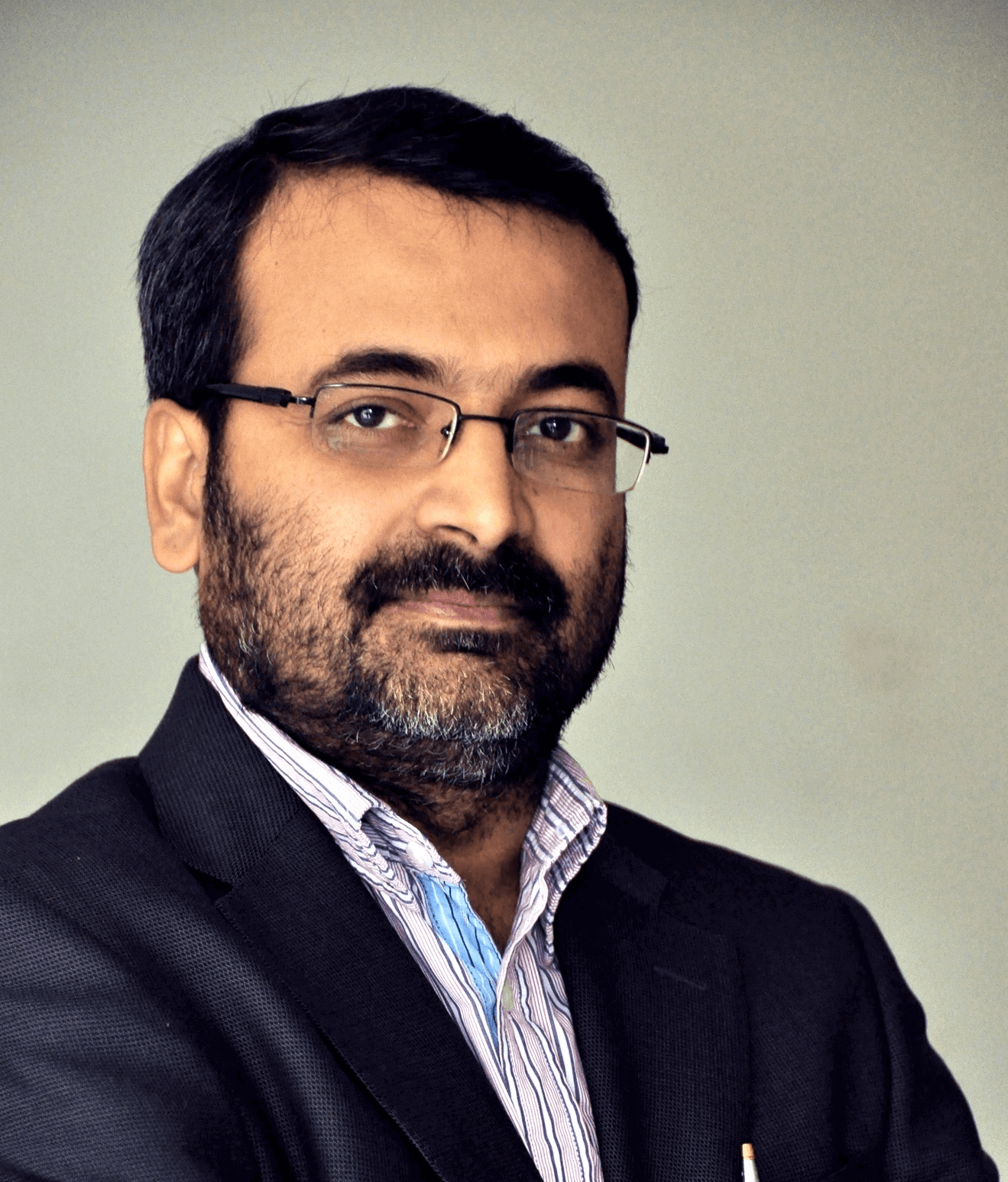
- Anuranjan Jha
- Born: 1 March 1977; Motihari, Bihar
- Education: Delhi University and Indian Institute of Mass Communication (IIMC)
- Occupations: Journalist; author; activist
- Relatives: Ramesh Chandra Jha (Grandfather) Sanjeev K Jha (Cousin)
- Website: www.anuranjanjha.com

Anuranjan Jha is an Indian journalist and author. For the past 28 years. He was the founder and CEO of "Media Sarkar", an online current affairs website that conducted controversial sting operation on Aam Aadmi Party in 2013. Prior to that, Jha had launched India's first matrimonial television channel, Shagun TV. His career in journalism spans 25 years. Before launching Shagun TV, Jha has worked with India TV, Cobrapost, Zee News, Aaj Tak, BAG Films, India News and Jansatta, and was chief operating officer (COO) of CNEB, a news channel. He has published four books as an author- Ramlila Maidan, Gandhi Maidan, Jhoom and a fiction Haqeekat Nagar .

Currently living in Shrewsbury, England and contributing as columnist in various national and international media houses including Outlook He is associated as a President of the British organisation Gandhian Peace Society

== Early life and education ==
Jha hails from a small village called Phulwaria in East Champaran district of Bihar. His grandfather's elder brother Ramesh Chandra Jha was a freedom fighter and noted author. Jha graduated in history from University of Delhi and received a post-graduate diploma in Journalism from the Indian Institute of Mass Communication. Later, he also took a post-graduate degree in history from Sabarmati University and Masters in Journalism from GJU.

== Career ==
Jha started his Journalism career with Print Media and worked with Indian Express and Jansatta as a correspondent. At the age of 30, Anuranjan Jha became an Editor and News Director of the Hindi news channel India News. He thereafter worked with companies like Zee news, Aaj Tak, BAG Films, India TV, India News, Cobrapost, Jansatta. He subsequently became managing director of Vertent Media Soft Pvt. Ltd., a media company, where he helped launch a full-fledged 24-hour lifestyle/entertainment TV channel called Shagun TV, India's first matrimonial channel.

Anuranjan Jha founded Park Media Pvt Ltd. in 2009 and started a News and Investigative Web Portal mediasarkar.com in 2010. He is currently founder and CEO of Media Sarkar. He has been writing features, articles, columns on different social and political issues in many national newspapers, magazines and journals. In May 2013 International Magazine Arcade published him on the cover page.

Currently, Jha is writing for Outlook (Indian magazine) on International relations and politics from Shrewsbury, England.

== Controversy ==
Jha came into prominence when Media Sarkar, of which he was the founder and CEO, came out with video tapes to suggest that Aam Aadmi Party(AAP) party members are corrupt. On 21 November 2013, Jha revealed a footage from a sting operation in which he claimed that several AAP leaders were caught accepting money from individuals illegally.

The AAP demanded the raw footage, which Jha refused to provide and invited several agencies and election commission of India to investigate the sting.

== Literary works ==
Anuranjan Jha's first book "Ramleela-Maidan" was published by Antika Prakashan in 2017. The book covers the Anna Hazare movement and discusses the rise and decline of the Aam Aadmi Party and its leader Arvind Kejriwal. His second book, 'Gandhi-Maidan. Bluff of Social Justice' focuses on Bihar’s political landscape and critically examines the narrative of social justice in the state’s power politics.

He later authored "Jhoom", in which he accounted harsh reality of liquor prohibition in Bihar."Jhoom". In 2022, the English edition of his first book, "Ramleela-Maidan" got published. In 2024, he published his first fiction work, Haqeeqat Nagar, which was formally launched by senior journalist Rajat Sharma

== Undercover investigative journalism ==
Anuranjan Jha is also known for conducting and executing many secret sting operations in India that have been carried out by different agencies, media houses and organisations over the years that created sensation in the nation and put his life in dangerous situations many times. Jha has allegedly exposed many faces, right from cricketers to politicians and even the Aam Aadmi Party and their politicians and rocked the entire country with the help of a few trusty colleagues and a couple of spy cams.

== Bhor Trust ==
In 2016, Jha established a charitable trust called Bhor trust, to carry out work in the fields of Health and Education in rural Bihar. The trust also gives achiever awards and conducts literary festivals.

== Achievements ==
- मेरी दिल्ली अवार्ड (Meri Dilli Award) 2011
