= Tikuliya =

Tikuliya may refer to:

- Tikuliya, Narayani, Nepal
- Tikuliya, Sagarmatha, Nepal
- Tikuliya, Bihar, India
