= Baa Baaa Black Sheep (film) =

2018 film directed by Vishal Pandya

- Official Poster
- Directed by: Vishwas Paandya
- Written by: Sunjiv Puri; Vishwas Paandya
- Produced by: Anand Swarup Agarwal; Krishna Datla
- Starring: Manish Paul; Anupam Kher; Manjari Phadnis; Annu Kapoor; Kay Kay Menon
- Cinematography: Amalendu Chaudhary; Manoj Soni
- Edited by: Bakul Matiyani
- Music by: Shaan; Roshan Balu; Gourov DasGupta
- Production companies: Super cassets industries ltd. Agastya Films
- Distributed by: T-Series
- Release date: 23 March 2018
- Running time: 103 minutes
- Country: India
- Language: Hindi

Baa Baaa Black Sheep is a 2018 Indian action comedy film starring Anupam Kher, Manish Paul, Annu Kapoor, Manjari Phadnis and Kay Kay Menon in lead roles. The film is directed by Vishwas Paandya and produced by Anand Swarup Agarwal and Krishna Datla. The film was released on 23 March 2018. It is a standalone sequel to Mickey Virus.

== Plot ==
Baa Baa Black Sheep is the story of Baba, who is still trying to find his bearings. Baba's father, Charudutt Sharma who is a boring Cashew nut dealer for everyone, reveals to a shocked Baba on his 25th birthday that actually they are a family of hit men since the past 12 generations, and now Baba has to take over as the 13th. On the other hand, Baba's love interest Angelina runs a Beach Cafe. Her father Brian Morris is a retired art teacher, but fuels his greed for money and excitement, by selling fakes of an old Renoir painting that his family has inherited. With Baba and Angelina, both keeping their respective secrets, problems start when Kamya, an art gallery owner, wants the original Renoir and blackmails the Home Minister, Utpal Shivalkar for it. Drugs, Contract killings and blackmail account for ACP Shivraj entering the scene trying to find out the connection between all the chaos.

== Cast ==
- Manish Paul as Baba
- Anupam Kher as Charudutt Sharma/Charlie
- Manjari Phadnis as Angelina Morris
- Annu Kapoor as Brian Morris/Santa Claus
- Kay Kay Menon as A.C.P Shivraj Naik
- Natasha Suri as Kamya
- Manish Wadhwa as Utpal Shivalkar/Home Minister
- Mamta Verma as Manju Sharma
- B. Shantanu as Kamaal
- Vineet Sharma as Daniel D'Costa
- Aakash Dabhade as Johny Fixer
- Kirthi Shetty as Jamaal
- Scarlett Mellish Wilson as item number "Galla Goriyan"

== Soundtrack ==
Galla Goriyan / Aaja Soniye – The first song of the film is recreated by Gourav-Roshin which is based on Abhijit Vaghani's Mashup from The T-Series Mixtape Punjabi.

Track listing
No.	Title	Lyrics	Music	Singer(s)	Length
1.	"Galla Goriyan / Aaja Soniye"	Jalees Sherwani, Babbu Maan	Superbia (Gourov-Roshin & Shaan), Jaidev Kumar, Sajid–Wajid	Mika Singh, Kanika Kapoor	3:53
2.	"Heer"	Rajesh Manthan	Superbia (Gourov-Roshin & Shaan)	Mika Singh, Mahalakshmi Iyer	3:40
3.	"Baa Baaa Black Sheep"	Sunil Sirvaiya	Superbia (Gourov-Roshin & Shaan)	Shaan, Manisha Chakravaty	3:16
4.	"Angelina"	Sunil Sirvaiya	Superbia (Gourov-Roshin & Shaan)	Sonu Nigam	4:19
5.	"Ram Leela"	Rajesh Manthan	Superbia (Gourov-Roshin & Shaan)	Kumar Sapan	3:21
Total length:					18:29
