= Sanjeev K Jha =

Indian screenwriter (born 1988)

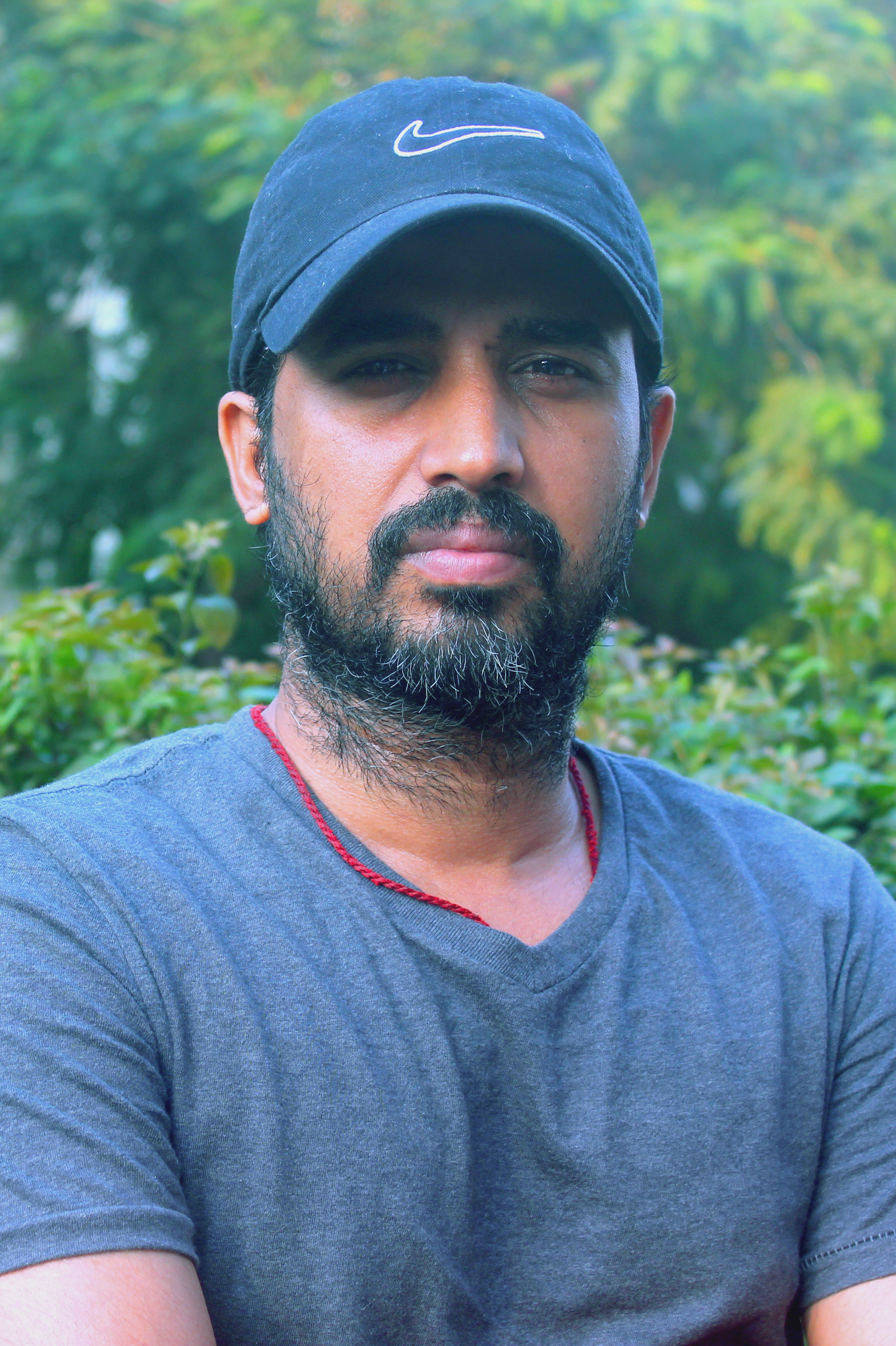
- Jha in 2019
- Born: 1988 (age 37–38); Motihari, Bihar, India
- Education: Jamia Millia Islamia; Langat Singh College
- Occupation: Screenwriter
- Relatives: Ramesh Chandra Jha (maternal grandfather)
- Writing career
- Years active: 2014 to present
- Notable works: Sumi; Barot House

Sanjeev K Jha (born 1988) is an Indian screenwriter based in Mumbai. In the 68th National Film Awards Sanjeev's feature film Sumi bag national awards in three categories, National Film Award for Best Children's Film and National Film Award for Best Child Artist.

== Early life and background ==
Sanjeev K Jha is the grandson of Ramesh Chandra Jha, an Indian independence activist, poet and novelist. A native of a small village in Champaran, Bihar, Jha is a gold medalist from Jamia Millia Islamia in Hindi literature.

== Career ==
Jha started his career as a freelance journalist and worked with The Indian Express, Jansatta, Hindustan HT Media, Dainik Jagran and Outlook.

His first Hindi feature as story and screenplay writer Jabariya Jodi was produced by Ekta Kapoor, Shobha Kapoor and Shailesh R Singh starring Sidharth Malhotra and Parineeti Chopra.

In June 2019, Jha signed a digital film Barot House with ZEE5 starring Amit Sadh and Manjari Fadnis. Barot House is a dark, gripping story inspired by true events, released worldwide by ZEE5 on 7 August 2019 and also got nominated in 2020 Filmfare OTT Awards.

In 2022 his Marathi feature film Sumi won National Award in two categories, 68th National Film Awards for National Film Award for Best Children's Film and National Film Award for Best Child Artist.

Jha's forthcoming film Tirichh: Portrait of a Dying Man adapts a renowned story by Uday Prakash. The film explores themes of human relationships and societal disparities through the lens of an evocative narrative. Featuring Panchayat actor Chandan Roy, the project is an ambitious effort to bring Indian literary treasures to cinematic life. With a focus on capturing the essence of rural India, Tirichh is poised to be a thought-provoking addition to Jha's filmography. Jha's dedication to storytelling reflects his intent to blend cinematic art with meaningful narratives. By choosing works like Tirichh, he continues to spotlight the richness of Indian literature and its relevance in contemporary times.

== Filmography ==
Year	Film	Story	Screenplay	Dialogue	Notes
2014	Pyaar Tune Kya Kiya		Yes	Yes	Television series
2015	Code Red	Yes	Yes	Yes	Television series
2019	Barot House	Yes	Yes	Yes	Hindi Feature Film
2019	Jabariya Jodi	Yes	Yes		Hindi Feature Film
2020	Sumi	Yes	Yes		Marathi Feature Film

== Awards and nominations ==
Award	Category	Result	Official name
68th National Film Awards	Best Children's Film : Sumi	Won	Golden Lotus Award (Swarna Kamal)
68th National Film Awards	Best Child Artist : Sumi	Won	Silver Lotus Award (Rajat Kamal)
ET Brand Equity's SPOTT Awards 2020	Best OTT Long Format Film : Barot House	Won	Bronze Award
2020 Filmfare OTT Awards	Web Originals Best Film : Barot House / Best Actor Male : Amit Sadh	Nominated	Filmfare OTT Awards
