= Raj Kumar Shukla =

Indian independence activist (1875–1929)

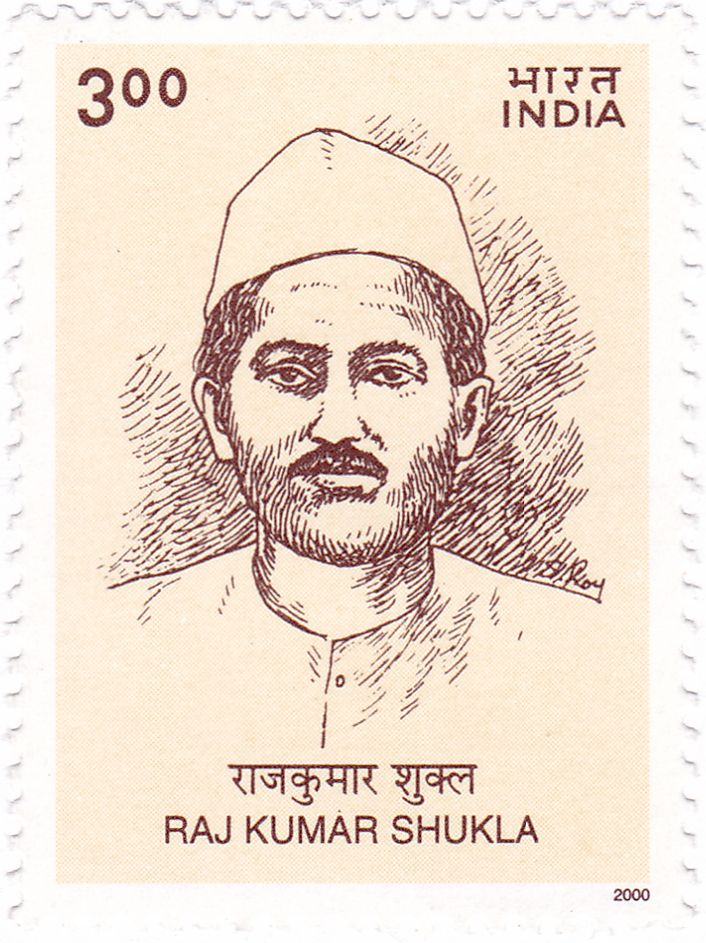
- Raj kumar Shukla on a 2000 stamp of India
- Born: 23 August 1875; Murli Bharahwa, Champaran, Bihar
- Died: 20 May 1929 (aged 53); Motihari, Bihar
- Occupations: Freedom fighter, Farmer
- Children: 2 daughters
- Writing career
- Language: Bhojpuri, Maithili, Hindi
- Period: 1890s – 1920s

Raj Kumar Shukla (23 August 1875 – 20 May 1929) was the person who convinced Mahatma Gandhi to visit Champaran which later led to the Champaran Satyagraha. Shukla, at the time, was paid well to work under Hafiz Din Mohammad and was sent to meet Gandhi.

== Biography ==
During the 31st session of the Congress in Lucknow in 1916, Gandhiji met Raj Kumar Shukla, a representative of farmers from Champaran, who requested him to come and see for himself the miseries of the indigo ryots (tenant farmers) there. Gandhi later wrote in his autobiography “I must confess that I did not then know even the name, much less the geographical position, of Champaran, and I had hardly any notion of indigo plantations.” Shukla thus met Gandhi to make him aware of the plight of the cultivators in Champaran and persuaded him to go there. He was a known Indigo cultivator of the area as he was a money lender from village Murli Bharahwa near Narkatiyaganj in West Champaran, earning, according to his own statement before the enquiry committee set up by the provincial government, a sum of two thousand rupees a month from interest.

== Honour ==
To commemorate his 125th birth anniversary, the Department of Posts released a stamp in his honour in 2000. On the occasion of 100 years of Champaran Satyagrah Govt. of Bihar established a Statue of Pt. Rajkumar Shukla at Gandhi Sangrhalay (गांधी संग्रहालय) Patna. The Gandhi Peace Foundation in Delhi has showcased a photograph of Raj Kumar Shukla.

== Books on Raj Kumar Shukla ==
On the occasion of 100 years of Champaran Satyagraha, Arvind Mohan wrote a book on him and his other supporters titles Champaran : Satyagrah Ke Sahyogi. The book was released by Chief Minister of Bihar Nitish Kumar on 10 April 2017. In September 2017 Mohan wrote another book, Mr. M.K. Gandhi ki Champaran Diary, where Raj Kumar Shukla emerged as main contributor of Mahatma Gandhi's satyagraha.

== Gandhi in Champaran ==
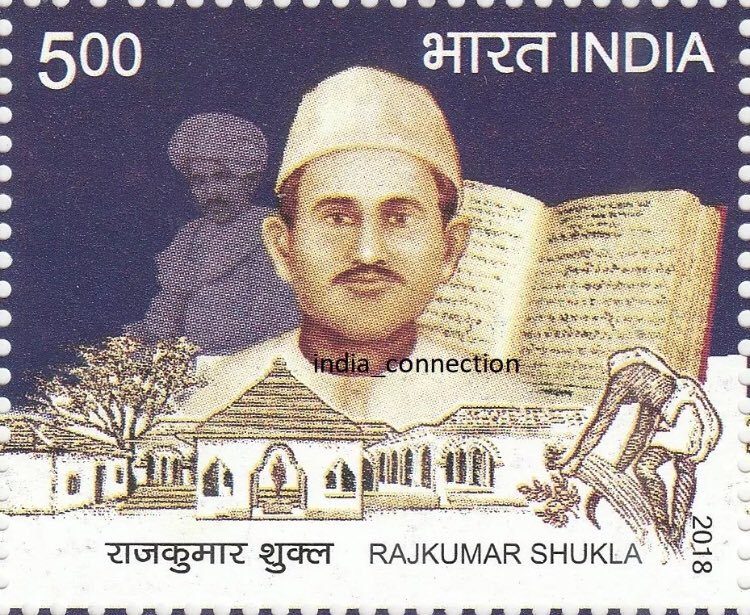
Shukla on a 2018 stamp of India

Mahatama Gandhi arrived in Champaran with his team of eminent nationalists, Rajendra Prasad, Anugrah Narayan Sinha, Brajkishore Prasad, after which the Champaran Satyagraha began.
