= Tikuliya, Bihar =

Village in India

Tikuliya is a village in the East Champaran district of Bihar, India. It is located in the Paharpur Block, and comes under Mankariya panchayat. It is situated 34 km west of the district headquarters Motihari, and 143 km from the state capital Patna. .

Tikuliya is surrounded by Areraj Block towards South, Harsidhi Block towards East, Dudhahi Block towards East, Nautan Block towards west . Areraj, Gopalganj, Sugauli, Bettiah are the nearby Cities to Tikuliya.

The village covers an area of 736.1 hectares, and has 5,011 residents in about 1,002 households. The nearest post office is Harsiddhi (PIN code: 845422).
