= Subhapradam =

- Directed by: K. Viswanath
- Screenplay by: K. Viswanath
- Story by: K. Viswanath
- Produced by: Hari Gopalakrishna; Pheela Neela Thilak
- Starring: Allari Naresh; Manjari Phadnis; Ananth
- Cinematography: Venugopal Madathil
- Music by: Mani Sharma
- Production company: Sri Rajeswari Combines
- Release date: 16 July 2010
- Country: India
- Language: Telugu

Subhapradam (transl. Auspicious) is a 2010 Indian Telugu-language drama film directed by K. Viswanath. It is his last directorial project and stars Allari Naresh and Manjari Phadnis.

== Plot ==
Indu (Manjari Phadnis) is a music loving girl. Her mother is a Malayali, and her father (Vizag Prasad) is Telugu. She has two paternal uncles (Ashok Kumar and Gundu Sudharshan), whose wives are from Chennai and Kolkata, respectively. Thus entire India lives in her family. She is good at speaking Telugu, Malayalam, Bengali and Tamil. She happens to see Chakri (Allari Naresh), who is a good singer but not a professional one. Chakri and Indu fall in love with each other. However, Chakri has a peculiar profession that gets revealed in the middle of the movie. It is to carry the old and disabled on his back for climbing the hill, the abode of a goddess.

Eventually, Indu happens to encounter a rich man, Sathyanarayana Reddy (Sarath Babu), who turns her life around. He had a granddaughter by name Sindhu who looks exactly like Indu. Sindhu dies in an acid attack, followed by ragging and hence when he sees the look-alike of his granddaughter in Indu, he follows her. What happens later becomes the rest of the movie.

== Cast ==
- Allari Naresh as Chakri
- Manjari Phadnis as Indu / Sindhu
- Sarath Babu as Sathyanarayana Reddy garu, Sindhu's grandfather
- Pavala Syamala as Mutyalu, Sindhu's grandmother
- Vizag Prasad as Chandra Shekhar, Indu's father
- Ramya Krishna as Priyamvada, Indu's mother
- Suhasini as Parvathi, Chakri's mother
- Sudha as Rajyalakshmi, Sindhu's mother
- Kota Srinivasa Rao as Lakshmi Narayana, Sindhu's father
- Giri Babu as Rama Chandra Murthy, Chakri's friend
- Chandra Mohan as Ram Babu, Chakri's father
- Raghu Babu as Raghu, Chakri's friend
- Rallapalli
- Jenny
- Ashok Kumar
- Gundu Sudharshan
- Vamsee Chaganti
- Devadas Kanakala

== Soundtrack ==
Subhapradam

Soundtrack album by Mani Sharma
- Released: 20 June 2010
- Recorded: 2010
- Genre: Feature film soundtrack
- Length: 32:02
- Language: Telugu
- Label: Saregama
- Producer: Mani Sharma

Mani Sharma chronology
Maanja Velu (2010)	Subhapradam (2010)	Don Seenu (2010)

The film has music scored by Mani Sharma. Karthik of Milliblog! wrote, "Barely functional soundtrack that begs the question, 'Vishwanath gaaru, why not Ilayaraja? Or even Keeravani?'"

Track-List
No.	Title	Lyrics	Singer(s)	Length
1.	"Tappatloi Taalaloi"	Ramajogayya Sastry	Chitra	4:14
2.	"Mouname Chebutondi"	Ananta Sriram	S. P. Balasubrahmanyam, Pranavi	5:00
3.	"Yelelo Yelelo"	Ananta Sriram	S. P. Balasubrahmanyam, Shankar Mahadevan	5:57
4.	"Nee Chupe Kadadaka"	Sirivennela Sitaramasastri	Karthik, Sunitha	4:58
5.	"Bailele Bailele Pallaki"	Ram Batla	Mallikarjun, Vijaya Lakshmi, Malavika	4:14
6.	"Orimi Chalamma O Bhumatoi"	Sirivennela Sitaramasastri	Rita Thyagarajan	5:16
7.	"Ambaparaku Deviparaku"	Kuchipudi traditional invocatory	D.S.V. Sastry	2:23
Total length:				32:02

== Reception ==
Radhika Rajamani of Rediff.com rated the film 2/5 stars and wrote, "Vishwanath sticks to his usual style of filmmaking. Fans will perhaps relate to Subhapradam, but others, particularly the younger generation, will find the film outdated". Raghu Chaitanya of IBN Live wrote, "Subhapradam is clearly a misfit. It is a dream that not only fails to draw the audience to the cinema hall but also manages to put the audience watching it to sleep".
