= Sumi (film) =

2022 Indian film by Amol Vasant Gole

- Official Movie Poster
- Directed by: Amol Gole
- Written by: Sanjeev K Jha
- Produced by: Harshall Kamat; Swati S Sharma; Mihir Kumar Sharma
- Starring: Akanksha Pingle; Divyesh Indulkar; Nitin Bhajan; Smita Tambe
- Cinematography: Amol Vasant Gole
- Edited by: Gandhali Kulkarni
- Music by: Rohan-Rohan
- Production companies: Harshall Kamat Entertainment; Golden Mouse Productions; A4 Creations
- Distributed by: Planet Marathi
- Release dates: 14 November 2022 (Planet Marathi OTT); 26 November 2022 (International Film Festival of India)
- Running time: 90 minutes
- Country: India
- Language: Marathi

Sumi is a 2022 Indian Marathi language feature film directed by Amol Gole and written by Sanjeev K Jha produced under Harshal Kamat Entertainment in association with Golden Mouse Productions. In 2022, The film won National Award in two prestigious category, National Film Award for Best Children's Film and National Film Award for Best Child Artist.

== Plot ==
Set in rural India, Sumi is an tale of a 12-year-old underprivileged Sumati, who dreams of getting a bicycle to commute to her school, many miles away from her village. To meet her modest need, she embarks on an journey marked by struggle, ambition, commitment, and friendship.

During her Journey Sumi befriends a local boy Chinmay who helps her find work and teaches her to ride.

Later in the film Sumi's savings gets stolen and she gets heartbroken and devastated. At this moment Chinmay helps Sumi to get over this hard time.

== Production ==
=== Development ===
While talking about the film SUMI, writer Sanjeev K Jha mentions in his interviews that "the story is very close to his own childhood experiences. He hails from Champaran, close to Gandhiji’s Ashram - where the concept of Ashram education first took shape. In the year 2002, during his own school days he used to see girls cycling the distance to their schools. But such girls were few. Only 1 or 2 compared to some 20 odd boys, and this was undoubtedly an act of bravery for the girls. This ‘Going to School’ childhood remained with the writer as did the lone girl riding a blue cycle in a group of 20 boys. This became the first visual of the film. After this, consciously and unconsciously, his childhood experiences kept bleeding into the film.

== Cast ==
- Akanksha Pingle as Sumati
- Divyesh Indulkar
- Smita Tambe

== Awards ==
Award	Category	Result	Official name
68th National Film Awards	Best Children's Film	Won	Golden Lotus Award (Swarna Kamal)
68th National Film Awards	Best Child Artist	Won	Silver Lotus Award (Rajat Kamal)
58th Maharashtra State Film Awards	Maharashtra State Film Award for Best Rural Film	Won	Maharashtra State Film Award for Best Rural Film
