= Warning (2013 film) =

2013 Indian film by Gurmmeet Singh

- Movie Poster
- Directed by: Gurmmeet Singh
- Screenplay by: Tejpal Singh Rawat; Rajesh Chawla
- Based on: Open Water 2: Adrift (2006 film)
- Produced by: Anubhav Sinha; Jitendra Jain
- Starring: Santosh Barmola; Madhurima Tuli; Manjari Fadnis; Varun Sharma; Jitin Gulati; Sumit suri
- Cinematography: Franz Pagot
- Edited by: Cheragh Todiwala
- Music by: Songs: Meet Bros Anjjan; Ankit; Toshi Sabri; John Stewart Eduri; Background Score: John Stewart Eduri
- Distributed by: Eros International; Alumbra Entertainment; Benaras Media Works
- Release date: 27 September 2013
- Country: India
- Language: Hindi

Warning is a 2013 Hindi adventure thriller 3D film directed by Gurmmeet Singh and produced by Anubhav Sinha and Jitendra Jain. The film was released on 27 September 2013 and features Madhurima Tuli, Santosh Barmola, Suzana Rodrigues and Manjari Fadnis as main characters.

Warning is a remake of the 2006 German English-language psychological horror thriller Open Water 2: Adrift.

== Cast ==
- Santosh Barmola - Taranjit Singh Bakshi
- Madhurima Tuli - Gunjan Dutta
- Manjari Fadnis - Sabina Sanyal
- Varun Sharma - Anshul Pandey
- Jitin Gulati - Deepak Sharma
- Sumit Suri - Aman Puri
- Suzana Rodrigues - Jeanine
- James (Nagar Baul)

== Soundtrack ==
The music was composed by Toshi Sabri, Meet Bros, John Stewart and released by Sony Music India.

Warning

Soundtrack album by Toshi Sabri Meet Bros Anjjan John Stewart
- Released: Sep 14, 2013
- Recorded: 2013
- Genre: Soundtrack
- Length: 28:07
- Label: Sony Music India
- Producers: Toshi Sabri; Meet Bros Anjjan; John Stewart

Track list
No.	Title	Lyrics	Music	Singer(s)	Length
1.	"Bebasi"	Kumaar	Meet Bros Anjjan	James, Aditi Paul, Ranjit Barot, Meet Bros Anjjan	7:06
2.	"Tell Me How Much"	Kumaar	Toshi Sabri	Poorbi, Mika Singh, Toshi Sabri	3:24
3.	"Taakeedein"	Irfan Siddiqui	John Stewart	John Stewart, Sonu Nigam, Illhama Qasimova	6:16
4.	"Chikadanga"	Kumaar	Toshi Sabri	Varun Sharma, Toshi Sabri, Manjari Fadnis, Madhurima Tuli, John Stewart	3:40
5.	"Chikadanga" (DubStep)	Kumaar	Toshi Sabri	Varun Sharma, Toshi Sabri, Manjari Fadnis Madhurima Tuli, John Stewart	3:41
6.	"It's a Warning" (Mashup)	Irfan Siddiqui, Kumaar		James, Poorbi, Aditi Paul, Mika Singh, Toshi Sabri, Meet Bros, Manjari Fadnis, Madhurima Tuli, John Stewart	4:00
Total length:					28:07
