= Muthirai =

- Poster
- Directed by: Srinath
- Written by: Aneez Tanveer Jeeva
- Produced by: Vikram Bhatt; Surendra Sharma; Amita Bishnoi; Bhagwanti Gabrani
- Starring: Daniel Balaji; Nithin Sathya; Lakshmi Rai; Manjari Phadnis
- Cinematography: Saleem
- Edited by: Anthony
- Music by: Yuvan Shankar Raja
- Production companies: ASA Production & Enterprises Pvt. Ltd. Vision Jeeva Studios
- Release date: 19 June 2009
- Running time: 132 minutes
- Country: India
- Language: Tamil

Muthirai (transl. Stamp) is a 2009 Indian Tamil-language action thriller film written by Aneez Tanveer Jeeva, wife of late director Jeeva, and directed by Srinath, starring Daniel Balaji, Nithin Sathya, Lakshmi Rai and newcomer Manjari Fadnis, whilst Kishore, Saravanan, Ponvannan, Anand, Cochin Hanifa, and Chetan play supporting roles. The film was released on 19 June 2009.

== Plot ==
Politician Azhagar Adhiyaman's party wins in the Tamil Nadu Assembly elections. Azhagar Adhiyaman, his brother Azhagar Thondaiman, and the senior party leader Aadhikesavan discuss the posts to be held. Discussions turn into gunfire, during which all three of them get shot. Azhagar Adhiyaman dies, Azhagar Thondaiman falls into a coma, and Aadhikesavan is left with an injury. The state is brought under temporary Governor's rule until the party chooses the new CM.

Sathya and his accomplice Azhagu are highly successful petty thieves. Azhagu marries Kavyanjali once for money (under the mass-marriage programme). Kavya's father tries to make money with his daughter. Azhagu realises his mistake and tries to convince Kavya. Sathya cheats a woman named Aarthi by saying he is a CBI officer and makes her fall in love with him. Sathya and Azhagu live in an apartment opposite Krishna's residence.

The commissioner is appointed as the investigating officer for the case, and he finds that Krishna knows some information about the firing in which Azhagar Adhiyaman was killed. He traces Krishna's residence and chases him. At the same time, in the opposite apartment, Sathya, Azhagu, and Aarthi host a birthday party for Kavya so that Azhagu and Kavya can get together again. Krishna enters their house to escape from the police, and all five of them start running away from the police. While the police chase them, Azhagu, Kavya, Sathya, and Aarthi try to escape. Krishna also tries to get in the car and drops his laptop there.

Four of them flee and seek refuge in a hideout. They take out the laptop to find that Aadhikesavan has shot Azhagar Adhiyaman and Azhagar Thondaiman, and Aadhikesavan then shoots and injures himself. Azhagu calls up the commissioner to hand over the witness. However, Aadhikesavan's men attack them in their hideout, and Azhagu thinks that it is the commissioner's men. Later, he calls Aadhikesavan and demands a ransom in exchange for the laptop. He also checks the commissioner's credit card transactions and mobile phone calls and finds that the commissioner has been illegally receiving money from Azhagar Thondaiman, who appointed the commissioner.

In the climax, Sathya comes to collect money from Aadhikesavan, where the commissioner also turns up unexpectedly. Azhagu comes with Azhagar Thondaiman, who was in the hospital. Azhagar Thondaiman explains his side of the story, that he also tried to kill his brother and had worn a bulletproof jacket to avoid getting shot. Krishna was a man he appointed to photograph the events. A fight happens, where the commissioner kills Aadhikesavan. When Sathya and Azhagu try to escape with the money, other police officers encounter them, shoot the commissioner, and arrest Azhagar Thondaiman. In the meantime, Sathya and Azhagu escape with the money and wish the other police officers good luck with their careers.

== Cast ==
- Daniel Balaji as Azhagu
- Nithin Sathya as Sathyamoorthy
- Lakshmi Rai as Kavyanjali
- Manjari Fadnis as Aarthi
- Kishore as Commissioner Muthuselvan
- Saravanan as Azhagar Adhiyaman
- Ponvannan as Aadhikesavan
- Anand as Azhagar Thondaiman
- Cochin Hanifa as Kavya's father
- Chetan as Krishna
- Riyaz Khan as Aadhikesavan's assistant
- Ajay Rathnam as Dhanraj
- Nellai Siva as MLA
- Prajin as Police Inspector
- Chaams as Traveller
- Rakhi Sawant in an item number "The Night is Still Young"

== Production ==
Muthirai is the first film produced by Vision Jeeva Studios. Aneez Tanveer Jeeva, widow of late director Jeeva, started the production company and named it after her deceased husband. She also wrote the screenplay and Srinath, a former assistant to Jeeva, agreed to direct the film. Srinath, primarily an actor, made his directorial debut and rejected several acting offers to do this film. Lakshmi Rai, who earlier appeared in Jeeva's Dhaam Dhoom was cast as one of the lead actresses and Manjari Fadnis' appearance in Jaane Tu... Ya Jaane Na along with her emerging popularity were contributing factors to her casting. Aneez never considered directing the film herself, feeling it was too early to do so and opted to focus on handling production duties instead. The film was launched in May 2008.

== Soundtrack ==
The soundtrack was composed by Yuvan Shankar Raja, and released on 7 May 2009 at Sathyam Cinemas by Gautham Vasudev Menon. Fadnis, a Maharashtrian by birth, sang one of the songs, the first time in Tamil.

Song	Singer(s)	Lyricist	Duration
"Om Shanthi Om"	Neha Bhasin	Na. Muthukumar	4:44
"Azhagana Neeyum"	Naresh Iyer, Manjari Fadnis	Snehan	5:06
"Night Is Still Young"	Krish, Benny Dayal, Preethi	Pa. Vijay	4:42
"July Madhathil"	Mohd. Aslam, Rahul Nambiyar, Tanvi Shah, Priya	Na. Muthukumar	4:21
"Uyire Uyire"	Javed Ali, Madhushree	Snehan	5:08
"Nenjukulla"	Shweta Mohan	Snehan	2:32
"Om Shanthi Om" (Remix)	Neha Bhasin	Na. Muthukumar	5:11
"Night Is Still Young" (Remix)	Krish, Benny Dayal, Preethi	Pa. Vijay	4:35

== Release and reception ==
Muthirai was released on 19 June 2009. Pavithra Srinivasan of Rediff.com wrote, "Halfway through the film though, you begin to realize that despite a rather nice cast, comedian-turned-director Srinath seems to have lost track of whatever Hollywood screenplay he burglarised and settled down with a half-baked desi version." Malathi Rangarajan of The Hindu wrote, "For a better impact, the unravelling of the plot could have been more comprehensible and spaced out". The New Indian Express wrote, "On the whole, Muthirai is a film that promised a lot and lived some what on paper". Sify wrote, "Antony seems to have lost his magic touch as an editor. Still the film is engrossing in bits and pieces – Srinath has a winner due to his packaging and slick styling".
