= Anant Kumar (author) =

German author, translator and literary critic

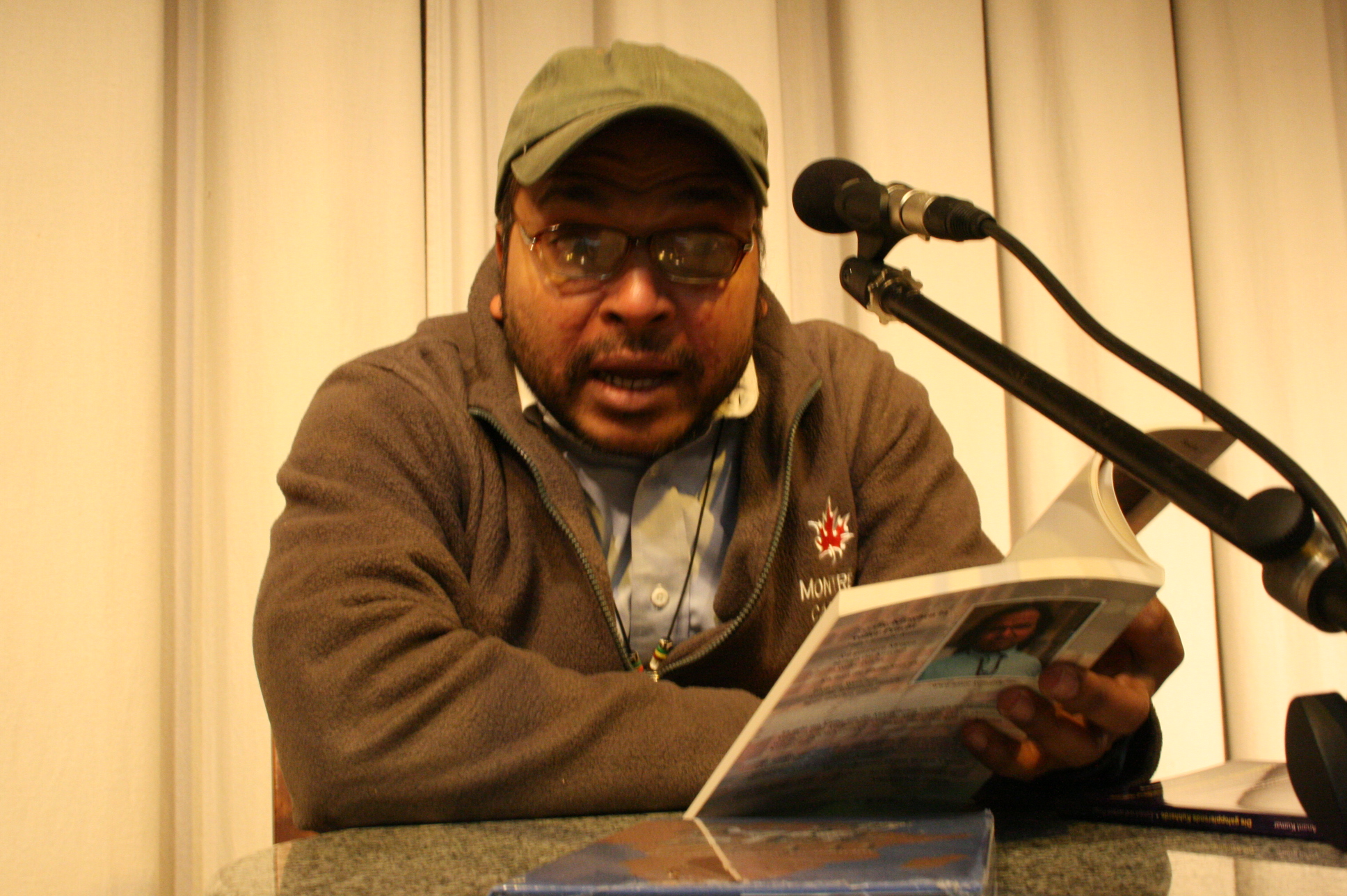
Anant Kumar.

Anant Kumar (born September 28, 1969 in Katihar/Bihar), is a German author, translator and literary critic of Indian descent. He spent his childhood in Motihari, where his father Rajendra Prasad was Professor at M. S. College, Babasaheb Bhimrao Ambedkar Bihar University. He resides in Kassel, Germany. In 2024 he was counted among the representative citizens in the city Kassel.

== Life ==
The son of an Indian teacher from Bihar, Kumar went to college from 1991 to 1998 at the GHK (Gesamthochschule Kassel), where he received a master's degree in German literature, writing his thesis on Alfred Döblin’s epic novel Manas.

In his literary works, Kumar connects the experiences of a foreigner in German society with Indian culture. His first work, Fremde Frau, fremder Mann (Foreign Woman, Foreign Man), is characterized by its pithy insights and expressive perceptiveness. The aspects of observational satire and finely ironic comment are constant elements throughout Kumar’s work. In his work Zeru—A Seven Day Story Kumar alludes to the literary form of the epos and brilliantly depicts the colorful array of daily life for an African boy amid wild and ancient myths of the dark continent.

Anant Kumar is a member of the Association of German Authors and the Literary Society of Hessen.

== Works ==
=== In German ===
==== Novel ====
- Berlin-Bombay. Aus dem Leben von Dipak Talgeri und Eva Seilmeyer Verlag auf der Warft, Münster 2016, ISBN 3-939211-16-8.
- Berlin-Bombay. Die Karriere eines Lehrers, dessen Leben als Hochstapler zugrunde ging Anthea Verlag, Berlin 2020, ISBN 978-3-899983-49-4.

==== Poetry ====
- Fremde Frau – fremder Mann: Ein Inder dichtet in Kassel. Wiesenburg-Verlag, Schweinfurt 1997, ISBN 3-932497-00-7
- Kasseler Texte: Gedichte, Kurzgeschichten, Beobachtungen, Glossen, Skizzen, Reflexionen. Wiesenburg-Verlag, Schweinfurt 1998, ISBN 3-932497-12-0
- ARCHETYPUS. EPLA-Verlag, Ganderkesee 2011, ISBN 978-3-940554-61-1
- AYSE. custos verlag, Solingen 2020, ISBN 978-3-943195-33-0

==== Prose ====
- Die Inderin: Prosa. Wiesenburg-Verlag, Schweinfurt 1999, ISBN 3-932497-32-5
- Die galoppierende Kuhherde: Essays und andere Prosa. Wiesenburg-Verlag, Schweinfurt 2001, ISBN 3-932497-58-9
- Die uferlosen Geschichten. Wiesenburg-Verlag, Schweinfurt 2003, ISBN 3-937101-04-7
- Drei Kilo Hühne : Grotesken, Glossen, Satiren. Fünf-Finger-Ferlag, Leipzig 2005, ISBN 3-9808934-5-6
- Indien I: Süß. IATROS-Verlag, Mainz 2006 ISBN 3-937439-48-X
- Indien II: Sauer. IATROS-Verlag, Mainz 2006, ISBN 3-937439-49-8
- Ein Inder in Deutschland. Wiesenburg-Verlag, Schweinfurt 2008, ISBN 978-3-939518-91-4
- Ibiza: Gespräche, Gedichte und Betrachtungen. Projekte-Verlag, Halle (Saale) 2013, ISBN 9783954863310
- FRIDO - Eine Deutsche Stimme. Der Neue Morgen, Rudolstadt 2013, ISBN 9783954800353
- Chili Chicken. chiliverlag, Verl 2015, ISBN 978-3-943292-27-5

==== Children Books ====
- ... und ein Stück für Dich: Ein Bilderbuch für Kinder und Erwachsene. Geest-Verlag, Ahlhorn 2000, ISBN 3-934852-29-7
- Zeru: Eine siebentägige Geschichte. Wiesenburg-Verlag, Schweinfurt 2005, ISBN 3-937101-78-0
- Der Mond und seine Langeweile: Ein Bilder- und Malbuch für die großen und kleinen Kinder & für das Kind im Erwachsenen. Epla-Verlag, Ganderkesee 2009, ISBN 978-3-940554-29-1
- Halli Galli in Gotha. chiliverlag, Verl 2015, ISBN 978-3-943292-34-3

==== Non fiction ====
- Indien: Eine Weltmacht! mit inneren Schwächen. 13 Essays $ Kolumnen. Der Neue Morgen, Rudolstadt 2012, ISBN 978-3954800216
- Blicke auf Gotha, Kumars Gothaer Kolumnen: Deutschland von Innen und Außen. Stadtverwaltung Gotha, Gotha 2015
- Ostdeutschland ist Viefalt, Essays-Reportagen-Gedichte., Berlin 2019, ISBN 9783943583199.

=== In English ===
- Stories Without Borders. Wiesenburg-Verlag, Schweinfurt 2010, ISBN 3-942063-41-7
- The Boredom of the Moon. Epla, Ganderkesee 2014, ISBN 978-3-940554-29-1
- AYSE. custos verlag, Solingen 2020, ISBN 978-3-943195-33-0

== Awards ==
- 2000: Talk and symposium on contemporary literature “Poetry & Short Prose”, BBS Osterholz-Scharmbeck in cooperation with literary institution Friedrich-Bödecker-Kreis, Lower Saxony
- 2002: Finalist in the Würth-Literatur-Preis, (Tübingen Poetry-Lectureship)
- 2003: Poeticus-Shortshtory-Preis, Spittal an der Drau, Austria
- 2003: Scholarship from Stiftung kunst:raum sylt quelle, Sylt
- 2004: Finalist, May-Ayim-Award (Poetry), Berlin
- 2006: Rudolf-Descher-Feder, Annual Award from Association of Authors IGdA e. V.
- 2010: Finalist, 14th Short Story Contest, h+s veranstaltungen GmbH, Munich
- 2011: Grant/Scholarship from Ministry of Science and Culture, State of Hess, Germany for the collection of stories “FRIDO – A German Voice”, scheduled in Fall 2011
- 2012: Finalist, Geertje Potash-Suhr Prize for prose in German, SCALG, Colorado
- 2013: “Adjunct Visiting Lecturer II”, German Summer School, Taos, The University of New Mexico in consortium with California State University Long Beach, 25. Juni 25 – 26. July
- 2014: Work Grant from Ministry of Science and Culture, State of Hess, Germany for the novel “DIPAK TALGRI`s COLLAPSE”, scheduled in Winter 2014-15
- 2015: Resident Writer Award of Royal City Gotha, Free State of Thuringia, Germany
- 2016: Winner Short Story Contest „Keller, Schlüssel“, Ruhrliteratur, Bochum, Germany
- 2016: Grant/Scholarship “Dramatic and Essayistic writing”, Summer School, Velturno, Italy
- 2016: 1st Finalist, Siegfried-Pater-Prize(Mouthpiece for Justice), Retap Publishing, Düsseldorf, Germany
- 2017: Resident Writer "Autorencamp", Cologne Muehlheim
- 2017: University of Wuerzburg, Dept. of English, LITERATURE IN A GLOBALIZED WORLD: CREATIVE AND CRITICAL PERSPECTIVES
- 2020: Grant/Scholarship "AYSE" (Alhambra-Poetry), Ministry of Science and Culture, State of Hess, Germany
- 2021: Grant/Scholarship "IN PANDEMIC TIMES / IN ZEITEN der PANDEMIE" (Essay), Hessische Kulturstiftung, Germany
