= Motihari College of Engineering =

Engineering college in Bihar

Motihari College of Engineering, Motihari
- Former names: Indian College of Engineering Motihari
- Type: State Government
- Established: 1980 (46 years ago)
- Affiliations: Bihar Engineering University
- Principal: Prof. (Dr.) Navneet Kumar, PhD IIT Delhi
- Academic staff: 47
- Administrative staff: 35
- Undergraduates: 960
- Location: (India) Motihari, Bihar, India
- Campus: SubUrban
- Nickname: MCE Motihari
- Website: www.mcemotihari.ac.in

Motihari College of Engineering, Motihari is a Government Engineering College fully funded by the government of Bihar, India. It is managed by Department of Science and Technology (Bihar) and Technical Education, along with 38 Government Engineering Colleges of Bihar. The college is affiliated to Bihar Engineering University, Patna and approved by AICTE, Delhi.

== History ==
Previously the institute was known as Indian College of Engineering-Motihari and was established in 1980. In 1994 all staffs and students were transferred to other engineering colleges of Bihar and the institute was shut down due to some political reason. Later in November 2008, the Government reopen the institute & the name was changed from Indian College of Engineering to Motihari College of Engineering.

== Campus ==
Motihari College of Engineering has a 48-acre campus at Bairiya Fursatpur, Motihari, East-Champaran district of Bihar in India.

== Departments ==
Department	Seats (UG)
Computer Science with Artificial intelligence Engineering	60
Computer Science and Engineering	60
Mechanical Engineering	60
Electrical & Electronics Engineering	60
Civil Engineering	60
Civil with Computer Applications Engineering	60

Additional 12 seats (2nd year onward) is also sanctioned by AICTE for Lateral Entry students for all trades especially for Diploma holder or B.Sc. students.

== Academics ==
=== Admissions ===
Since 2019, admissions are being taken by UGEAC-BCECEB, which considers JEE-Main merit list as the scoring criterion. Students desirous to take admissions must appear in JEE-Main Exam, conducted by National Testing Agency (NTA). Earlier, UG admissions were made through the Bihar Combined Entrance Competitive Examination(BCECE) conducted by Bihar Combined Entrance Competitive Examination Board, Under Bihar Combined Entrance Competitive Examination Act, 1995 of Bihar government. Although, any student to get admitted in any of the engineering colleges located in Bihar, which uses UGEAC as the admission norm, requires the student to be a bonafide resident of Bihar.

=== Curriculum ===
The B. Tech. program consists of eight semesters spread over four academic years. Motihari College of Engineering is affiliated to Bihar Engineering University, Patna. M.Tech. in Computer Science & Engineering and other specialization is expected to start from upcoming academic year after getting mandatory approval from AICTE-New Delhi.

== See also ==
- List of institutions of higher education in Bihar
- Education in Patna
- Education in Bihar
- Education in India
