= Wah Taj =

- Theatrical release poster
- Directed by: Ajit Sinha
- Written by: M. Salim
- Produced by: Pawan Sharma; Abhinav Verma
- Starring: Shreyas Talpade; Manjari Fadnis; Hemant Pandey; Rajesh Sharma; Yusuf Hussain; Govind Pandey; Rajeev Verma; Prachee Pathak
- Cinematography: Uttam Dhakal
- Edited by: Irfan Ishak
- Music by: Songs: Vipin Patwa; Jaidev Kumar; Gaurav Dagaonkar; Background Score: Sanjay Wandrekar
- Production companies: Pun Films; SpyderWave Films
- Release date: 23 September 2016
- Running time: 125 min
- Country: India
- Language: Hindi

Wah Taj (transl. Wow, Taj!) is a 2016 Indian Hindi drama film directed by Ajit Sinha, and produced by Pawan Sharma and Abhinav Verma under the banners of Pen Films Pvt. Ltd. and SpyderWave Films. It features Shreyas Talpade and Manjari Fadnis in the lead roles. The film was released worldwide on 23 September 2016. It was declared tax-free in Uttar Pradesh on 22 September 2016.

== Plot ==
It's a sunny day in Agra. People are getting ready to head off to work while tourists are lining up at the Taj Mahal. But outside Taj Mahal, the atmosphere is different.

Tukaram Marathe, his wife Sundari, and their daughter have laid claim to the land on which Taj Mahal stands. Tukaram says the land belonged to his ancestors and demands it back. His claim is relayed by the media, and this puts the authorities in action. The jail minister, Visarjan Yadav, is sent to sort things out, but he ends up making matters worse. Tukaram and Sundari refuse to back down and sit on a hunger strike on the Yamuna plains.

Repeated attempts from Yadav and the Chief Minister yield no results, and the case goes to court. Here, Tukaram is asked to present proof of his claim. He presents letters from Emperors Humayun and Akbar addressed to his ancestors, and after testing, it appears that the letters are authentic. Till the matter is in court, Tukaram asks for the Taj Mahal to be shut down for tourists.

After much deliberation, Tukaram and Sundari strike a deal with the government. They ask to be given land elsewhere in the country for farming. This demand is granted, but the problem doesn't end there. The land they randomly select belongs to a big industrialist who is not willing to let go of it. Unable to armtwist the government, the industrialist hires a killer to finish Tukaram.

== Cast ==
- Shreyas Talpade as Tukaram Raosaheb Marathe (Fake) / Advocate Vivek Tupkari
- Manjari Fadnis as Sunanda "Sundari" Marathe, Tukaram's wife (Fake) / Rhea, Vivek's girlfriend
- Hemant Pandey as Visarjan Yadav; Jail Minister of Uttar Pradesh
- Rajesh Sharma
- Rajeev Verma as Judge
- Vishwajeet Pradhan as Aditya Virani
- Rakesh Shrivastav
- Prachee Pathak as Rehana Kazmi
- Yusuf Hussain as Chief Minister of Uttar Pradesh
- Sunil Shakya
- Shailendra Jain
- Govind Pandey as Inspector Brajesh Singh

== Production ==
Wah Taj was shot primarily in Agra and Bhopal with a short schedule in Mumbai. The shooting of the movie was wrapped up in June, 2013 & was earlier slated for a release towards late 2013.

== Reception ==
Times of India provided it 2.5/5 rating and wrote, "Wah Taj aims to put focus on the pitiable conditions of farmers and the devil-may-care approach of the government machinery".

== Soundtrack ==
The music was released on 7 September 2016 by Zee Music Company.

All music is composed by Gaurav Dagaonkar, Jaidev Kumar & Vipin Patwa.

Track listing
| No. | Title | Lyrics | Singer(s) | Length |
|---|---|---|---|---|
| 1. | "Kanha Mere Kanha" | Dr Sagar | Arpita Mukherjee, Deepali Sathe, Manjira Ganguly, Pratibha Singh Baghel, Vipin Patwa | 3:01 |
| 2. | "Tu Hi Bata Mere Khuda" | Dr Sagar | Bhanu Pratap Singh, Humsar Hayat, Javed Bashir, Vipin Patwa | 4:27 |
| 3. | "Murga Bole" | Kumaar | Tochi Raina | 3:27 |
| 4. | "Chhori Chhichhori" | Guru Thakur | Aakanksha Sharma, Adarsh Shinde | 4:02 |
| Total length: | | | | 17 minutes |
