= Ramesh Chandra Jha =

Indian poet, novelist and freedom fighter

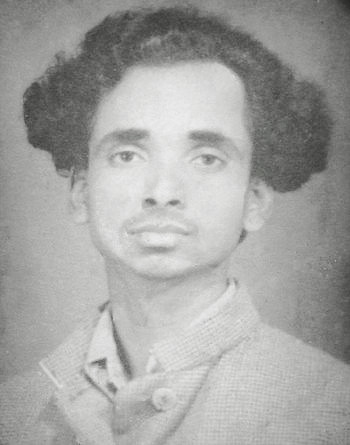
- Born: 8 May 1928; Motihari, Bihar and Orissa Province, British India (now in Motihari, Bihar, India)
- Died: 7 April 1994 (aged 65); Motihari, Bihar, India
- Occupations: Poet, novelist, journalist, freedom fighter
- Spouse: Suryamukhi Devi
- Children: Vinayak Jha, Rita Devi
- Parent: Laxminarayan Jha [Freedom Fighter]
- Relatives: Sanjeev K Jha (mat. grandson) Anuranjan Jha (Brother's grandson)
- Writing career
- Language: Hindi, Bhojpuri, Maithili, Sanskrit
- Period: 1950s–1970s
- Notable works: यह देश है वीर जवानों का, स्वागतिका, वत्सराज, मुरलिका, प्रियंवदा

Ramesh Chandra Jha(8 May 1928 – 7 April 1994) was an Indian poet, novelist and freedom fighter. Son of a senior Gandhian and freedom fighter Lakshmi Narayan Jha, who also contributed in Indian Freedom Struggle from Bihar. His maternal grandson Sanjeev K Jha is a well-known screenwriter who is working in Indian film industry. Ramesh Chandra Jha's poems, ghazals and stories often evoke patriotism and human values. Romanticism and struggle of life are also important aspects of his writing. His poetry expresses concerns of people's life struggle, their dreams and hopes.

His research based books including Champaran Ki Sahitya Sadhana (चम्पारन की साहित्य साधना) (1958), Champaran: Literature & Literary Writers (चम्पारन: साहित्य और साहित्यकार) (1967) and Apne Aur Sapne: A Literary Journey Of Champaran (अपने और सपने: चम्पारन की साहित्य यात्रा) (1988) meticulously document the rich literary heritage and history of Champaran, Bihar. These seminal books continue to serve as foundational reference points for researchers, scholars, Ph.D. students, and journalists alike. Jha's exploration and preservation of Champaran's historical and literary legacy have solidified his place as a cornerstone in the field of literary research.

== Life history ==
Ramesh Chandra Jha was born on 8 May 1928 in Fulwariya village of Sugauli in East Champaran district, known as Motihari, Bihar. His father, Laxmi Narayan Jha, was a patriot and freedom fighter who fought against British rule and was arrested many times, including on 15 April 1917 when Mahatma Gandhi visited Champaran for his Satyagrah movement. Influenced by these events, Ramesh Chandra Jha became active in nationalist activities from an early age. At the age of 14, he was convicted of robbery in connection with the movement. While imprisoned, he frequently caused disturbances and became a source of difficulty for the British officers.

== Life as Freedom Fighter ==
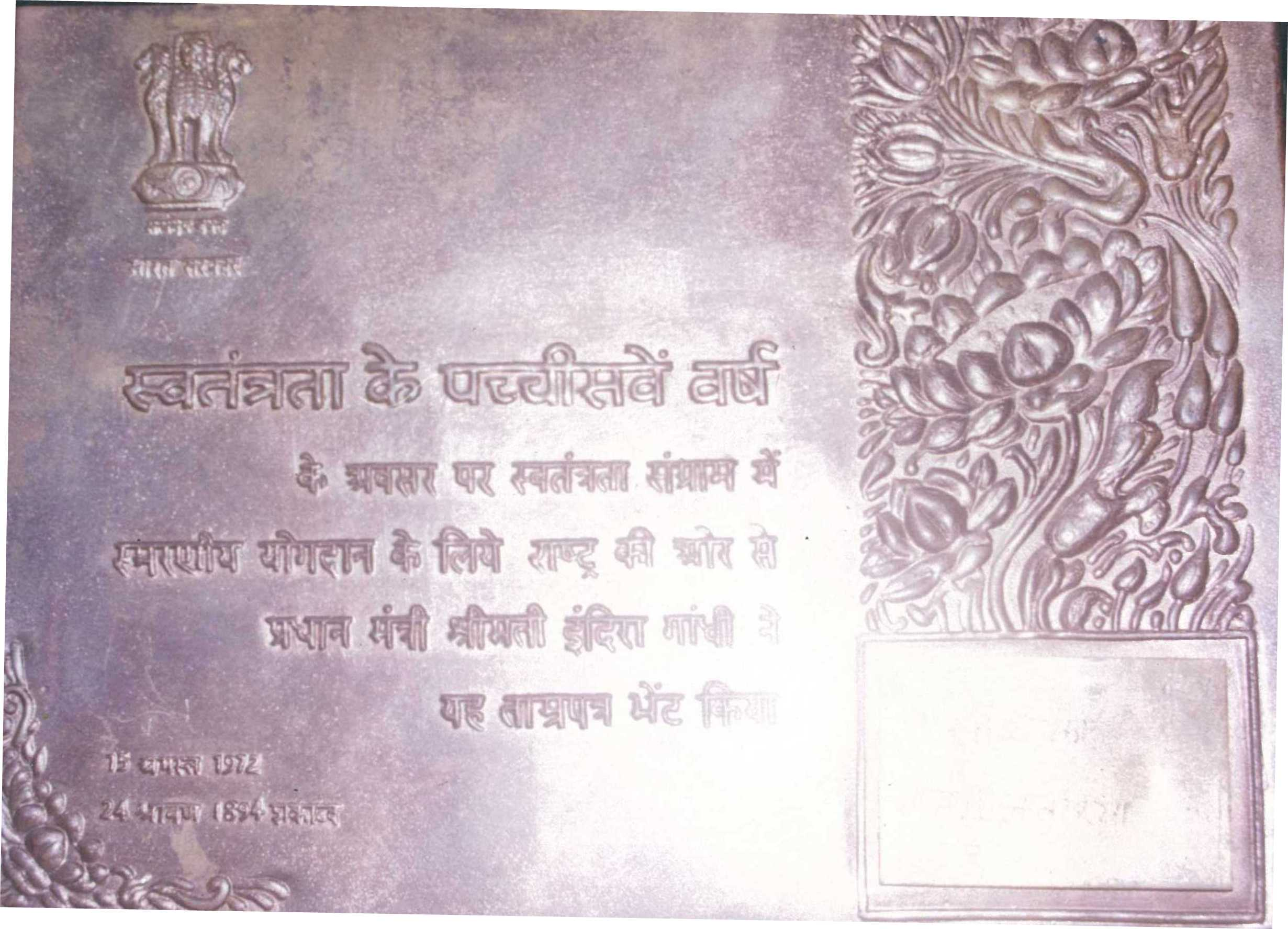
Tamra Patra honoured by Smt. Indira Gandhi

Ramesh Chandra Jha went to jail many times during British rule because of his involvement in the Quit India Movement. At that time, he was a student of Hazarimal High School, Raxaul. He was entrapped into several cases of the robbery at police stations during freedom struggle. In his school days he led student protest and was later thrown out from the school.

S. R. Bakshi and Ritu Chaturvedi in his research based book have said that

At his phulwariya village in great hardship, Gokul Thakur ordered Ramesh Chandra and Rama Kant Jha to go to Sugaon and to take account of the articles were removed and also the condition of imposed collective fines. Since both these persons view of prematured age, there was not much possibility of their being arrested. But both of them were arrested happily and imprisoned for two years under the Section 38(v) of the Indian safety act...

Renowned litterateur Kanhiyalal Prabhakar Mishra writes about Ramesh Chandra Jha in the preface to a book, "The history of Ramesh Chandra Jha and his family is like laughing aloud in the face of ruin during the freedom struggle. He is among those who themselves put handcuffs to break the shackles of slavery. He also enjoyed the life of a dreaded absconder and is among those who did not get freedom but earned it."

While serving his jail term, he was drawn to reading Indian and world literature. After coming out of prison, he became a poet and author instead of joining any political party.

== Works and literature ==
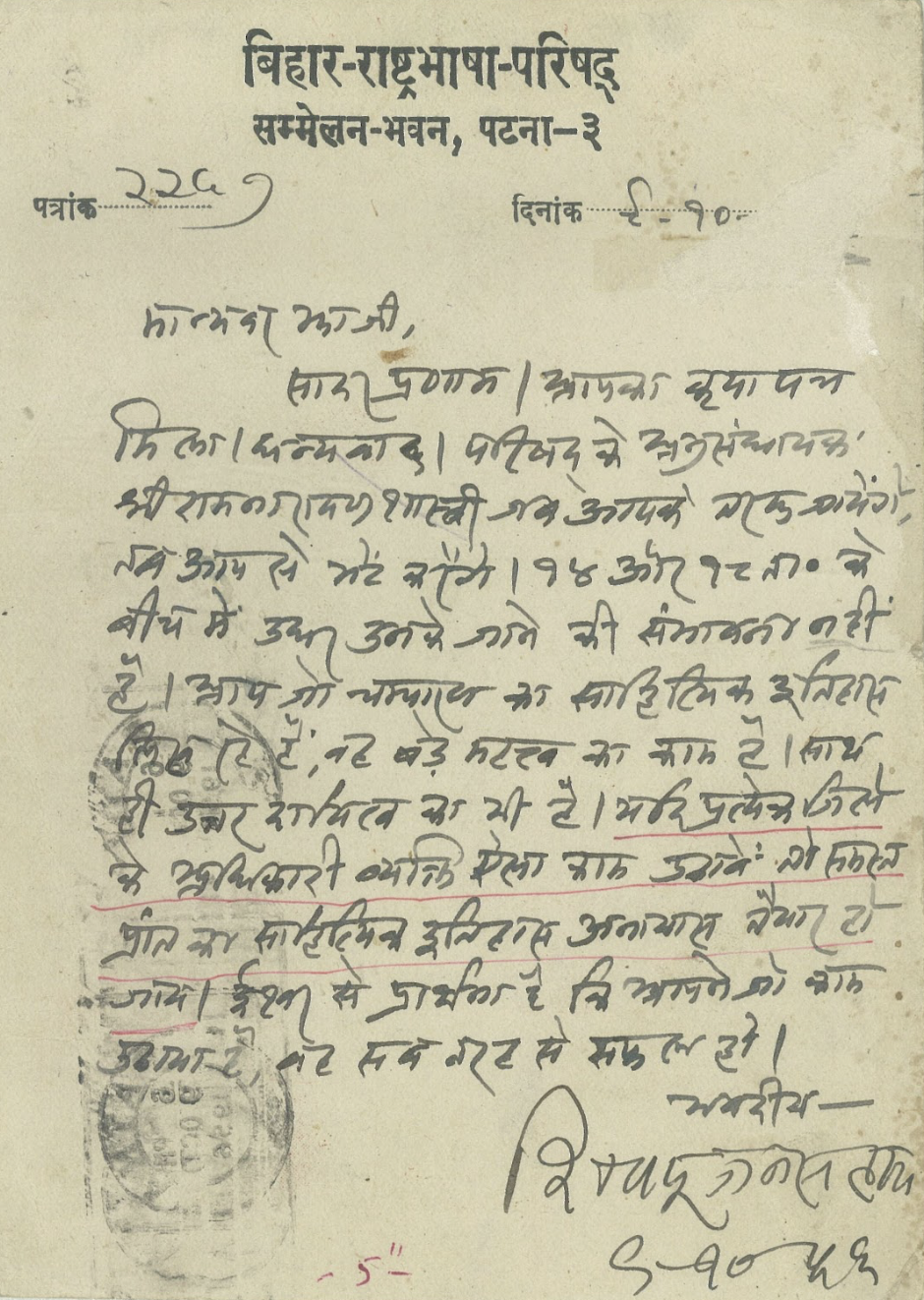
Acharya Shivpujan Sahay's letter to R.C.Jha

Ramesh Chandra Jha worked across various literary genres and forms. While his body of work is diverse, it predominantly reflects themes of patriotism, Chhayavad (Romanticism or Shadowism), and historical or period narratives.

The eminent poet and freedom fighter Rambriksh Benipuri, who were very close the Ramesh Jha once wrote:

"With Dinkar, a new wave of poets emerged in Bihar, but its fate turned out to be quite peculiar. One searches for the new sprouts that were expected to follow. Occasionally, a few fresh buds seem to peek through the dense layers of the earth. Ramesh is one such bud, and he belongs to my home—he is one of us. Affection and favoritism, I hear, often go hand in hand, yet even so, affection cannot be forsaken, nor can the bonds of love be broken! Favoritism it may be, but without hesitation, I will say that I have always deeply appreciated Ramesh’s works."

== Honours and awards ==
- 15 August 1972, on the 25th anniversary of Indian independence, Indira Gandhi awarded him with Tamra Patra for his participation in the Indian freedom struggle.
- Awarded by Dr Uday Narayan Tiwari Award on 2 October 1993 at the National Bhojpuri Language Summit in Raniganj, West Bengal.
- Ramesh Chandra Jha’s Bhojpuri poem has been included in the textbook of Bhojpuri by the Bihar government.

== Ramesh Chandra Jha Memorial Award ==
On 04-5 March 2016 on the occasion of completing 200 years of Treaty of Sugauli BHOR Organization had conducted Sugauli Sandhi Samaroh 2016. In this festival an important historical book about Sugauli and its past, Swadheenta Samar Mein Sugauli, had been launched and the Ramesh Chandra Jha Smriti Samman for writer and journalist had been awarded.

On 4 March 2016 the journalist Arvind Mohan, ex-DGP (Uttar Pradesh) and the former Vice-Chancellor of Mahatma Gandhi Antarrashtriya Hindi Vishwavidyalaya, Vibhuti Narain Rai, along with many other special guests, launched Ramesh Chandra Jha's historical book titled Swadheenta Samar Mein Sugauli.

Bhor Charitable Trust conducted 2nd Bhor Literature Festival 2017 on the occasion of 100 Years of famous Gandhi's Champaran Satyagrah. This event was held at historical Phulwaria village (Birth Place of Ramesh Chandra Jha) of Champaran on 15–16 April 2017, during the festival 2nd Ramesh Chandra Jha Smriti Samman was given to Laxmi Shankar Bajpai. Bhor has Started Guruvar Dinesh Chandra Jha Bhor Rural olympiad. BRO for rural school children. In the year 2017 it has given to 12 students of Champaran region. Guruvar Dinesh Chandra Jha was the renowned teacher and younger brother of Ramesh Chandra Jha.

== Major literary works ==
Poetry Collection (काव्य-संग्रह)

- Murlika, (मुरलिका)
- Priyamvada (प्रियंवदा-खण्ड काव्य),
- Swagatika, (स्वगातिका)
- Megh-geet, (मेघ-गीत)
- Aag-phool, (आग-फूल)
- Bharat Desh Humara, (भारत देश हमारा)
- Jawaan Jagte Raho, (जवान जागते रहो)
- Marichika, (मरीचिका)
- Jai Bharat Jai Gandhi, (जय भारत जय गांधी)
- Jai Bolo Hindustan Ki, (जय बोलो हिन्दुस्तान की)
- Priyadarshni (प्रियदर्शनी-श्रद्धा काव्य)
- Deep Jalta Raha, (दीप चलता रहा)
- Challo-Dilli, (चलो-दिल्ली)
- Neel Ke Daag (नील के दाग)

Historical Novel (ऐतिहासिक उपन्यास)

- Durg Ka Ghera (दुर्ग का घेरा) [प्र० व०- 1958,सुभाष पुस्तक मंडल, बनारस]
- Majaar Ka Diya, (मजार का दीया) [प्र० व०- 1962, चौधरी एंड संस, बनारस]
- Mitti Bol Uthi (मिट्टी बोल उठी) [प्र० व०- 1962, चौधरी एंड संस, बनारस]
- Rao-Hammir, (राव हम्मीर) [प्र० व०- 1963, सुभाष पुस्तक मंडल, बनारस]
- Vatsraj,
- Kunvar Singh, (कुंवर सिंह)
- Kaling Ka Lahu (कलिंग का लहू)

Patriotic Work (राष्ट्रीय साहित्य)

- Yah Desh Hai Veer Jawanon Ka (Poetry Collection) (यह देश है वीर जवानों का)
- Swadheenta Samar Mein:Sugauli (Prose) (स्वाधीनता समर में:सुगौली)

Social-Political Novel (सामाजिक-राजनीतिक उपन्यास)

- Dharti Ki Dhool (धरती की धुल)
- Jeevan-Daan (जीवन-दान) [प्र० व०- 1955, चौधरी एंड संस, कलकत्ता]
- Roop Ki Rakh (रूप की राख)
- Paas Ki Duri (पास की दूरी)
- Meera Nachi Re (मीरा नाची रे)
- Kaante Aur Kaliyan (काँटे और कलियाँ) [सुभाष पुस्तक मंडल, बनारस]

Children's Literature (बाल साहित्य)

- Sone Ka Kangan (सोने का कंगन)
- Chanda Ka Doot (चंदा का दूत)
- Bandar Lala (बन्दर लाला)
- Kehte Chalo Sunte Chalo (कहते चलो सुनते चलो)
- Inse Sikho Inse Jano (इनसे सीखो इनसे जानो)
- Kavita Bhari Kahaani (कविता भरी कहानी)
- Naya Desh Nai Kahani (नया देश नई कहानी)
- Gata Chal Bajata Chal (गाता चल बजाता चल)
- Kaisi Rahi Kahaani (कैसी रही कहानी)
- Aao Suno Kahaani (आओ सुनो कहानी)
- Ek Samay Ki Baat(Novel) (एक समय की बात)
- Aage Kadam Badhao (आगे कदम बढाओ)
- Bachho Suno Kahaani (बच्चो सुनो कहानी)
- Aao Padhte Jao (आओ पढ़ते जाओ)

Autobiographical Novel (आत्मकथात्मक उपन्यास)

- Vidyapati (विद्यापति)
- Bharat Putri (भारत-पुत्री)

Research Work (शोध कार्य)

- Champaran Ki Sahitya Sadhana (चम्पारन की साहित्य साधना) (1958)
- Apne Aur Sapne:A Literary Journey Of Champaran (अपने और सपने: चम्पारन की साहित्य यात्रा) (1988)
- Champaran:Literature & Literary Writers (चम्पारन: साहित्य और साहित्यकार) (1967)

Bhojpuri Novel (भोजपुरी उपन्यास)

- Surma Sagun Bichare Na (भोजपुरी का पहला धारावाहिक उपन्यास)

== See also ==
- List of Indian poets
- List of Indian writers
- Bihari literature
- List of people from Bihar
