= Inspector Avinash =

Indian Hindi-language web series

- Genre: Crime; Thriller; Action
- Created by: Neerraj Pathak
- Screenplay by: Neerraj Pathak; Sameer Arora
- Dialogues by: Neerraj Pathak; Sanjay Masoom
- Story by: Neerraj Pathak
- Directed by: Neerraj Pathak
- Starring: Randeep Hooda; Urvashi Rautela; Amit Sial; Abhimanyu Singh; Zakir Hussain; Akanksha Puri; Ayeesha Aiman; Bidita Bag; Rahul Mittra; Rajneesh Duggal; Ajay Chaudhary; Shalin Bhanot; Pravin Singh Sisodia
- Country of origin: India
- Original language: Hindi
- No. of seasons: 2
- No. of episodes: 18

Production
- Executive producers: Season 2: Priyanka Chauhdhary; Tejkarran Singh Bajaj; Deepak Sharma
- Producers: Neerraj Pathak; Krishan Choudhary; Jyoti Deshpande
- Cinematography: Chirantan Das
- Editor: Archit D Rastogi
- Production companies: Gold Mountain Pictures; Jio Studios; Spotless Films

Original release
- Network: JioCinema
- Release: 18 May 2023
- Network: JioHotstar
- Release: 15 May 2026

Inspector Avinash is an Indian Hindi-language action crime thriller web series written and directed by Neerraj Pathak. It stars Randeep Hooda, Urvashi Rautela, Amit Sial, Shalin Bhanot, Rahul Mittra, Zakir Hussain, Ayeesha S. Aiman, Zohaeb Farooqui, Bidita Bag, Pravin Sisodia, Rajneesh Duggal, Ajay Chaudhary and others.

== Plot ==
The series revolves around the life of UP cop Avinash Mishra. The Home Minister of the state orders to form a STF following a threat of contract killing of the Chief-Minister of the state by the dreaded gangster Prakash Shukla. Mishra heads the STF team and wages war against the gangsters.

== Cast ==
- Randeep Hooda as Inspector Avinash Mishra
- Urvashi Rautela as Poonam Mishra
- Rahul Mittra as M.L.A Jagjivan Yadav
- Amit Sial as Azimuddin Ghulam Sheikh
- Abhimanyu Singh as Devi
- Kiran Kumar as Chief Minister Agnihotri
- Zakir Hussain as DGP Samar Pratap Singh
- Ajay Chaudhary as Kabir
- Ayeesha Aiman as Nandini
- Akanksha Puri as Meetu Punjaban
- Adhyayan Suman as Home Minister's brother
- Bidita Bag as Amrita
- Samaira Sandhu as Journalist Zara Baig
- B Shantanu as Laxmikant
- Freddy Daruwala as Home Minister
- Irra Mor as Sub-Inspector Rani Paswan
- Shalin Bhanot as Inspector Baljit Singh
- Rajneesh Duggal as Ranvijay Ahlawat
- Zohaeb Farooqui as Imran Gazi
- Pravin Sisodia as Rathi
- Aeshra Patel as Dr. Suman

== Episodes ==
=== Series overview ===
Series	Episodes	Originally released	Network
1	8	18 May 2023	JioCinema
2	10	15 May 2026	JioHotstar

=== Season 1 ===
No.	Title	Directed by	Written by	Original release date
1	"The Dynamic Policeman, Avinash"	Neerraj Pathak	Neerraj Pathak, Sameer Arora; Dialogues: Neerraj Pathak, Sanjay Masoom	18 May 2023
2	"Avinash's Inspiring Quest"	Neerraj Pathak	Neerraj Pathak, Sameer Arora; Dialogues: Neerraj Pathak, Sanjay Masoom	18 May 2023
3	"Avinash Faces a Disaster"	Neerraj Pathak	Neerraj Pathak, Sameer Arora; Dialogues: Neerraj Pathak, Sanjay Masoom	18 May 2023
4	"Avinash Encounters Rafiq"	Neerraj Pathak	Neerraj Pathak, Sameer Arora; Dialogues: Neerraj Pathak, Sanjay Masoom	18 May 2023
5	"A Huge Responsibility for Avinash"	Neerraj Pathak	Neerraj Pathak, Sameer Arora; Dialogues: Neerraj Pathak, Sanjay Masoom	18 May 2023
6	"Avinash Gets Ambushed"	Neerraj Pathak	Neerraj Pathak, Sameer Arora; Dialogues: Neerraj Pathak, Sanjay Masoom	18 May 2023
7	"Avinash Receives a Tip"	Neerraj Pathak	Neerraj Pathak, Sameer Arora; Dialogues: Neerraj Pathak, Sanjay Masoom	18 May 2023
8	"Avinash Warns Devi"	Neerraj Pathak	Neerraj Pathak, Sameer Arora; Dialogues: Neerraj Pathak, Sanjay Masoom	18 May 2023

== Production ==
Filming of the series began on 15 January 2021.

== Release ==
The first season of Inspector Avinash premiered on JioCinema on 18 May 2023, while the second season is scheduled to premiere on JioHotstar on 15 May 2026.

== Reception ==
Abhishek Srivastava of The Times of India wrote "The initial episodes have only skimmed through these narratives, and it is hoped that the series will provide a well-defined rounded plot and proper background context to all the encounter stories." Abhishek Srivastava of Navbharat Times rated series 3.5 stars out of 5. Puneet Upadhyay of TV9 also rated series 3.5 stars out of 5.

Vinamra Mathur of Firstpost wrote "It’s all a swing between cliches and charisma. Hooda has always been a reliable and solid actor often trapped in underwhelming stories. Here too, we have a father-son conflict, expletives for effect, and a doting, sanskari wife." Vijayalakshmi Narayanan of The Free Press Journal rated the series 2.5 stars out of 5 and wrote "For those who are familiar with life and times in UP, the series is certainly designed for them. But, for much of the OTT-content consuming audience, that reside in the metros, there will be a sense of disconnect." The Tribune wrote "It would have been better if at least half the episodes of the series had been streamed to strike a chord. The big villains have not been revealed yet and small goons and players are making it an easy task for Avinash and his team."
