= Aeshra Patel =

Indian model and beauty pageant titleholder

- Born: Aeshra Patel; 10 April; Kavitha, Vadodara, India
- Occupations: Model, beauty pageant titleholder
- Years active: 2008–present
- Modeling information
- Height: 5 ft 9 in (1.75 m)

Aeshra Patel is an Indian beauty pageant titleholder and model. She participated in Femina Miss India 2010 and was a 1st runner up in the Ford Supermodel 2009 competition.

== Early life, education and personal life ==
Patel was born and brought up in village called Kavitha, Vadodara. Her parents are farmers. As she was born in a farmer family she grew up doing all the farming activities like working in the farm, milking cows, etc.

Aeshra won Miss Baroda competition while studying medicine. Then she decided to pursue her dreams and moved to Mumbai to establish her career in modelling. Aeshra wasn't well versed with English language before she moved to Mumbai. She learnt the language all by herself.

Patel became an actor and obtained roles in Barot House and Inspector Avinash. She suffered a car accident and was more than 6 months in recovery.

== Career ==
=== Early career and Femina Miss India 2010 ===
Aeshra moved to Mumbai in 2008. She did number of television commercials & fashion shows. Some of her early notable work include commercials for Pantene, and Pizza Hut. Aeshra participated in Ford Supermodel 2009 competition and became the 1st runner up. Aeshra also participated in Femina Miss India in 2010.

=== Lakme Fashion Week and India's International Jewellery Fashion Week ===
Aeshra has walked the ramp at Lakme Fashion Week in 2011-2012 for notable fashion designers like Tarun Tahiliani, Sabyasachi Mukherji, Rohit Bal, Neeta Lulla, Anita Dongre, Shyamal and Bhoomika, Babita Malkani, and many more. Aeshra has also walked the ramp at India's International Jewellery Fashion Week in 2012–2013.

=== Kingfisher Calendar Girl 2013 ===
In 2013, Aeshra participated in Kingfisher Calendar Girl. She was awarded to be the new face of TRESemmé during the competition.

=== Other modelling and print work ===
Aeshra's other notable TV commercial work includes commercials for Puma, Emami Fair & Handsome, Provogue, Axe Deo, Spice Mobile, Star Cricket Promo, MTV Promo, Radical Rice, Reliance Mobile, Skoda, Intel, UTV Stars, and Breast Cancer Awareness Campaign which featured voiceover from Amitabh Bachchan.

Aeshra has also done a music video titled "Always on My Mind" with notable Pakistani pop icon Zohaib Hassan.

Aeshra's print work includes ads for Provogue, Raymond Suitings, Nature Valley Health Bars, Garden Vareli, Water Kingdom, Big Bazar, TBZ Jewellers, Economic Times, Kalanjali Sarees, Panache Jewellery, Skoda Calendar, Jai Hind Suitings, and Novotel Hotels.

=== Acting ===
Patel obtained roles in Barot House and Inspector Avinash.

External videos
- Pantene Commercial, YouTube video
- Kingfisher Calendar Girl 2013, YouTube video
- Provogue TV commercial, YouTube video
- Emami Fair and Handsome latest commercial, YouTube video
- Ramp Ready Hairstyles by TRESemmé - Twisted Side Bun, YouTube video
- Ramp Ready Hairstyles by TRESemmé - Messy Updo, YouTube video
- Always on My Mind by Zoheb Hassan, YouTube video
- Breast Cancer Awareness Campaign, YouTube video
- PUMA Deccan Chargers - Horny for Cricket, YouTube video
- UTV Stars commercial, YouTube video

== Filmography ==
Year	Film	Role	Language	Notes
2019	Barot House	Hina Desai	Hindi	
2023	Inspector Avinash	Dr. Suman	Hindi	
