= I M 24 =

I AM 24
- Directed by: Saurabh Shukla
- Produced by: Arindam Chowdhuri
- Starring: Rajat Kapoor; Ranvir Shorey; Neha Dhupia
- Cinematography: Fuwad Khan
- Edited by: Arif Sheikh
- Music by: Jatin Pandit
- Production company: Planman Motion Pictures
- Distributed by: Mirchi Movies
- Release date: 31 August 2012
- Country: India
- Language: Hindi

I AM 24 is a 2012 Indian Hindi-language comedy film directed by Saurabh Shukla starring Rajat Kapoor, Ranvir Shorey, Manjari Fadnis and Neha Dhupia. The film was released on 31 August 2012.

== Plot ==
The plot revolves around a 40-year-old Subhendu Roy who falls in love with a much younger lady named Kanak. To attract her, he pretends to be a 24-year-old man who works as a writer for a prominent Bollywood director in an online chat. Subhendu Roy resides with his roommate Gagan, who is a struggling actor.

== Cast ==
- Rajat Kapoor as Subhendu Roy
- Ranvir Shorey as Gagan
- Neha Dhupia as Sheela
- Manjari Fadnis as Kanak
- Saurabh Shukla as Bollywood Director Sidhwani
- Delnaaz Irani as Delnaaz Paul
- Lillete Dubey as Don's wife
- Karan Singh Grover

== Soundtrack ==
No.	Title	Singer(s)	Length
1.	"Sab Chalta Hai"	Gaurav Bangia
2.	"Chota Sa Sapna Hai Yeh"	Shreya Ghoshal
3.	"Yeh Kaya Hua"	Shaan
4.	"Tan Mein Jalan"	Sunidhi Chauhan
5.	"Dil Yeh Pagal Maane"	Sukhwinder Singh
6.	"Yeh Kaya Hua" (Remix)	Shaan
