= Manjari Fadnis =

Indian actress (born 1988)

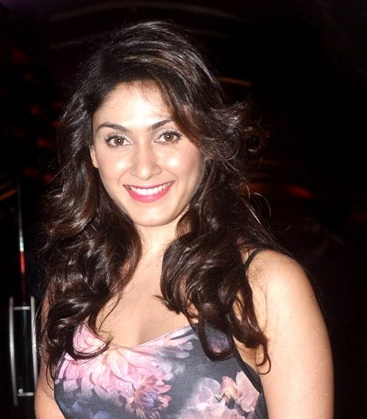
- Fadnis in 2015
- Born: 10 July 1988 (age 38); Mumbai, Maharashtra, India
- Other names: Manjari; Manjari Phadnis
- Occupations: Actress, model, singer
- Years active: 2003–present

Manjari Fadnis (also spelt Phadnis and Fadnnis, born on 10 July 1988), also credited professionally as Manjari, is an Indian actress, model, and singer. She is known for her work primarily in Hindi and Telugu films. In addition, she has also acted in Bengali, Tamil, Kannada, and Malayalam films. She gained widespread recognition for her role in the 2008 Hindi film Jaane Tu... Ya Jaane Na. Her other notable works include Faltu (2006), Zokkomon (2011), Warning (2013), Grand Masti (2013), Kis Kisko Pyaar Karoon (2015), the short film Khamakha (2016), and Barot House (2019).

== Career ==
Manjari first appeared on television during the second season of the Indian version of the singing reality show Popstars, which was aired on Channel V India in 2003. She was one of the participants who made it to the finals for the musical band Aasma.

She began her film career with Rok Sako To Rok Lo in 2004. She later appeared in Jaane Tu... Ya Jaane Na (2008) where she portrayed the protagonist's (played by Imran Khan) girlfriend. Jaane Tu... Ya Jaane Na was successful and enjoyed critical acclaim. Earlier, she was part of the National Film Award-winning Bengali feature film Faltu (2006) and also Mumbai Salsa (2007). In 2008, she made a debut in Telugu films with Siddu From Sikakulam, followed by her first Tamil film Muthirai (2009). For Muthirai, she sung a Tamil song under the direction of Yuvan Shankar Raja. In September 2009, she was signed to appear in a series of Onida Television commercials.

In 2010, Manjari was featured in the Telugu films Inkosaari and Shubhapradham. She then starred in the Walt Disney-produced superhero film Zokkomon, starring Darsheel Safary. The film received positive reviews from critics. She also worked in the Telugu film Shakti (2011) alongside Jr. NTR, and in 2012 in a Hindi film I M 24, and her debut Kannada film Munjane. The year 2013 saw the release of her films Warning and Grand Masti (opposite Aftab Shivdasani). Grand Masti was the highest-grossing Bollywood film with an A (Adults Only) certificate in India. Her next film was the Mohanlal headlined Mr. Fraud (2014), which marked her Malayalam debut. In 2015 she starred alongside Kapil Sharma in the romantic comedy film Kis Kisko Pyaar Karoon. She then acted alongside Shreyas Talpade in the content driven film Wah Taj (2016). Wah Taj featured a dance song "Chori Chichori" for which she dressed in traditional Marathi Mulgi attire and did a semi-folk popular dance. She also was featured in her maiden Marathi film Sarv Mangal Savdhan (2016) opposite Raqesh Vashisth. She appeared as a lead actress in the, film Jeena Isi Ka Naam Hai (2017), starring Arbaaz Khan, Himansh Kohli and Ashutosh Rana. In 2018, she performed in the mystery film Nirdosh opposite Ashmit Patel and an action comedy film Baa Baaa Black Sheep opposite Manish Paul.

In 2017, her short film Khamakha (2016) won the Filmfare for Best Short Film People's Choice Award. Her other short films are The Morning After (2013), The Cot (2017), Jackie Shroff vehicle The Playboy Mr Sawhney (2018) and Interdependence: Megha's divorce (2019).

In 2019, she appeared in both the thriller web-film Barot House, which aired on ZEE5 and also the web series Fuh Se Fantasy:The Blindfold on Voot.

She received the Movers and Shakers award at the MAAC 24FPS International Animation Awards 2015. In 2020, she received the Youth Icon Award for 'Excellency in Entertainment Industry' at Maier Medi International Short Film Festival.

She made her first theatrical performance in Double Deal Reloaded (English), in Mumbai in 2017 and the following year in Kolkata, Bengaluru and Hyderabad. In 2018, she performed in the musical drama Devdas in Mumbai.

She has undergone dance training under Shiamak Davar and vocal training under Sucheta Bhattacharjee.

=== Music ===
Manjari sang the song 'Azhagana Neeyum' under the direction of Yuvan Shankar Raja for the Tamil film Muthirai (2009). She also sang the songs Sonya Ve Sajna in the Indo-Pakistani music album Beat Beyond Borders composed by Pakistani musician Fakhar-e-Alam in 2012 and Ga Raha Hai Ye Aasma composed by Raghav Sachar in 2014. In 2015, she sang in a duet Marathi song composed by Nikhil Kamat for the film Sarv Mangal Savdhan. She recorded her first solo song Alvida composed by Arif-Troy in 2017.

=== Modelling ===
Manjari was featured on the cover of the Woman's Era Magazine September 2015 issue. She has also appeared as a model in various fashion events such as Bombay Times Fashion Week 2018, Intimate Fashion Week 2017, and Dubai Fashion League 2017. She appeared in a Hyundai i10 TV advertisement with Shah Rukh Khan in May 2012. She has also appeared in a series of Onida Television commercials in 2009, an iball TV ad in 2011, and a Mehfil Southall Hotel/Restaurant/Banquet TV ad in 2015. She has also been featured in the music videos Beat Beyond Borders (2011) and Raghav Sachar feat (2014).

== Early life ==
Manjari is from a Marathi family and was born at Sagar, Madhya Pradesh to Ruchi Fadnis and Col Bharat Kumar Fadnis. She has a sibling Gagan Fadnis. As her father served in the Indian Army, she grew up in Shimla, Jammu, Delhi, Mumbai and Pune.

== Filmography ==
=== Feature films ===
Year	Film	Role	Language	Notes
2004	Rok Sako To Rok Lo	Suhana Sharma	Hindi	Debut film, credited as Manjari
2006	Faltu	Tuktuki	Bengali	
2007	Mumbai Salsa	Maya Chandhok	Hindi	credited as Manjari
2008	Jaane Tu... Ya Jaane Na	Meghna Pariyar	Hindi	credited as Manjari
2008	Siddu From Sikakulam	Sailaja Reddy	Telugu	credited as Manjari
2009	Muthirai	Aarthi	Tamil	
2010	Inkosaari	Shruthi	Telugu	credited as Manjari
2010	Shubhapradham	Indu	Telugu	
2011	Shakti	Gauri	Telugu	
2011	Zokkomon	Kittu Chopra	Hindi	
2012	Munjane	Pavithra	Kannada	
2012	I M 24	Kanak	Hindi	
2013	Grand Masti	Tulsi Chawla	Hindi	
2013	Warning	Sabina Sanyal	Hindi	
2014	Mr. Fraud	Priya	Malayalam	
2015	Kis Kisko Pyaar Karoon	Juhi Kishan Punj	Hindi	
2016	Wah Taj	Rhea / Sunanda	Hindi	
2016	Sarv Mangal Savdhan	Vrushali	Marathi	
2017	Jeena Isi Ka Naam Hai	Alia Patrick	Hindi	
2018	Nirdosh	Shanaya Grover	Hindi	
2018	Baa Baaa Black Sheep	Angelina Morris	Hindi	
2019	Barot House	Bhavana Barot	Hindi	Released on Zee5
2021	State of Siege: Temple Attack	Saloni	Hindi	Released on Zee5
2022	Adrushya	Protagonist	Marathi	
2024	Chalti Rahe Zindagi	Naina	Hindi	Released on Zee5
2025	Pune Highway	Natasha	Hindi	

=== Short films ===
Year	Film	Role	Language
2013	The Morning After	Sumi	English
2016	Khamakha	Raina	Hindi
2017	The Cot	Sarla	Hindi
2018	The Playboy Mr. Sawhney	Mary	Hindi
2019	Interdependence : Megha's divorce	Megha	Hindi

=== Web series ===
Year	Web-series	Role	Language	Platform
2019	Fuh Se Fantasy: The Blindfold	Neha	Hindi	Voot
2022	Masoom	Sanjana	Hindi	Disney+ Hotstar
2022	Miya Biwi Aur Murder	Mrs. Priya Roy	Hindi	MX Player
2023	The Freelancer	Mrunal Kamath	Hindi	Disney+ Hotstar

=== Television ===
Year	Reality Show	Channel	Notes
2003	Popstars India Season 2	Channel [V]	Finished as one of the top 8 contestants
2019	Kitchen Champion	Colors TV	Guest Appearance

== Discography ==
Year	Album	Song	Composer
2009	Muthirai	"Azhagana Neeyum"	Yuvan Shankar Raja
2012	Beat Beyond Borders	"Sonya Ve Sajna"	Fakhar-e-Alam
2014	Raghav Sachar feat	"Ga Raha Hai Ye Aasmaa"	Raghav Sachar

== Theatre ==
Year	Play	Role	Language	Place
2017	Double Deal Reloaded	Rhea	English	Mumbai
2018	Double Deal Reloaded	Rhea	English	Kolkata
2018	Double Deal Reloaded	Rhea	English	Bengaluru
2018	Double Deal Reloaded	Rhea	English	Hyderabad
2018	Devdas	Chandramukhi	Hindi	Mumbai

== Awards and nominations ==
Year	Award	Category	Film	Results
2005	Zee Cine Awards	Best Female Debut	Rok Sako To Rok Lo	Nominated
2013	2nd SIIMA Awards	Best Female Debutant	Munjane	Nominated
2020	Youth Icon Awards at MMISFF	Excellency in Entertainment industry		Nominated

== Charity and social causes ==
Manjari participated in the fashion show 'Umeed-Ek Koshish-A Starwalk for Charity' in 2012 and Amy Billimoria's 'The Walk of Pride' Charity show in 2015. Earlier in 2012, she attended the Global Peace Fashion Show to commemorate the victims of 26/11 Mumbai terror attacks. She volunteered for the Punjab Kesari 'Selfie with Daughter' campaign to address the importance of saving a girl child in 2016. In 2018, she wrote an open letter to the Prime Minister expressing her concern about the safety of women in India. In the same year, she campaigned to emphasise celebrating Ganesh Chaturthi with eco-friendly Ganesha idols. In 2019, she participated in an event held in Mumbai concerning digital detoxification.
