= Champaran Satyagraha =

First civil resistance movement led by Mohandas Karamchand Gandhi in India in 1917

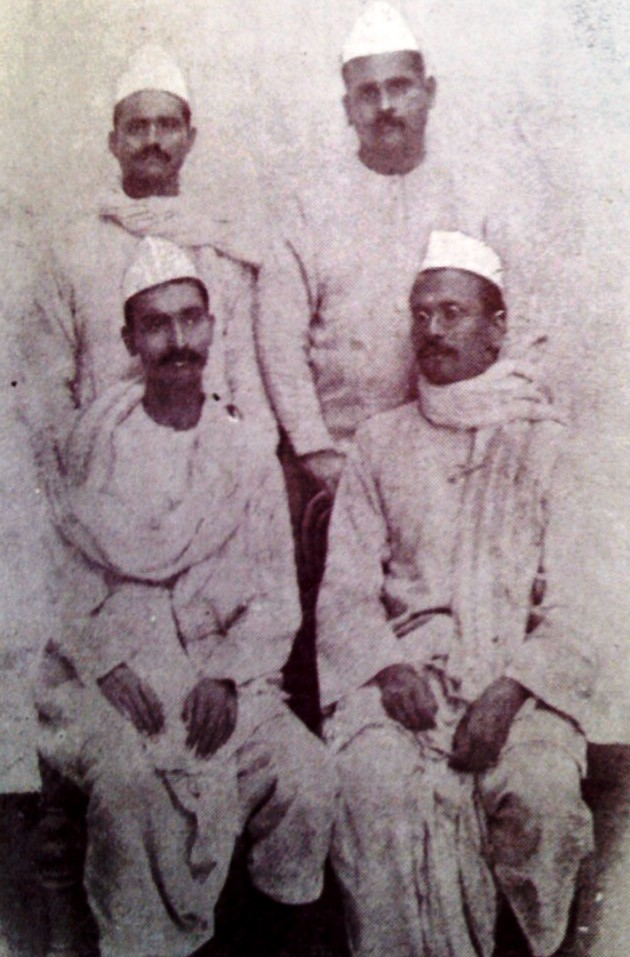
- (Sitting left to right) Rajendra Prasad and Anugrah Narayan Sinha with (standing left to right) local vakils (lawyers) Ramnavmi Prasad and Shambhu Sharan Verma during Mahatma Gandhi's 1917 Champaran movement
- Date: 10 April ― May 1917
- Location: Champaran district of Bihar
- Organised by: Mahatma Gandhi, Brajkishore Prasad, Rajendra Prasad, Anugrah Narayan Sinha Ramnavmi Prasad, Mazhar-ul-Haq and others including J. B. Kripalani & Babu Gaya Prasad Singh.

The Champaran Satyagraha of 1917 was the first satyagraha movement led by Mahatma Gandhi in British India and is considered a historically important rebellion in the Indian independence movement. It was a farmer's uprising that took place in Champaran district of Bihar in the Indian subcontinent, during the British colonial period. The farmers were protesting against having to grow indigo with barely any payment for it.

When Gandhi returned to India from South Africa in 1915 and saw peasants in Northern India oppressed by indigo planters, he tried to use what he had used in South Africa to organize mass uprisings by people to protest against injustice.

Champaran Satyagraha was the first popular satyagraha movement. The Champaran Satyagraha gave direction to India's youth and freedom struggle, which was tottering between moderates who prescribed Indian participation within the British colonial system, and the radicals from Bengal who advocated the use of violent methods to topple British colonial rule in India.

Under colonial-era laws, many tenant farmers were forced to grow some indigo on a portion of their land as a condition of their tenancy, under Panchkathia or Teenkathia system. This indigo was used to make dye. The Germans had invented artificial dye so the demand for indigo fell. Some tenants paid more rent in return for being let off from growing indigo. However, during the First World War the German dye ceased to be available and so indigo became profitable again. Thus many tenants were once again forced to grow it on a portion of their land- as was required by their lease. Naturally, this created much anger and resentment.

Prompted by the invitation of local peasant Raj Kumar Shukla to investigate the grievances of farmers, Mahatma Gandhi undertook his initial political endeavor in India, the Champaran Satyagraha. Joined by prominent figures including Rajendra Prasad, Mazhar ul-Haq, Mahadeo Desai, Narhari Parekh and J.B. Kripalani, Gandhi journeyed to Champaran to examine the oppressive conditions. Brajkishore Prasad, Anugraha Narayan Sinha, Ramnavmi Prasad, Shambhusharan Varma also participated. When authorities instructed Gandhi to depart, he defied the order and preferred to face punishment. Gandhi's refusal marked his first act of passive resistance or civil disobedience on Indian soil. This pivotal action, coupled with his subsequent efforts leading to the establishment of a Government Commission of Inquiry on which he served, resulted in a negotiated settlement. This agreement compelled the planters to reimburse the peasants 25% of unlawfully collected funds and, significantly, led to the dismantling of the exploitative 'Teenkathia' system. Within a decade, the planters left the area.

== Centenary celebrations ==
The series of celebration began on 10 April 2017 with a National Conclave (Rashtritya Vimarsh) where eminent Gandhian thinkers, philosophers, and scholars participated. The event was organised by Education Department and Directorate of Mass Education being the nodal office. On 13 May 2017, Indian Postal Department Issued three commemorative postage stamps and a miniature sheet on Champaran Satyagraha Centenary.

Prime Minister Narendra Modi on 10 April 2017 attended the concluding ceremony of the Champaran Satyagraha's centenary celebrations at Motihari in Champaran district of Bihar. PM Modi's key initiatives, including Swachh Bharat Mission attempt to reinterpret the theme of Champaran Satyagraha as Swachhagraha, thus to "re-emphasise the spirit of cleanliness – or Swachhta – which was close to Mahatma Gandhi's heart.

== See also ==
- Indigo revolt
- Kheda Satyagraha of 1918
- Non-co-operation movement
- Indian Independence Movement, Indian Nationalism
- My Autobiography or The Story Of My Experiments With Truth (1929) by M.K. Gandhi
- Mohandas Gandhi
- Gandhism
- Satyagraha
- Sardar Vallabhbhai Patel
- West Champaran district
- East Champaran district
