= Champaran =

- Region
- Location in Bihar, India Champaran (Bihar)
- Coordinates (Mehsi): 26°21′20″N 85°6′58″E
- Country: India
- State: Bihar
- Time zone: UTC+5:30 (IST)
- Postal code: 845401

Champaran is a historical region of the Mithila region in the state of Bihar in India. During the period of King Janaka in the Ramayana, it was a part of the Mithila Kingdom. Similarly during the Karnat Dynasty in Mithila, it was the part of the Tirhut kingdom. It is now divided into two districts: East Champaran and West Champaran and are the parts of the Tirhut Division.

== History ==
Champaran is identified with the Champāraṇya mentioned in the Bheraghat inscription as a place claimed to be "devastated" by the Kalachuri king Yashaḥkarṇa (11th/12th century). And people of every community have been worshipping Mehsi Mazar since (Mirja Halim Shah Dargah) 1200 AD, which had shown the people here the right way to live life. In 1917, Mahatma Gandhi led a satyagraha movement in the Champaran district against the policies enforced by European landowners and the colonial government. These policies coerced local farmers into cultivating indigo at unfairly low prices. In response to Gandhi's leadership, the British authorities initially arrested him but later released him, subsequently amending the laws to alleviate the plight of the peasants. This marked Gandhi's first campaign in India and a significant triumph for the principles of civil disobedience.

== People ==
- Batak Mian - A cook who saved the life of Mahatma Gandhi
- Manoj Bajpai –
- Dinesh Bhramar – poet and noted figure in Hindi and Bhojpuri literature
- Anuranjan Jha – Indian journalist
- Prakash Jha – Indian filmmaker
- Ramesh Chandra Jha – Indian poet, novelist and freedom fighter
- Abdullah Khan – novelist and screenwriter
- Ravish Kumar – Indian journalist
- Gopal Singh Nepali – Indian poet of Hindi literature, Bollywood lyricist
- George Orwell – English novelist, essayist, journalist and critic
- Kedar Pandey – Congress leader and ex-Chief Minister of Bihar
- Afroz Alam Sahil – Indian journalist
- Raj Kumar Shukla – indigo cultivator, activist
- Radha Mohan Singh – Indian politician
- Sanjeev K Jha – Indian script writer, filmmaker

== The Literary History of Champaran ==
Author Ramesh Chandra Jha documented the literary history of Champaran. His research-based books including Champaran Ki Sahitya Sadhana (1958), Champaran: Literature & Literary Writers (1967), and Apne Aur Sapne: A Literary Journey Of Champaran (1988) record the literary history of Champaran, Bihar. These books serve as reference points for researchers, scholars, Ph.D. students, and journalists. Jha's work focused on the historical and literary history of Champaran.
