= Barot House =

2019 Indian film

- Film poster
- Directed by: Bugs Bhargava Krishna
- Written by: Sanjeev K Jha
- Produced by: Jahanara Bhargava; Seema Mohapatra; Hussain Shaikh
- Starring: Amit Sadh; Manjari Fadnis
- Cinematography: Deep Metkar
- Edited by: Akshara Prabhakar
- Production companies: Faizee Productions; Ten Years Younger Productions
- Distributed by: ZEE5
- Release date: 7 August 2019
- Running time: 89 minutes
- Country: India
- Language: Hindi

Barot House is a 2019 Indian Hindi-language psychological thriller film directed by Bugs Bhargava Krishna and written by Sanjeev K. Jha. It stars Amit Sadh and Manjari Fadnis in the lead roles. The story revolves around an upper middle-class Indian family caught in the whirlwind of murder and crime. The film was released through Zee5 on 7 August 2019 to generally positive response from the critics.

== Plot ==
Amit Barot, the patriarch of the Barot House, lives in a serene neighbourhood in Daman with his family consisting of his wife, Bhavana, mother, and 4 children – a son and 3 daughters.

On Janmashtami, one of the daughters, Shreya, goes missing while playing hide and seek. The following day, her body is found in a graveyard. Amit's younger brother Ajay and their neighbour Anthony are suspected for the murder of Shreya. Soon after, the second daughter of the house, Shruti, also dies, and the police suspect Ajay.

Both Amit and Bhavana become emotionally drained and Amit starts suspecting his son Malhar for the deaths of his daughters after he apparently tried to drown his baby sister Sneha while playing, who was saved by Amit. Malhar even admits it when Amit violently questions him.

One day Anthony's son Roshan is murdered and Amit tries to hang Malhar to save everyone but he can't. The police question Amit about Roshan's murder and Amit says that Malhar is the murderer. Malhar also accepts it.

Malhar then admits himself to the juvenile home. A psychologist questions him to find the fact and fails. He is reluctant to see his father too. They find scars on the boy's back, and when he asks to draw something, he draws pictures of his father murdering the girls with him watching from a distance. But he throws away those drawings and shows one in which he plays tabla. The psychologist finds the drawings in the dustbin after watching Malhar through CCTV and believes that his father is the killer and Malhar tried to save his father because he worships him.

The police question the family again and it is revealed that Amit as well as Anthony's wife Sophia suspect Bhavana and Anthony of having an affair and Amit always suspected Shreya and Shruti to be Anthony's daughters. The police arrest Amit and release Malhar. Amit tries to attack the boy, and because of this the police thinks he carried out the killings. Bhavana also does not believe Amit.

After a few days, while Bhavana is upstairs, Malhar throws little Sneha into the well which Bhavana witnesses from upstairs and screams. In the epilogue, Amit is released from jail and Malhar arrested again. Amit and Bhavana adopt 3 daughters and name them Shreya, Shruti and Sneha. They move out of Barot house and never see Malhar again. It is assumed that Malhar has schizophrenia, and he is very cunning for his age to lead the psychologists to believe in his innocence, without uttering a word. He even knew that he was being watched through CCTV. Malhar never explains the reason behind the murders of his sisters.

== Cast ==
- Amit Sadh as Amit Barot
- Manjari Fadnis as Bhavana Barot
- Aaryan Menghji as Malhar Barot
- Aseem Hattangadi as Anthony D'Souza
- Farida Patel Venkat as Pramila Patel
- Kiearra Soni as Shreya Barot
- Kishaa Arora as Shruti Barot
- Alefia Kapadia as Sophia D'Souza
- Aeshra Patel as Hina Desai
