= Shagun TV =

Shagun TV(शगुन)
- Country: India
- Broadcast area: India, Fiji, Suriname, Marithus, Guyna
- Network: Vertent Media
- Headquarters: New Delhi, India

Programming
- Language: Hindi
- Picture format: 576i (HDTV)

Ownership
- Owner: Vertent Media Soft. Pvt. LTd.

History
- Launched: 26 April 2013

Links
- Website: www.shagunindia.com

Shagun is a Hindi-language 24/7 Wedding Entertainment television channel, owned by Vertent Media Soft. Pvt. Ltd.

== Rebranding ==
In May 2019, Shagun TV underwent a rebranding process and transformed into a news channel known as R9 TV ( a Free to Air channel (FTA)), specifically focusing on Hindi news coverage.
