= State Highway 74 (Bihar) =

Road in Bihar, India

State Highway 74

Route information
- Maintained by Bihar State Road Development Corporation (BSRDC)
- Length: 127.20 km (79.04 mi)

Major junctions
- East end: Hajipur (Vaishali district)
- West end: Areraj (East Champaran district)

Location
- Country: India
- State: Bihar

Highway system
- Roads in India; Expressways; National; State; Asian; State Highways in Bihar

State Highway 74 (SH-74) is a state highway in Bihar State. It covers three major districts (Vaishali district, Muzaffarpur district and East Champaran district) of Bihar state. This state highway starts from Hajipur. In Hajipur this road is also known as Hajipur Lalganj road.

== Route ==
The route of SH-74 from east to west is as follows:

- Hajipur
- Gadai Sarai
- Ishmailpur
- Lalganj
- Vaishali (ancient city)
- Sadipur (Muzaffarpur)
- Paroo (Muzaffarpur)
- Sahebganj
- Kesaria
- Rampur Khajuria (East Champaran)
- Sangrampur (East Champaran)
- Areraj

Note: SH-74 ends at Areraj. After that state highway (SH-54) move east towards Motihari and move west towards Bettiah.
