= 1971 Indian general election in Bihar =

The 1971 Indian general election in Bihar were held to elect the 53 members from Bihar to constitute the 5th Lok Sabha. Over 15 million people voted in the state of Bihar in the 1971 Indian general election, a turnout of 49%. The Indian National Congress won 39 seats from a total of 53.

== National parties ==
- BJS Bharatiya Jana Sangh
- CPI Communist Party of India
- CPM Communist Party of India (Marxist)
- INC Indian National Congress
- NCO Indian National Congress (Organisation)
- PSP Praja Socialist Party
- SSP Samyukta Socialist Party
- SWA Swatantra Party

== Statistics ==
=== Size of electorate: Bihar ===
Men	Women	Total
1,62,71,582	1,47,48,369	3,10,19,951

Voter turnout	Poll Percentage	No. of polling stations
1,51,86,628	48.96%	36,487

== List of elected MPs ==
#	Constituency	Elected MP	Party
1	Bagaha (SC)	Bhola Raut	INC
2	Motihari	Bibhuti Mishra	INC
3	Bettiah	Kamal Nath Tiwari	INC
4	Gopalganj	Dwarika Nath Tiwary	INC
5	Siwan	Mohamad Yusuf	INC
6	Chapra	Ram Shekhar Prasad Singh	INC
7	Maharajganj	Ramdeo Singh	SSP
8	Kesaria	Kamla Mishra Madhukar	CPI
9	Hajipur	Digvijay Narain Singh	INC(O)
10	Muzaffarpur	Nawal Kishore Sinha	INC
11	Sitamarhi	Nagendra Prasad Yadav	INC
12	Pupri	Hari Kishore Singh	INC
13	Jainagar	Bhogendra Jha	CPI
14	Madhubani	Jagannath Mishra	INC
15	Samastipur	Yamuna Prasad Mandal	INC
16	Darbhanga	Vinoda Nand Jha	INC
17	Rosera (SC)	Ram Bhagat Paswan	INC
18	Saharsa	Chiranjib Jha	INC
19	Madhipura	Rajendra Prasad Yadav	INC
20	Araria (SC)	Tul Mohan Ram	INC
21	Kishanganj	Jamilur Rahman	INC
22	Purnea	Mohammad Tahir	INC
23	Katihar	Gyaneshwar Prasad Yadav	ABJS
24	Rajmahal (ST)	Iswar Marandi	INC
25	Bodda	Jagdish N. Mandal	INC
26	Dumka (ST)	Satya Charan Besra	INC
27	Banka	Shiv Chandika Prasad	INC
28	Bhagalpur	Bhagwat Jha Azad	INC
29	Monghyr	Deonandan Prasad Yadav	INC
30	Jamui (SC)	Bhola Manjhi	CPI
31	Khagaria	Shivshankar Prasad Yadav	SSP
32	Begusarai	Shyamnandan Mishra	INC(O)
33	Nalanda	Sedheshwar Prasad	INC
34	Barh	Dharamvir Singh	INC
35	Patna	Ramavatar Shastri	CPI
36	Shahabad	Bali Ram Bhagat	INC
37	Buxar	Anant Prasad Sharma	INC
38	Bikramganj	Sheo Pujan Singh	INC
39	Sasaram (SC)	Jag Jiwan Ram	INC
40	Aurangabad	Satyendra Narayan Sinha	INC(O)
41	Jehanabad	Chandra Shekhar Sinha	CPI
42	Nawada	Sukhdeo Prasad Verma	INC
43	Gaya (SC)	Ishwar Choudhary	ABJS
44	Chatra	Shankar Dyal Singh	INC
45	Giridih	Chapalendu Bhattacharyya	INC
46	Dhanbad	Ram Narain Sharma	INC
47	Hazaribagh	Damodar Pandey	INC
48	Ranchi	Prashant Kumar Ghosh	INC
49	Jamshedpur	Sardar Swaran Singh Sokhi	INC
50	Singhbhum (ST)	Moran Singh Purty	All India Jharkhand Party
51	Khunti (ST)	Nirel Enem Horo	Independent
52	Lohardaga (ST)	Kartik Oraon	INC
53	Palamau (SC)	Kamla Kumari	INC
