= Hussaini, Bihar =

Hussaini
- Village
- Location in Bihar, India Hussaini (India)
- Coordinates: 26.376847°N 84.795161°E
- Country: India
- State: Bihar
- Division: Tirhut
- District: East Champaran
- Subdivision: Chakia
- Block: Kesaria

Languages
  - Spoken: Hindi, Urdu, Bhojpuri
- Time zone: UTC+5:30 (IST)
- PIN: 845423
- Telephone code: 06257
- ISO 3166 code: IN-BR
- Nearest city: Kesariya
- Lok Sabha: Motihari Constituency
- Vidhan Sabha: Kesariya Constituency

Hussaini is a Village near Kesariya in Kesariya Assembly Constituency of East Champaran District, Bihar state, India.

== Location and overview ==
Hussaini lies on the Bihar State highway, SH-74 - the only road that links Kesaria Stupa with Motihari fairly. The village has a nearby Railway Station Chakia. It is 7 km far from nearest city Kesariya and Kesariya Stupa. The associate post office is in its own area known as Hussaini Sub Post Office with the PIN code 845423.

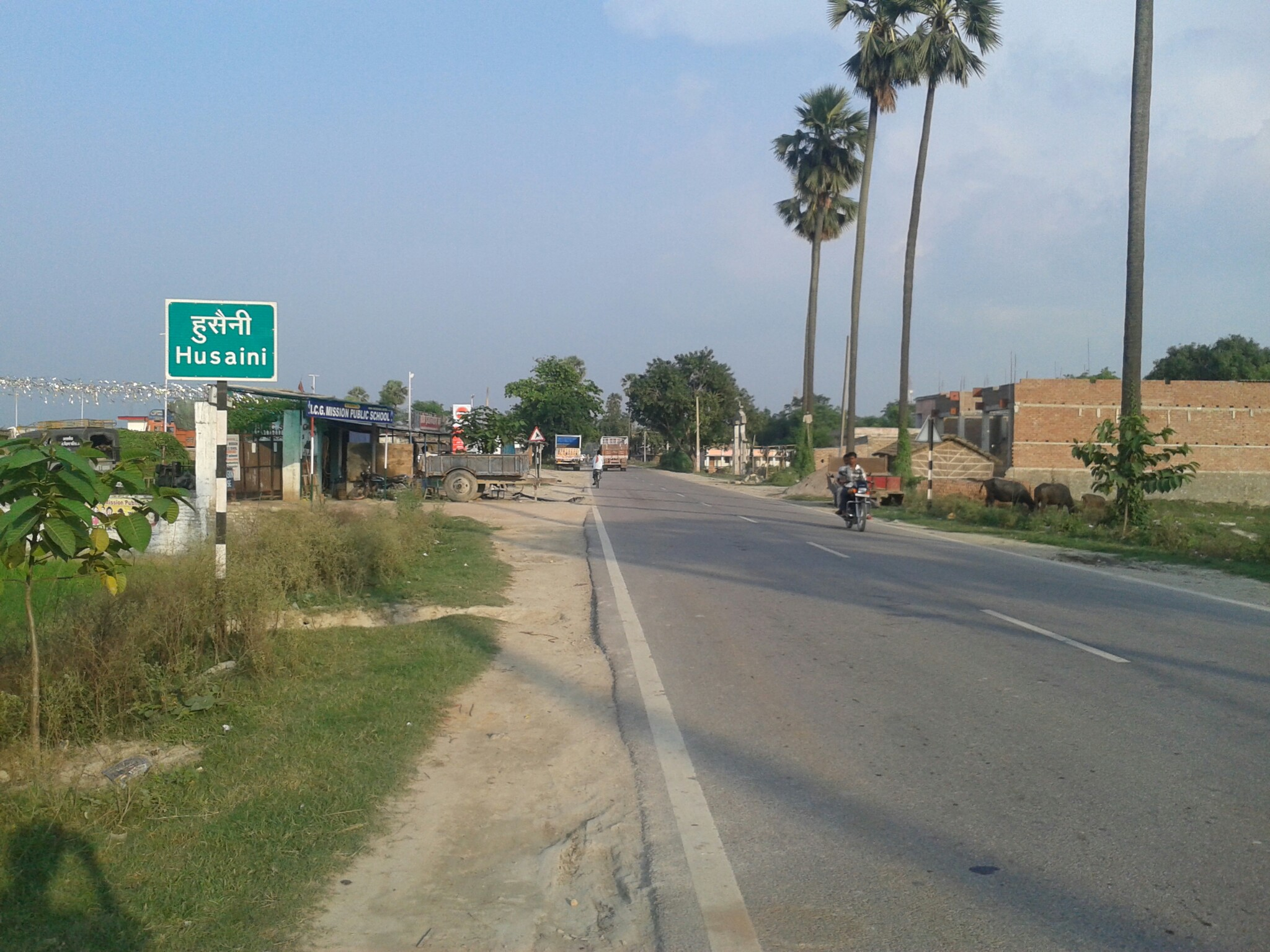
Hussaini Road SH-74.

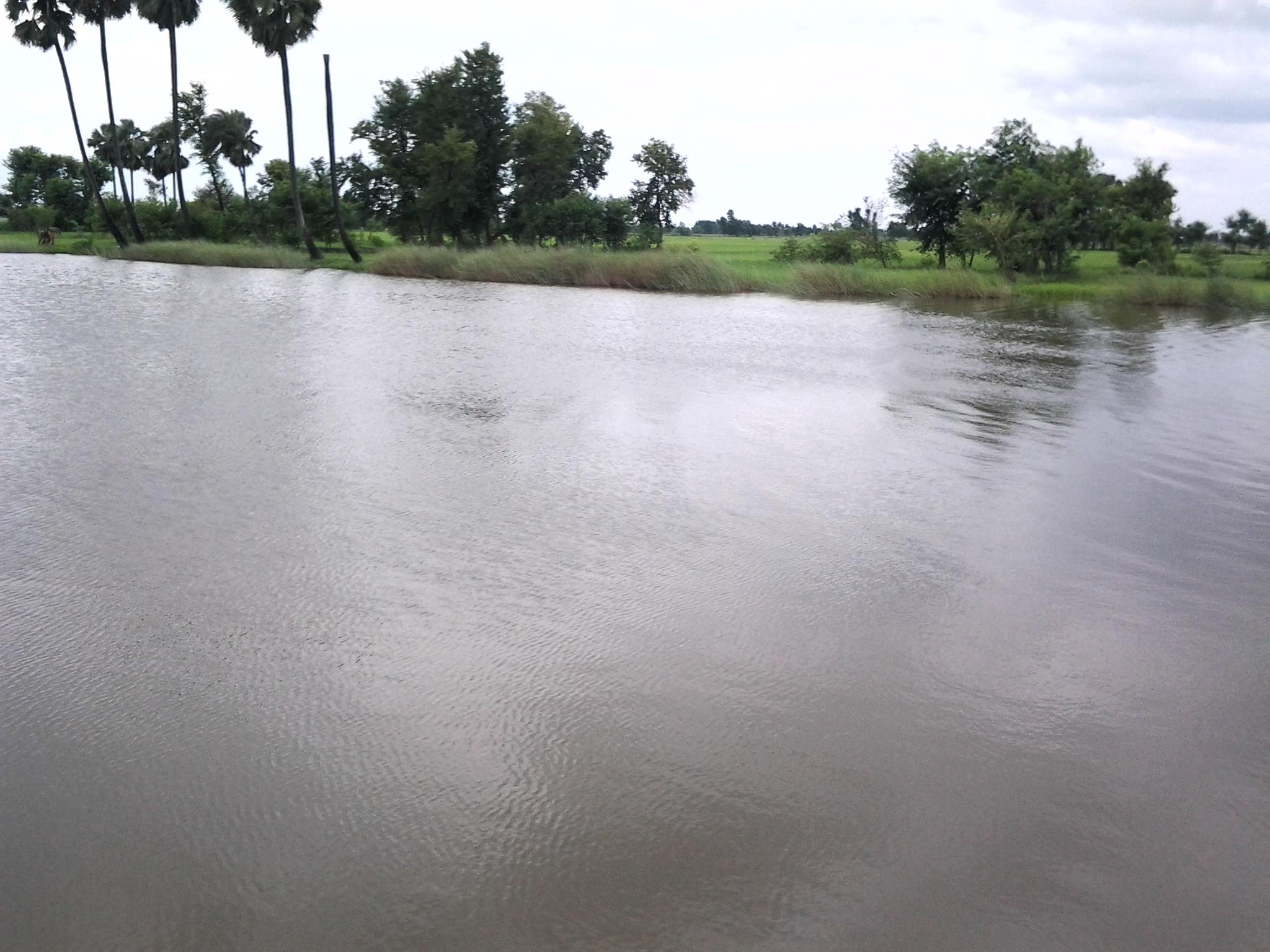
Hussaini lake.

== Languages ==
Languages include Hindi, Urdu and Bhojpuri, a tongue in the Bihari Language group with almost 40 000 000 speakers, written in both the Devanagari and Kaithi scripts.

== Education ==
This village has an Inter-Level Government High School for free education for boys and girls. The village also has Middle and Lower level Government schools for small children. DP High School is the Inter-Level School situated in middle of the village. Students from nearby villages also come here to study.

== Agriculture ==
The soil is good, and very fertile. The old farmers looked well after it, ploughing in manure on a regular basis, and allowing fields to lie fallow as part of a good system of crop rotation. However, the intense advertising efforts of the agrochemicals industry have resulted in a current unhealthy reliance on nitrogen fertilisers.

The farming year starts around February, whenever the ground dries out enough after the winter rains to allow ploughing to begin. Much of the ploughing is still done with Oxen.

== Festival ==
The most common festival celebrated here include Eid-ul-Fitra, Holi, Eid-ul-Azha, Diwali, Shab-e-baraat, Rakshabandhan, Muharram, Chhath, and Eid-e-Milad-un-Nabi.

== Mazaar Sharif ==
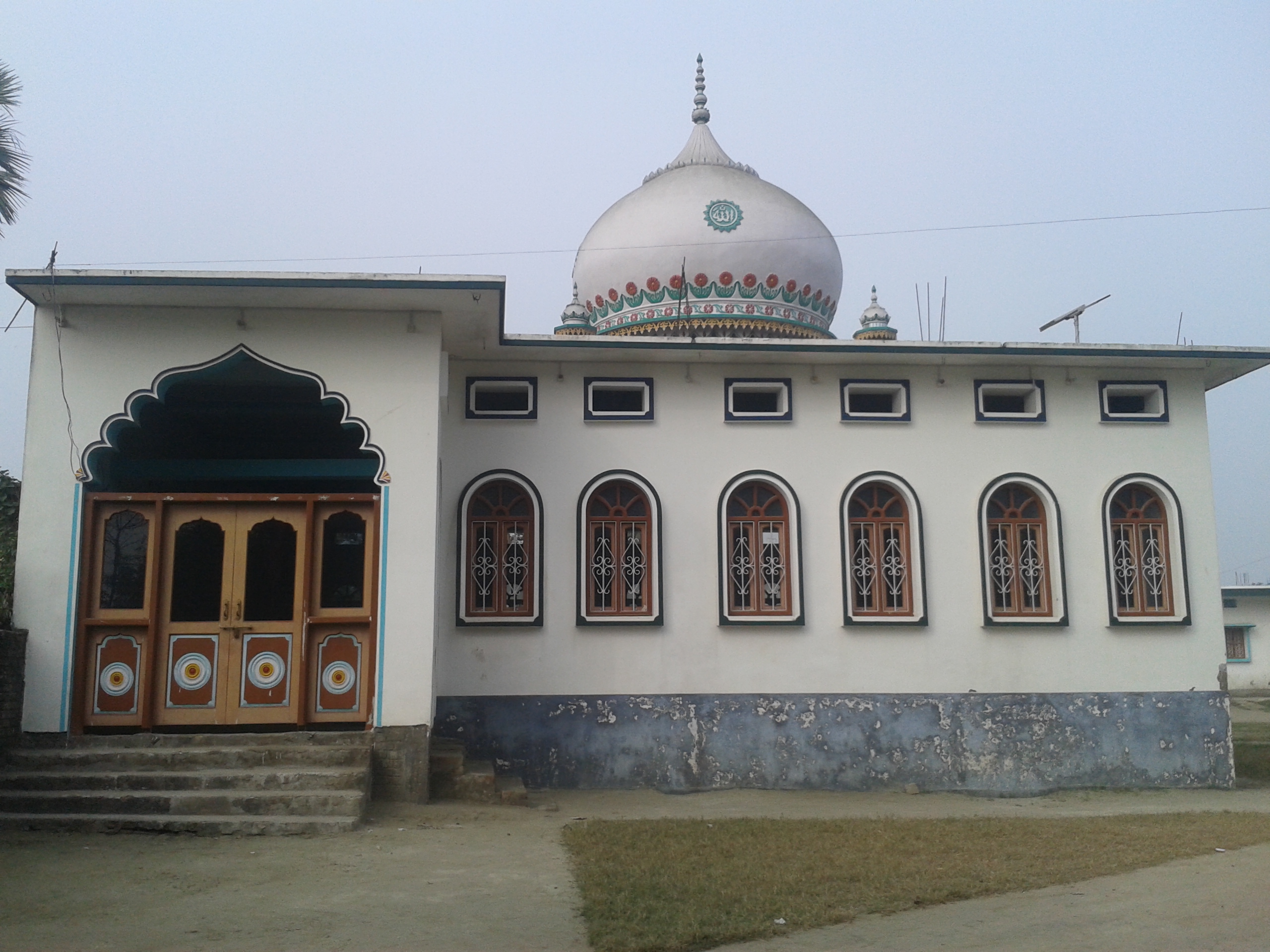
Front View of Hussaini Mazaar.

The Sufi saints Junab Ali and Umar Ali were buried in the enclosure of Hussaini Mazaar. The Urs-e-Mubarak is celebrated every year on 6 Rabi al-Akhir by Islamic calendar.
