= Motihari Assembly constituency =

Coordinates: 26°39′N 84°55′E

Motihari
- Constituency No. 19 for the Bihar Legislative Assembly

Constituency details
- Country: India
- Region: East India
- State: Bihar
- Division: Tirhut
- District: East Champaran
- Lok Sabha constituency: Purvi Champaran
- Established: 1951
- Total electors: 292,635
- Reservation: None

Member of Legislative Assembly
- 18th Bihar Legislative Assembly
- Incumbent Pramod Kumar
- Party: BJP
- Alliance: NDA
- Elected year: 2025
- Preceded by: Rama Devi

Motihari Assembly constituency is an assembly constituency in Purvi Champaran district in the Indian state of Bihar. In 2015 Bihar Legislative Assembly election, Motihari will be one of the 36 seats to have VVPAT enabled electronic voting machines.

== Overview ==
As per orders of Delimitation of Parliamentary and Assembly constituencies Order, 2008, 19. Motihari Assembly constituency is composed of the following: Motihari community development block including Motihari nagar parishad and Lautnaha notified area and Piprakothi CD block.

Motihari Assembly constituency is part of 3. Purvi Champaran (Lok Sabha constituency). It was earlier part of Motihari (Lok Sabha constituency).

== Members of the Legislative Assembly ==
Year	Name	Party
1952	Shakuntala Devi	Indian National Congress
1957	Bigoo Ram	Indian National Congress
1962	Shakuntala Devi	Indian National Congress
1967	Chandrika Prasad Yadav	Bharatiya Jana Sangh
1969	Ram Sevak Jaiswal	Indian National Congress
1972	Prabhawati Gupta	Indian National Congress
1977	Prabhawati Gupta	Indian National Congress
1980	Prabhawati Gupta	Indian National Congress (I)
1985	Triveni Tiwari	Communist Party of India
1990	Triveni Tiwari	Communist Party of India
1995	Triveni Tiwari	Communist Party of India
2000	Rama Devi	Rashtriya Janata Dal
2005	Pramod Kumar	Bharatiya Janata Party
2005	Pramod Kumar	Bharatiya Janata Party
2010	Pramod Kumar	Bharatiya Janata Party
2015	Pramod Kumar	Bharatiya Janata Party
2020	Pramod Kumar	Bharatiya Janata Party
2025	Pramod Kumar	Bharatiya Janata Party

== Election results ==
=== 2025 ===
2025 Bihar Legislative Assembly election: Motihari
Party	Candidate	Votes	%	±%
BJP	Pramod Kumar	106,080	49.5	▲0.06
RJD	Dewa Gupta	92,517	43.17	▲1.54
JSP	Atul Kumar	6,592	3.08	
Independent	Divyanshu Bhardwaj	2,082	0.97	
NOTA	None of the above	2,801	1.31	▼0.53
Majority		13,563	6.33	▼1.48
Turnout		214,311	73.23	▲13.56
BJP hold		Swing		

=== 2020 ===
Bihar Assembly election, 2020: Motihari
Party	Candidate	Votes	%	±%
BJP	Pramod Kumar	92,733	49.44	+1.99
RJD	Om Prakash Choudhary	78,088	41.63	+5.17
RLSP	Deepak Kumar Kushwaha	3,716	1.98	
Independent	Rameshvar Sah	3,263	1.74	
Independent	Zalaluddin Roy	1,847	0.98	
NOTA	None of the above	3,455	1.84	+0.3
Majority		14,645	7.81	−3.18
Turnout		187,555	59.67	+2.08
BJP hold		Swing		

=== 2015 ===
2015 Bihar Legislative Assembly election: Motihari
Party	Candidate	Votes	%	±%
BJP	Pramod Kumar	79,947	47.45	
RJD	Binod Kumar Shrivastava	61,430	36.46	
Independent	Manoj Kumar	7,619	4.52	
BSP	Ravi Bhushan Prasad	6,369	3.78	
Aap Aur Hum Party	Harishchandra Pandit	2,956	1.75	
CPI(M)	Arvind Kumar	2,242	1.33	
CPI	Tribeni Tiwari	1,905	1.13	
Independent	Tafajjul Hussain	1,570	0.93	
NOTA	None of the above	2,589	1.54	
Majority		18,517	10.99	
Turnout		168,493	57.59	
