= Trilokwa =

- Village
- Trilokwa
- Location within Bihar Location within India
- Coordinates: 26°21′28.99″N 84°53′58.86″E
- Country: India
- State: Bihar
- District: East Champaran

Government
  - Type: Panchayati Raj
  - Body: Gram Panchayat

Area
  - Total: 45 km^{2} (17 sq mi)
- Elevation: 60 m (200 ft)

Population (2024)
  - Total: 11,000
  - Rank: auto
  - Density: 240/km^{2} (630/sq mi)

Languages
  - Official: Bhojpuri, Urdu, Hindi, English,
- Time zone: UTC+5:30 (IST)
- PIN: 845432
- Vehicle registration: BR05
- Website: www.trilokwa.co.in

Trilokwa is a village located in East Champaran district in the state of Bihar, India. Trilokwa is considered India's Biggest village. The village is located 5 km from Kesariya, 8 km From Kesaria Stupa, about 100 km from the state capital Patna, and 200 km from Valmiki National Park, a tiger reserve.

The village follows the Panchayati raj system.
