= Purvi Champaran Lok Sabha constituency =

Constituency of the Indian parliament in Bihar

Coordinates: 26.6°N 84.9°E

Purvi Champaran
- Lok Sabha constituency

Constituency details
- Country: India
- Region: East India
- State: Bihar
- Assembly constituencies: Harsidhi; Govindganj; Kesaria; Kalyanpur; Pipra; Motihari
- Established: 2008
- Reservation: None

Member of Parliament
- 18th Lok Sabha
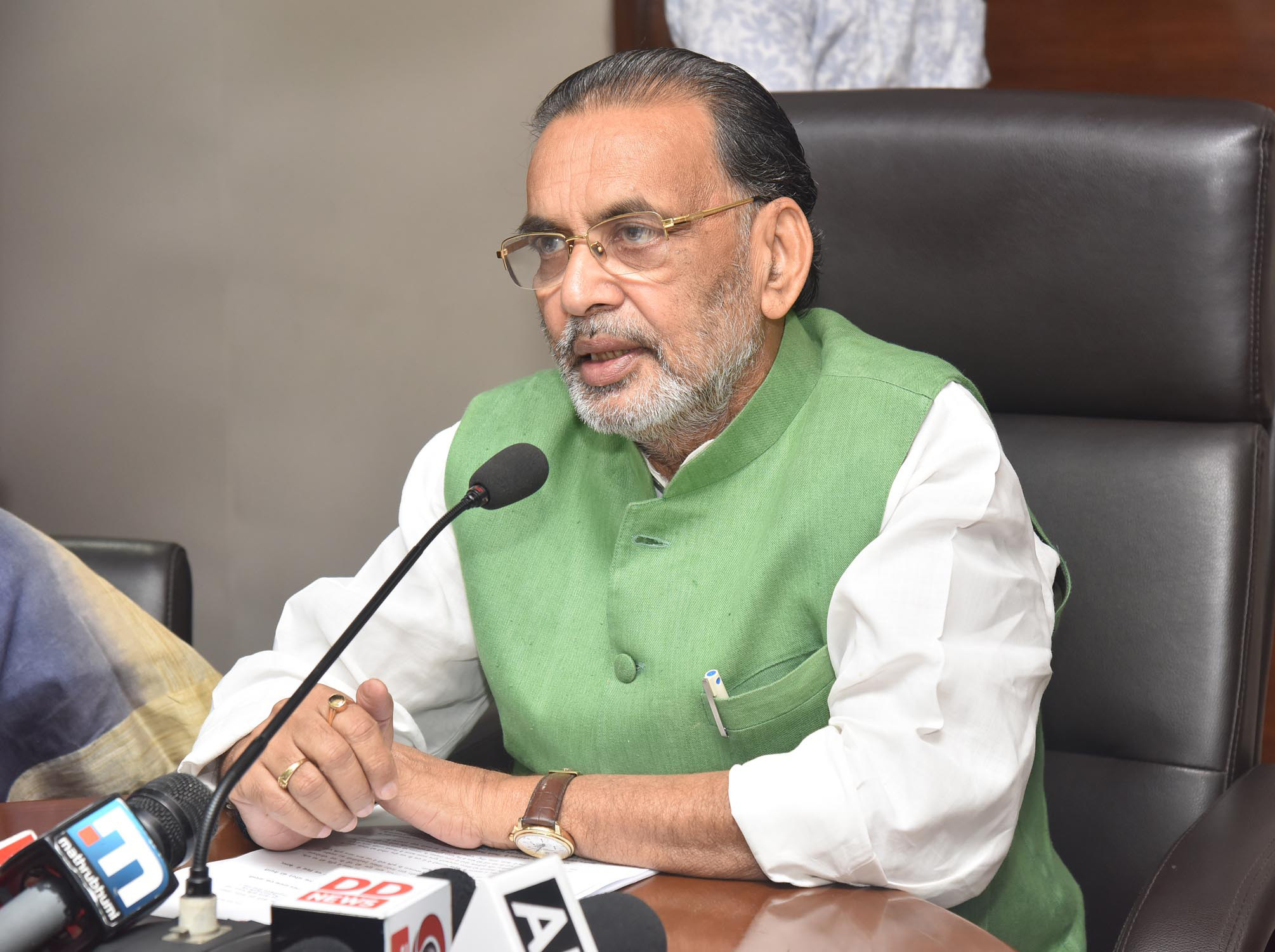
- Incumbent Radha Mohan Singh
- Party: Bharatiya Janata Party
- Alliance: NDA
- Elected year: 2024

Purvi Champaran Lok Sabha constituency is one of the 40 Lok Sabha (parliamentary) constituencies in Bihar state in eastern India. This constituency came into existence in 2008 as a part of the implementation of delimitation of parliamentary constituencies based on the recommendations of the Delimitation Commission of India constituted in 2002.

== Related proposals ==
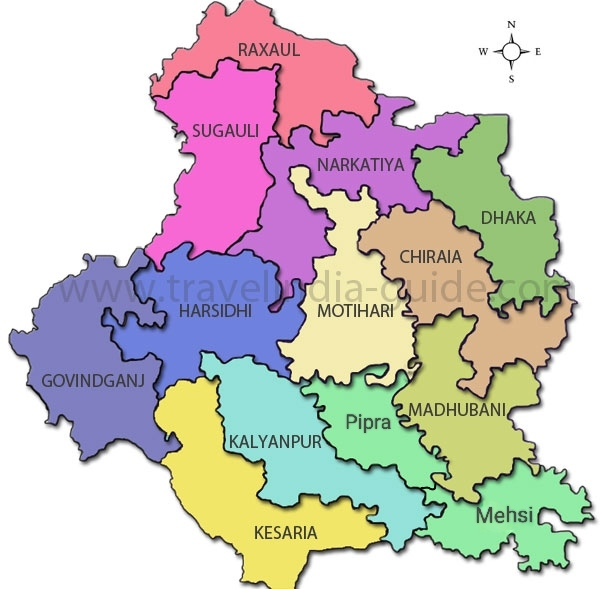
Map showing the boundaries of East Champaran Lok Sabha constituency in Bihar, India. Mehsi is a town located in East Champaran district, known for agriculture, litchi production, small-scale button industries, local trade, and cultural significance.

There have been public discussions and local-level demands in the Mehsi region for the creation of a separate Mehsi Assembly constituency, GI Tag and Mehsi Subdivision. The demand is mainly associated with Mehsi block and nearby areas, including Tetaria and Salempur blocks of East Champaran district. Supporters of the proposal argue that Mehsi has a distinct cultural and economic identity within the district, with agriculture (especially litchi production), small industries, and local trade forming an important part of its economy. They also state that administrative restructuring could improve local governance and representation.

== Assembly segments ==
Presently, Purvi Champaran Lok Sabha constituency comprises the following six Vidhan Sabha (legislative assembly) segments:

#	Name	District	Member	Party	2024 Lead
13	Harsidhi (SC)	East Champaran	Krishnanandan Paswan	BJP	VIP
14	Govindganj	East Champaran	Raju Tiwari	LJP(RV)	BJP
15	Kesaria	East Champaran	Shalini Mishra	JD(U)	BJP
16	Kalyanpur	East Champaran	Sachindra Prasad Singh	BJP	BJP
17	Pipra	East Champaran	Shyambabu Yadav	BJP	BJP
19	Motihari	East Champaran	Pramod Kumar	BJP	BJP

== Members of Parliament ==
Year	Name	Party
Till 2008 : See Motihari
2009	Radha Mohan Singh	Bharatiya Janata Party
2014	Radha Mohan Singh	Bharatiya Janata Party
2019	Radha Mohan Singh	Bharatiya Janata Party
2024	Radha Mohan Singh	Bharatiya Janata Party

== Election results ==
=== 2024 ===
2024 Indian general elections: Purvi Champaran
Party	Candidate	Votes	%	±%
BJP	Radha Mohan Singh	542,193	50.50	
VIP	Rajesh Kushwaha	4,53,906	42.28	
NOTA	None of the Above	19,788	1.84	
Margin of victory		88,287		
Turnout		10,74,344	59.90	
BJP hold		Swing		

=== 2019 ===
2019 Indian general elections: Purvi Champaran
Party	Candidate	Votes	%	±%
BJP	Radha Mohan Singh	574,081	57.81	
RLSP	Akash Prasad Singh	2,81,500	28.43	
NOTA	None of the Above	22,706	2.27	
Margin of victory		2,93,648	29.38	
Turnout		10,00,135	60.30	
BJP hold		Swing		

=== 2014 ===
2014 Indian general elections: Purvi Champaran
Party	Candidate	Votes	%	±%
BJP	Radha Mohan Singh	400,452	48.68	+6.94
RJD	Binod Kumar Srivastava	2,08,289	25.32	+0.04
JD(U)	Avaneesh Kumar Singh	1,28,604	15.63	+15.63
AAP	Amit Kumar Choubey	77,512	10.91	+10.91
NOTA	None of the Above	13,261	1.61	
Margin of victory		1,92,163	23.36	
Turnout		8,22,671	58.09	
BJP hold		Swing		

=== 2009 ===
2009 Indian general elections: Purvi Champaran
Party	Candidate	Votes	%	±%
BJP	Radha Mohan Singh	201,114	41.72	
RJD	Akhilesh Prasad Singh	1,21,824	25.27	28%
INC	Arvind Kumar Gupta	68,323	14.17	
LTSD	Nagendra Sahani	31,057	6.44	
CPI	Ram Chandra Prasad	20,742	4.30	
Margin of victory		79,290	16.45	
Turnout		4,82,094	40.61	
BJP win (new seat)				

== See also ==
- East Champaran district
- List of constituencies of the Lok Sabha
