= Budhimai =

Village in India

Budhi mai
- वृद्धाम्बा बुढ़ीमाई
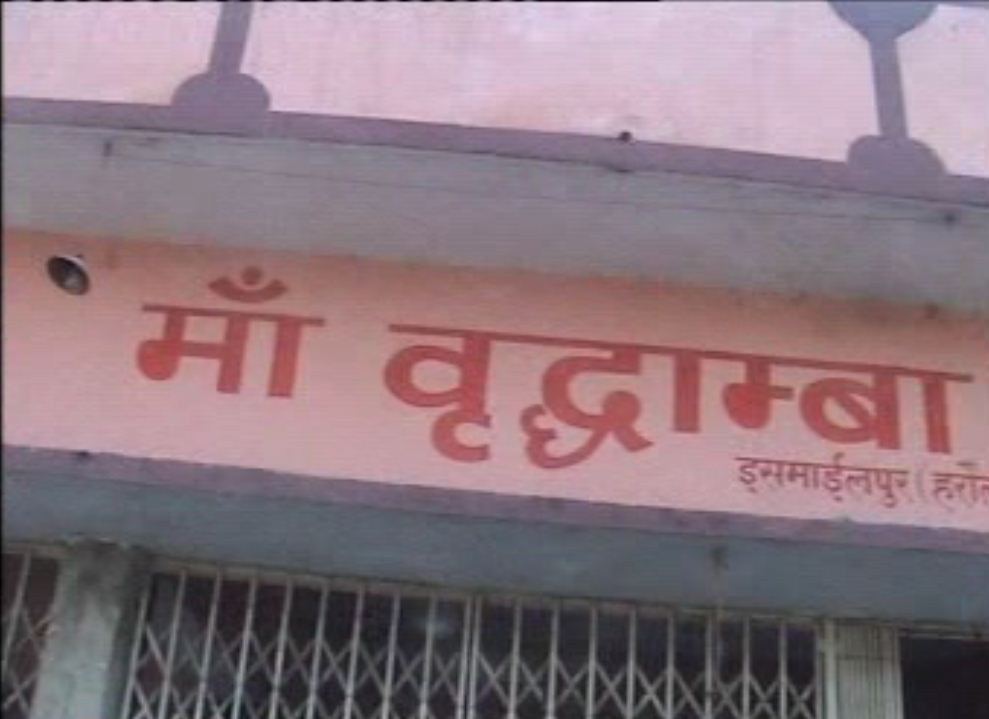
- Budhi mai temple in Ismailpur Haruli village

Religion
- Affiliation: Hinduism
- District: Vaishali district

Location
- Location: Ismailpur
- State: Bihar
- Country: India
- Interactive map of Budhi mai
- Coordinates: 25°45′35.0″N 85°11′33.0″E

Budhi Mai is a village in the Vaishali district, Bihar, India. It is a tourist destination with a rich a cultural and of historical heritage, and is a place of worship. The Budhi Mai Temple is situated in Vaishali, Haruli, Ismailpur, near the State Bank of India, Lalganj Road, Vaishali. Budhi Mai Fair/Mela ) is held in the month of July and August on Budhi Mai Campus, attracting visitors from all over Bihar.
