= Akhilesh Prasad Singh =

Indian politician

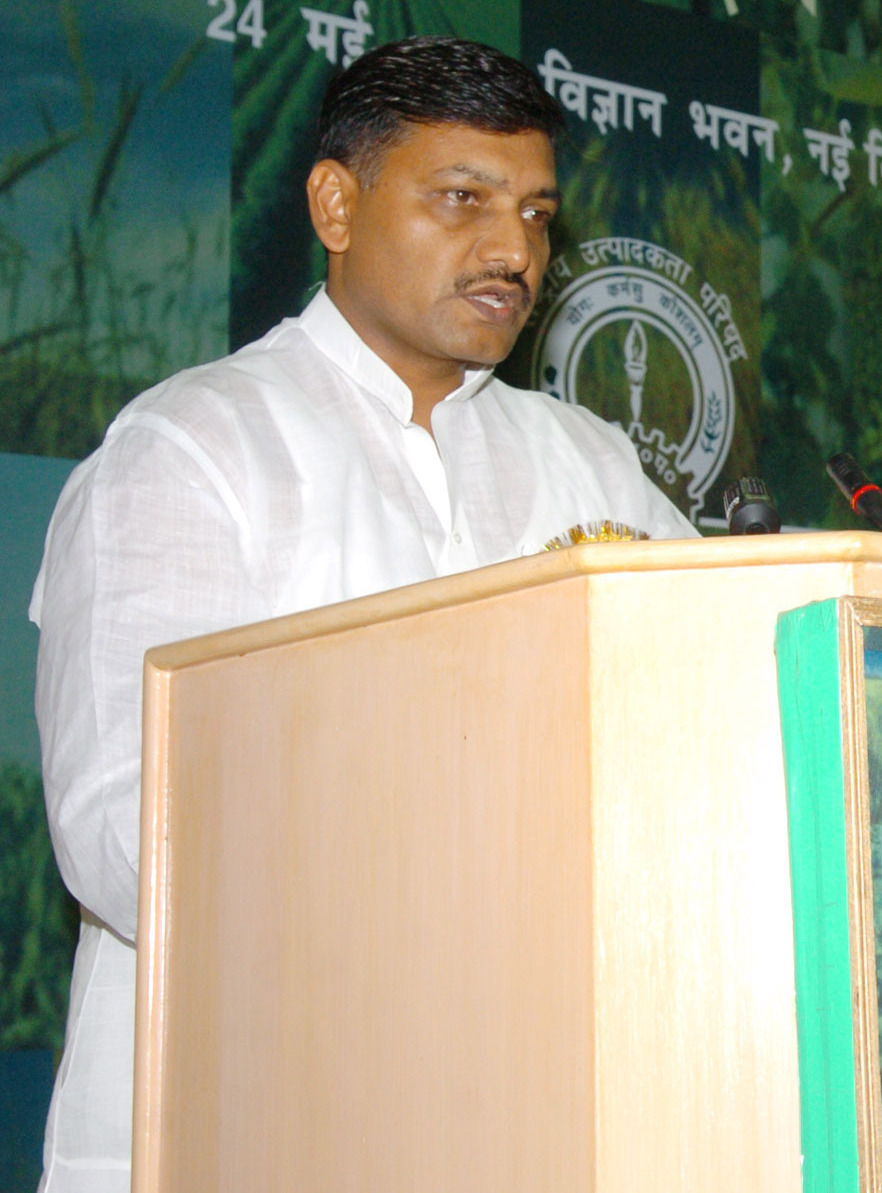

President of Bihar Pradesh Congress Committee
- In office 5 December 2022 – 18 March 2025
- Preceded by: Madan Mohan Jha
- Succeeded by: Rajesh Kumar

Member of Parliament, Rajya Sabha
- Incumbent
- Assumed office 3 April 2018
- Preceded by: Ali Anwar, JD(U)
- Constituency: Bihar

Member of Parliament, Lok Sabha
- In office 16 May 2004 – 16 May 2009
- Preceded by: Radha Mohan Singh
- Succeeded by: constituency abolished
- Constituency: Motihari

Member of Bihar Legislative Assembly
- In office 2000–2004
- Preceded by: Ravindra Singh Kushwaha
- Succeeded by: Dularchand Singh Yadav
- Constituency: Arwal

Personal details
- Born: 5 January 1962 (age 64) Jehanabad, Bihar, India
- Party: Indian National Congress
- Website: Official Website

Akhilesh Prasad Singh (born 5 January 1962) is an Indian politician from Bihar, India. He is a member of the Indian National Congress. In 2018, he was elected to Rajya Sabha from Bihar as member of Congress. He was appointed Bihar Pradesh Congress Committee President on 5 December 2022.

== Political career ==
Singh was an MLA from 2000 to 2004 in Arwal. He was a member of parliament of the 14th Lok Sabha (2004) from Motihari as member of Rashtriya Janata Dal. He lost from Purvi Champaran in 2009 and Muzaffarpur in 2014 Indian general election on Indian National Congress ticket. Singh also lost the 2015 Bihar Legislative Assembly election from Tarari constituency to Sudama Prasad.
