= Rama Devi (Bihar politician) =

Indian politician

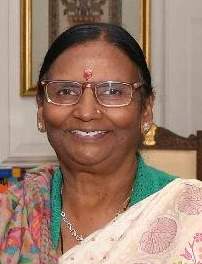

Member of Parliament for Sheohar Lok Sabha
- In office 16 May 2009-4 June 2024
- Preceded by: Sitaram Singh
- Succeeded by: Lovely Anand

Member of Parliament for Motihari Lok Sabha
- In office 1998-1999
- Preceded by: Radha Mohan Singh
- Succeeded by: Radha Mohan Singh

Cabinet Minister Government of Bihar
- In office 2000-2005
- Chief Minister: Rabri Devi
- Ministry & Department's: Public Health; Engineering

Member of the Bihar Legislative Assembly for Motihari
- In office 2000-2005
- Preceded by: Triveni Tiwari
- Succeeded by: Pramod Kumar

Personal details
- Born: 5 May 1949 (age 76) Lalganj, Vaishali (Bihar)
- Party: Bharatiya Janata Party
- Other political affiliations: Rashtriya Janata Dal
- Spouse: Brij Bihari Prasad (late)
- Children: 5

Rama Devi (born 5 May 1949) is an Indian politician from Bihar and belongs to Bharatiya Janata Party. She is on the Panel of chairpersons of the 17th Lok Sabha as of 2019.

== Biography ==
Rama Devi was born on 5 May 1949 at Lalganj in Vaishali district. She had studied Law and resides at Muzaffarpur. She was member of 12th Lok Sabha from Bihar during 1998-1999 from Motihari on RJD ticket.

She was first elected to 15th Lok Sabha in 2009 on the BJP ticket from Sheohar Lok Sabha constituency. She was elected for second time to Lok Sabha (16th) in 2014. She is elected for third time to Lok Sabha (17th) in 2019. In 2019, she was in the midst of a controversy when Samajwadi Party's MP Azam Khan made some sexist remarks directed at her, for which he was forced to apologize.
