= Rajesh Kushwaha =

Indian politician

Dr. Rajesh Kumar

Member of Bihar Legislative Assembly (2015-20)
- Constituency: Kesaria Constituency

Personal details
- Party: Vikassheel Insaan Party, Rashtriya Janata Dal
- Occupation: Politics

Rajesh Kushwaha alias Rajesh Kumar is an Indian politician and a former member of Bihar Legislative Assembly. He was elected to the lower house of Bihar legislature as a candidate of Rashtriya Janata Dal (RJD) in 2015. In 2020, the RJD chose Santosh Kushwaha, replacing him, as party candidate for the Kesaria Assembly constituency. Hence, he contested the Bihar Assembly elections of 2020 as an independent candidate, losing to Shalini Mishra of Janata Dal (United). He also contested the 2024 general election to Lok Sabha from Purvi Champaran as an alliance candidate of the Vikassheel Insaan Party.

== Political career ==
In 2015 assembly elections, he defeated Rajendra Prasad Gupta of Bhartiya Janata Party by getting 62,902 votes; latter got 46,955 votes. However, in 2020, the contest became tripolar. Kumar was not allotted the symbol of RJD; hence decided to contest independently, without affiliation of any political party. On the other hand, Shalini Mishra on the symbol of Janata Dal (United) and candidates from Rashtriya Lok Samata Party (Maheswar Singh) and Lok Janshakti Party made division of votes inevitable. This led to defeat of Dr. Rajesh Kushwaha. The number of votes cast in his favour stood low.

In 2024 Lok Sabha elections, he was given party symbol of Vikassheel Insaan Party and made a candidate from Purvi Champaran Lok Sabha constituency against Radha Mohan Singh.

== Personal life ==
He completed his Bachelor of Ayurveda Medicine and Surgery degree from R.N. Mukherjee Ayurvedik Medical College, Motihari, B.U. Muzaffarpur in 2011.
