= Areraj =

Town in Bihar, India

- Town
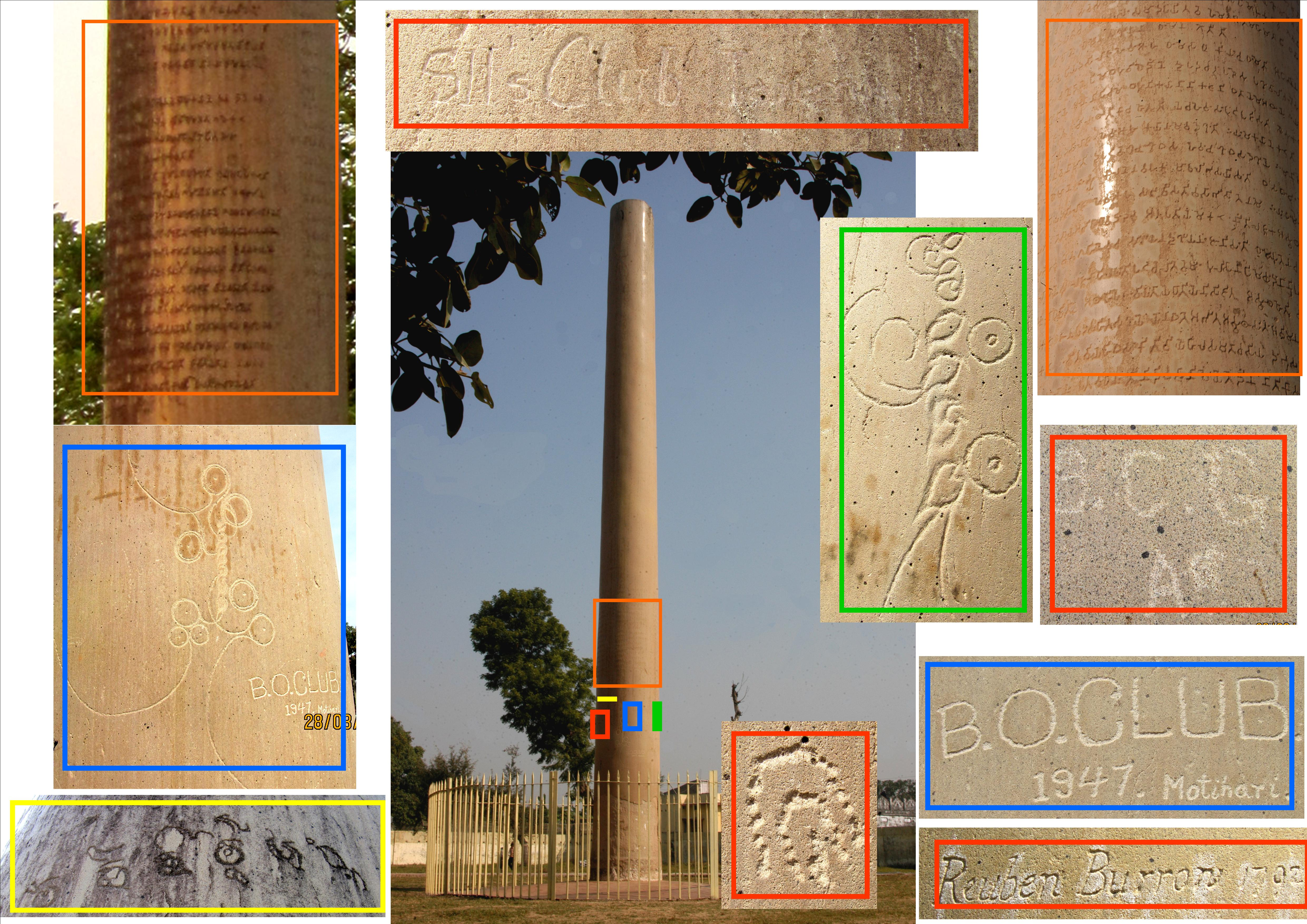
- Nickname: City of mahakal
- Location in Bihar, India
- Coordinates: 26.55031°N 84.68013°E
- Country: India
- State: Bihar
- District: Purvi Champaran

Government
  - Type: Nagar Panchayat
  - Body: Nagar Panchayat areraj

Population (2011)
  - Total: 26,014
- Demonym: Arerajbasi

Languages
  - Official: Bhojpuri - Hindi
- Time zone: UTC+5:30 (IST)
- Telephone code: 91 6258
- Lok Sabha constituency: Purvi Champaran
- Vidhan Sabha constituency: Govindganj
- Website: eastchamparan.bih.nic.in

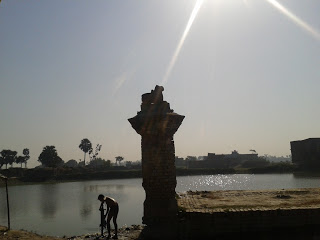
Gwalin Pokhra

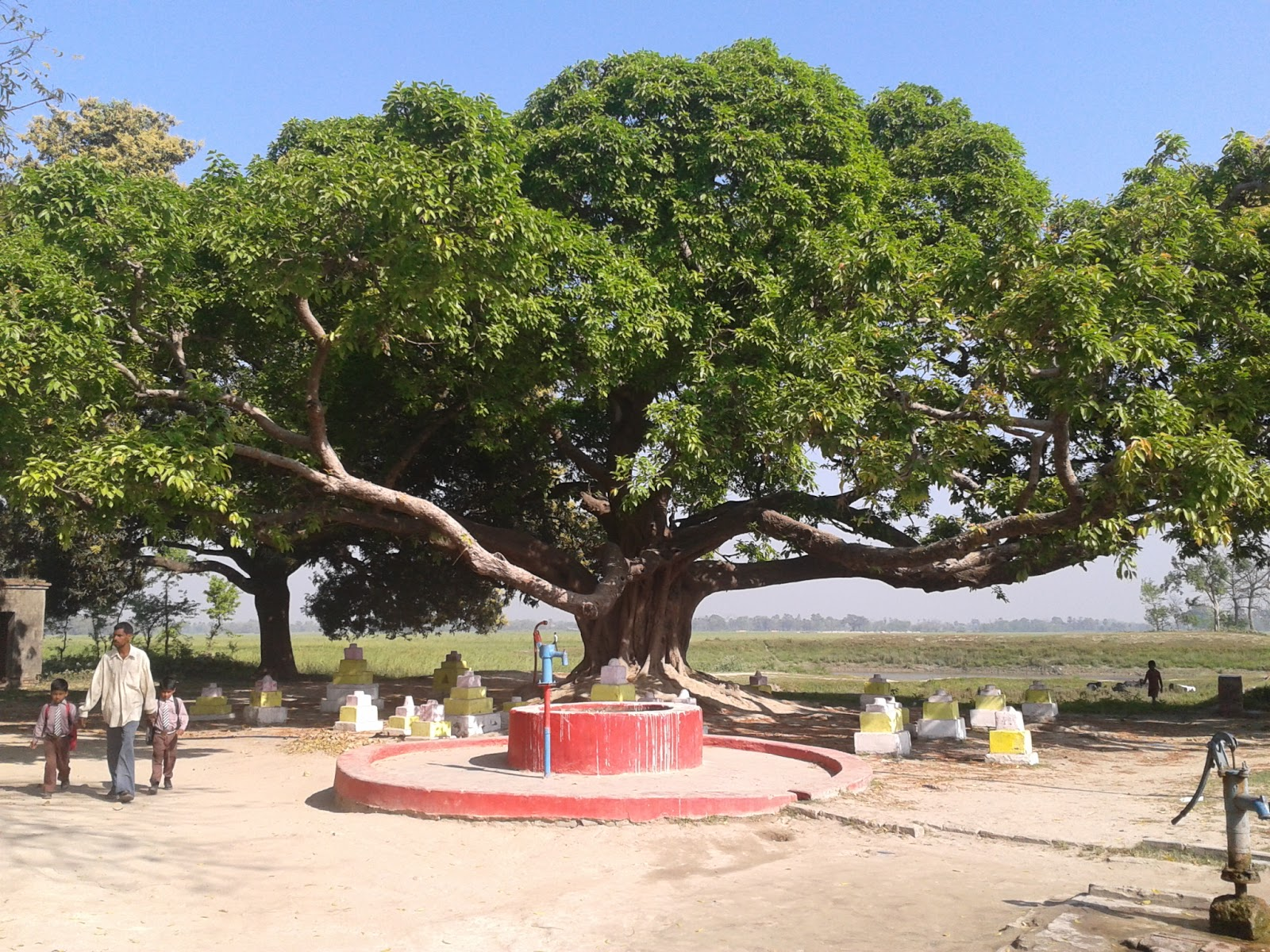
Jalpa Bhwani

Areraj is a town and a notified area in East Champaran district in the state of Bihar, India.

== Geography ==
Areraj is situated in the western part of East Champaran district in Bihar. It lies approximately 30 km southwest of Motihari, around 53 km northwest of Mehsi, and about 45 km east-northeast of Gopalganj by road.

== Demographics ==
As of 2011 India census, Areraj had a population of 26,014 with males constituting 52% of the population and females 48%. Areraj has an average literacy rate of 45%, lower than the national average of 59.5%; with 64% of males and 36% of females literate. 20% of the population is under 6 years of age.

== Climate ==
Climate is characterised by high temperatures and evenly distributed precipitation throughout the year. The Köppen Climate Classification sub-type for this climate is "Cfa" (Humid Subtropical Climate).

Climate data for Areraj
Month	Jan	Feb	Mar	Apr	May	Jun	Jul	Aug	Sep	Oct	Nov	Dec	Year
Mean daily maximum °C (°F)	23 (73)	25.7 (78.3)	31.9 (89.4)	35.8 (96.4)	37.4 (99.3)	35.2 (95.4)	32.7 (90.9)	32.2 (90.0)	31.9 (89.4)	31.6 (88.9)	28.4 (83.1)	24.5 (76.1)	30.9 (87.5)
Mean daily minimum °C (°F)	9.3 (48.7)	10.9 (51.6)	15.7 (60.3)	20.7 (69.3)	24.8 (76.6)	26 (79)	25.6 (78.1)	25.9 (78.6)	25.2 (77.4)	21.5 (70.7)	14.2 (57.6)	10 (50)	19.2 (66.5)
Average precipitation mm (inches)	21 (0.8)	8 (0.3)	13 (0.5)	12 (0.5)	38 (1.5)	189 (7.4)	313 (12.3)	297 (11.7)	201 (7.9)	56 (2.2)	5 (0.2)	2 (0.1)	1,155 (45.4)
Source: climate-data
