= Rajan Tiwari =

Indian politician

Member of the Bihar Legislative Assembly
- In office 2000–2005
- Preceded by: Bhupendra Nath Dubey
- Succeeded by: Meena Dwivedi
- Constituency: Govindganj

Personal details
- Born: Rajan Kumar Tiwari; 1974 (age 51–52) Gorakhpur, Uttar Pradesh
- Party: Bharatiya Janata Party
- Other political affiliations: Rashtriya Janata Dal Lok Janshakti Party Independent
- Relations: Raju Tiwari (brother)
- Parent(s): Kanti Devi Tiwari (mother), Vishwajeewan Ram Tiwari (father)

Rajan Tiwari (born 1974) is an Indian politician and a former Member of the Bihar Legislative Assembly. He contested his first election as an independent candidate in the year 2000 and got elected to the Bihar Legislative Assembly from the Govindganj Assembly constituency. He was defeated by Meena Dwivedi of Janata Dal (United).

== Family ==
Rajan Tiwari is the son of Kanti Devi Tiwari (mother) and Vishwajeewan Ram Tiwari (father).

Rajan Tiwari belongs to the Brahmin community and originally hails from Gorakhpur. His elder brother Raju Tiwari was elected as an MLA from the Govindganj constituency in Bihar on the ticket of Lok Janshakti Party in 2015 election.

== Political career ==
Rajan Tiwari started his political career in year 2000 when he defeated Bhupendra Nath Dubey of SAP 2000. In 2006, his mother Kanti Devi was elected Block Head from the local block and continues to hold the post.
