= Kalyanpur, Purvi Champaran Assembly constituency =

Coordinates: 26°30′51″N 84°50′54″E

Kalyanpur, Purvi Champaran
- Constituency No. 16 for the Bihar Legislative Assembly

Constituency details
- Country: India
- Region: East India
- State: Bihar
- District: East Champaran
- Lok Sabha constituency: Purvi Champaran
- Established: 2008
- Total electors: 256,338
- Reservation: None

Member of Legislative Assembly
- 18th Bihar Legislative Assembly
- Incumbent Sachindra Prasad Singh
- Party: BJP
- Alliance: NDA
- Elected year: 2025

Kalyanpur is an assembly constituency in East Champaran district in the Indian state of Bihar.

== Overview ==
As per orders of Delimitation of Parliamentary and Assembly constituencies Order, 2008, 16. Kalyanpur Assembly constituency is composed of the following: Kotwa community development block; Parsauni Wazid, Bakhri, Kalyanpur, Barharwa Mahanand, Siswa Shobh, Brindaban, Pakari Dixit, Siswa Kharar, Patna, Gariba, Shambhu Chak, Sitalpur, Koela Belwa, Bhuwan Chhapra, Banshghat, North Gawandra, South Gawandra and Mani Chhapra gram panchayats of Kalyanpur CD Block.

Kalyanpur Assembly constituency is part of 3. Purvi Champaran (Lok Sabha constituency).

== Members of the Legislative Assembly ==
Year	Name	Party
Until 2008: Constituency did not exist
2010	Razia Khatoon	Janata Dal (United)
2015	Sachindra Prasad Singh	Bharatiya Janata Party
2020	Manoj Kumar Yadav	Rashtriya Janata Dal
2025	Sachindra Prasad Singh	Bharatiya Janata Party

== Election results ==
=== 2025 ===
2025 Bihar Legislative Assembly election: Kalyanpur
Party	Candidate	Votes	%	±%
BJP	Sachindra Prasad Singh	89,057	47.82	+3.21
RJD	Manoj Kumar Yadav	73,489	39.46	−5.89
JSP	Mantosh Kumar Sahni	5,206	2.8	
BSP	Md Badiuzzaman	4,490	2.41	−1.56
Independent	Ashok Kumar Yadav	2,605	1.4	
Independent	Subodh Kumar	2,512	1.35	
Lohiya Janta Dal	Arvind Kumar Pandey	2,250	1.21	
NOTA	None of the above	3,260	1.75	−0.05
Majority		15,568	8.36	+7.62
Turnout		186,215	72.64	+10.12
BJP gain from RJD		Swing		

=== 2020 ===
2020 Bihar Legislative Assembly election: Kalyanpur
Party	Candidate	Votes	%	±%
RJD	Manoj Kumar Yadav	72,819	45.35	
BJP	Sachindra Prasad Singh	71,626	44.61	+7.67
BSP	Mohammad Badiuzzaman	6,367	3.97	+2.65
Janta Dal Rashtravadi	Mala Thakur	2,006	1.25	
Independent	Rituraj Pandey	1,797	1.12	
Independent	Rajesh Kumar Singh	1,623	1.01	
NOTA	None of the above	2,887	1.8	−1.34
Majority		1,193	0.74	−7.74
Turnout		160,557	62.52	+2.7
RJD gain from BJP		Swing		

=== 2015 ===
In the 8 November 2015 state assembly elections, Sachindra Singh of the Bharatiya Janta p Party (BJP) won the newly created 16 Kalyanpur assembly seat, defeating her rival Raziya Khatoon of Janta Dal United (JDU).

2015 Bihar Legislative Assembly election: Kalyanpur, Purvi Champaran
Party	Candidate	Votes	%	±%
BJP	Sachindra Prasad Singh	50,060	36.94	
JD(U)	Razia Khatoon	38,572	28.46	
SP	Manoj Kumar Yadav	26,430	19.5	
CPI	Ramayan Singh	4,657	3.44	
Independent	Pintu Rani	3,341	2.47	
Independent	Umesh Kumar Singh	2,243	1.66	
BSP	Suresh Mukhiya	1,793	1.32	
Aam Janta Party Rashtriya	Mahtab Alam	1,454	1.07	
Sarvajan Kalyan Loktantrik Party	Brajesh Ojha	1,393	1.03	
Garib Janta Dal (Secular)	Pramod Giri	1,320	0.97	
NOTA	None of the above	4,260	3.14	
Majority		11,488	8.48	
Turnout		135,523	59.82	
