= Sunil Mani Tiwari =

Indian politician

Member of Bihar Legislative Assembly
- In office 2020–2025
- Preceded by: Raju Tiwari
- Succeeded by: Raju Tiwari
- Constituency: Govindaganj

Personal details
- Born: 12 September 1963 (age 62)
- Party: Bharatiya Janata Party
- Occupation: Politician

Sunil Mani Tiwari is an Indian politician from Bihar and a former member of the Bihar Legislative Assembly. He is also former chairman of Areraj and former BJP district president from East-champaran during 2014 general election. Tiwari won the Govindganj Constituency on the BJP ticket in the 2020 Bihar Legislative Assembly election.
