= Radha Mohan Singh =

Indian politician (born 1949)

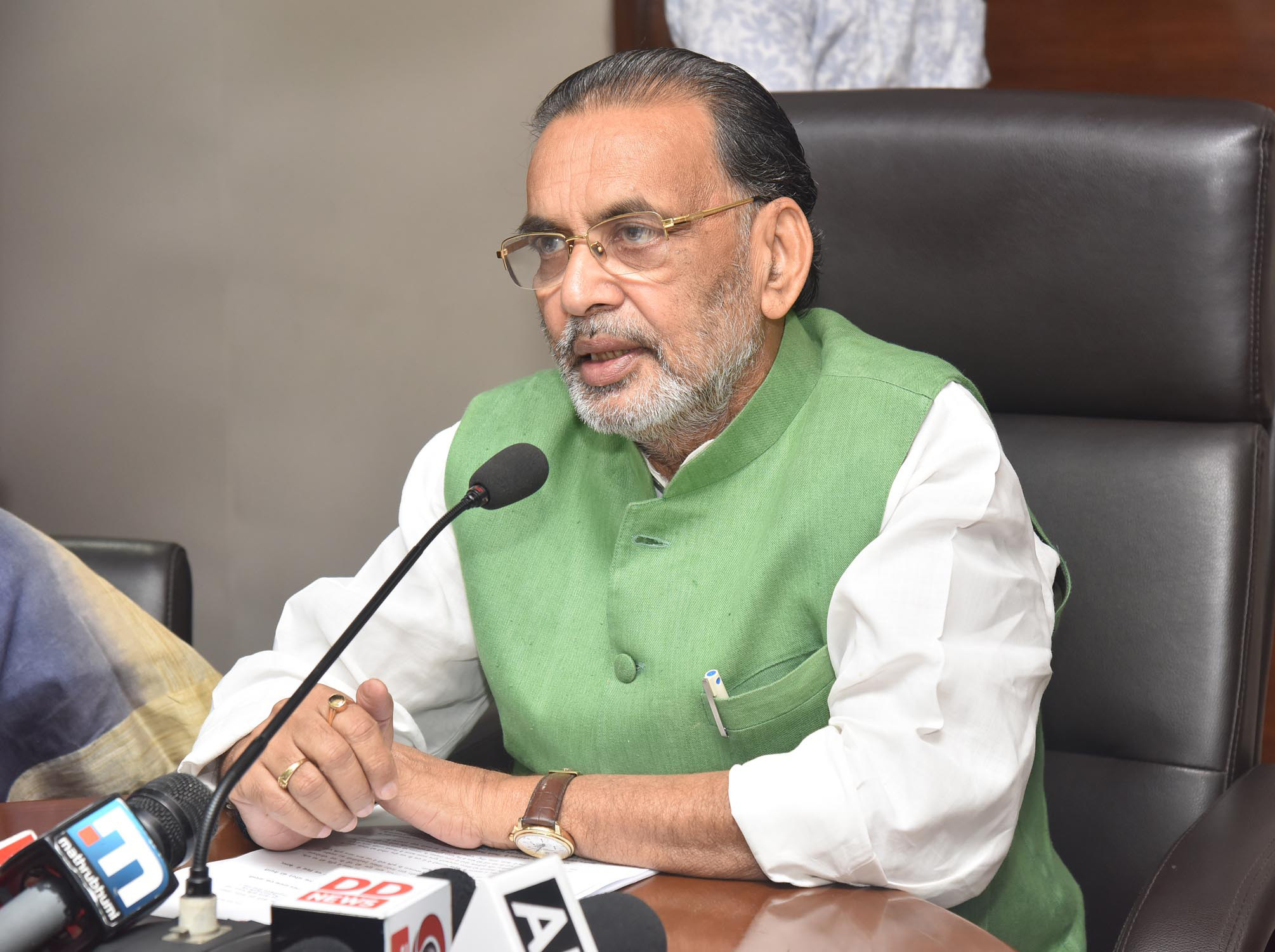
- Singh in 2017

National Vice-President of Bharatiya Janata Party
- In office 26 September 2020 – 2023
- President: Jagat Prakash Nadda
- Incharge: Uttar Pradesh

Union Minister of Agriculture & Farmers Welfare
- In office 26 May 2014 – 30 May 2019
- Prime Minister: Narendra Modi
- Preceded by: Sharad Pawar
- Succeeded by: Narendra Singh Tomar

Member of Parliament, Lok Sabha
- Incumbent
- Assumed office 16 May 2009
- Preceded by: Akhilesh Prasad Singh (from Motihari)
- Constituency: Purvi Champaran, Bihar
- In office 6 October 1999 – 16 May 2004
- Preceded by: Rama Devi
- Succeeded by: Akhilesh Prasad Singh
- Constituency: Motihari, Bihar
- In office 10 May 1996 – 4 December 1997
- Preceded by: Kamla Mishra Madhukar
- Succeeded by: Rama Devi
- Constituency: Motihari, Bihar
- In office 21 November 1989 – 21 June 1991
- Preceded by: Prabhawati Gupta
- Succeeded by: Kamla Mishra Madhukar
- Constituency: Motihari, Bihar

President of Bharatiya Janata Party, Bihar
- In office 2006–2010
- Preceded by: Sushil Kumar Modi
- Succeeded by: C. P. Thakur

Co-Incharge of Bharatiya Janata Party, Uttar Pradesh
- In office 2010–2012

Incharge of Bharatiya Janata Party, Uttarakhand
- In office 2013–2014

Incharge of Bharatiya Janata Party, Uttar Pradesh
- In office 2020–2023

Personal details
- Born: 1 September 1949 (age 77) Narha Panapur, Bihar, India
- Party: Bharatiya Janata Party
- Spouse: Shanti Devi
- Children: 2 (1 son and 1 daughter)
- Education: M.S. College, Bihar University, Motihari
- Occupation: Politician; agriculturist
- Website: www.radhamohansingh.in

Radha Mohan Singh is an Indian politician from Bharatiya Janata Party (BJP). He served as the Union Minister of Agriculture & Farmers Welfare (2014-2019), during the First Modi ministry. He was also one of the national vice-presidents of the party (2020-2023). Singh was President of BJP's Bihar State unit from 2006 to 2009, BJP's Uttar Pradesh Co- incharge (2010–12) & Incharge (2020-2023), Uttarakhand BJP Incharge (2013-2014) and was 1st elected to 9th Lok Sabha in 1989 & currently is member of 18th Lok Sabha. He is the chairperson for Parliamentary Standing committee on Defence and was chairperson/member in multi-Parliamentary Standing committees, National Election Officer of BJP.

For the 7th term he is representing Purvi Champaran constituency in Bihar state. His stature has grown which can be traced by seeing his performance in the previous elections and his outstanding performance as Central minister in Agriculture ministry .

== Early life ==
Since his youth, he has been an active RSS Swayamsevak. He embarked upon a political career after becoming a member of Jan Sangh and BJP.

== Social And Cultural Activities ==
Associated with:

- Vaidyanath Seva Trust
- Rickshaw Chalak Kalyan Samiti, Motihari. Bihar
- Pandit Deen Dayal Upadhayaya Smriti

== Parliamentary career ==
He was first elected as Member of Parliament (MP) in 9th Lok Sabha (1989) & is currently Member of Parliament in 18th Lok Sabha (2024).

Lok Sabha
Preceded by Prabhawati Gupta	Member of Parliament for Motihari (Merged into Purvi Champaran in 2008); 1989 – 1991	Succeeded by Kamla Mishra Madhukar
Preceded by Kamla Mishra Madhukar	Member of Parliament for Motihari (Merged into Purvi Champaran in 2008); 1996 – 1998	Succeeded by Rama Devi
Preceded by Rama Devi	Member of Parliament for Motihari (Merged into Purvi Champaran in 2008); 1999 – 2004	Succeeded by Akhilesh Prasad Singh
Preceded by Constituency created in 2009	Member of Parliament for Purvi Champaran; 2009 – 2014	Succeeded by Radha Mohan Singh
Preceded by Radha Mohan Singh	Member of Parliament for Purvi Champaran; 2014 – 2019	Succeeded by Radha Mohan Singh
Preceded by Radha Mohan Singh	Member of Parliament for Purvi Champaran; 2019 – 2024	Succeeded by Radha Mohan Singh
Preceded by Radha Mohan Singh	Member of Parliament for Purvi Champaran; 2024 – Present	Succeeded by Incumbent
Political offices
Preceded by Sharad Pawar	Minister of Agriculture; 26 May 2014 – 24 May 2019	Succeeded by Narendra Singh Tomar

== See also ==
- List of politicians from Bihar
