= Kesaria Assembly constituency =

Coordinates: 26°20′21″N 84°51′00″E

Kesaria
- Constituency No. 15 for the Bihar Legislative Assembly

Constituency details
- Country: India
- Region: East India
- State: Bihar
- District: East Champaran
- Established: 1951
- Total electors: 260,633
- Reservation: None

Member of Legislative Assembly
- 18th Bihar Legislative Assembly
- Incumbent Shalini Mishra
- Party: JD(U)
- Alliance: NDA
- Elected year: 2025

Kesaria, sometimes spelt 'Kesariya', is an assembly constituency in East Champaran district in the Indian state of Bihar.

== Overview ==
As per orders of Delimitation of Parliamentary and Assembly constituencies Order, 2008, 15. Kesaria Assembly constituency is composed of the following: Kesaria community development block; Uttari Bariyaria, Paschhimi Madhubani, Uttari Madhubani, Dakshini Madhubani, Purbi Madhubani, Bhatwalia, Barwa, Bariyaria Tolarajpur, Uttari Bhawanipur, Dakshini Bhawanipur and Dumariya gram panchayats of Sangrampur CD Block; Dilawarpur, Rajpur, Darmaha, Raghunathpur, Medan Sirisiya and Pipra Khem gram panchayats of Kalyanpur CD Block.

Kesaria Assembly constituency is part of 3. Purvi Champaran (Lok Sabha constituency). It was earlier part of Motihari (Lok Sabha constituency).

== Members of the Legislative Assembly ==
Year	Name	Party
1952	Prabhawati Gupta	Indian National Congress
1957	Prabhawati Gupta	Indian National Congress
1962	Pitambar Singh	Communist Party of India
1967	Pitambar Singh	Communist Party of India
1969	Ezaj Hussain Khan	Indian National Congress
1972	Pitambar Singh	Communist Party of India
1977	Pitambar Singh	Communist Party of India
1980	Rai Hari Shankar Sharma	Janata Party (Secular)
1985	Rai Hari Shankar Sharma	Indian National Congress
1990	Yamuna Yadav	Communist Party of India
1995	Yamuna Yadav	Communist Party of India
2000	Obaidullah	Samata Party
2005	Obaidullah	Janata Dal (United)
2005	Rajesh Kumar Raushan	Rashtriya Janata Dal
2010	Sachindra Prasad Singh	Bharatiya Janata Party
2015	Rajesh Kushwaha	Rashtriya Janata Dal
2020	Shalini Mishra	Janata Dal (United)
2025	Shalini Mishra	Janata Dal (United)

== Election results ==
=== 2025 ===
2025 Bihar Legislative Assembly election: Kesaria
Party	Candidate	Votes	%	±%
JD(U)	Shalini Mishra	78,192	44.26	+17.67
VIP	Varun Vijay	61,852	35.01	
JSP	Naj Ahamad Khan	11,206	6.34	
Independent	Sunil Kumar	4,567	2.58	
Independent	Chandreshwar Mishra	4,342	2.46	
Janshakti Janta Dal	Vinod Kumar	3,313	1.88	
Independent	Ram Sharan Prasad Yadav	2,782	1.57	
AAP	Ram Adhar Rai	2,663	1.51	
Rashtriya Jansambhavna Party	Chutun Kumar	2,253	1.28	
Independent	Punam Devi	2,131	1.21	
NOTA	None of the above	3,382	1.91	+0.93
Majority		16,340	9.25	+3.15
Turnout		176,683	67.7	+11.2
JD(U) hold		Swing		

=== 2020 ===
2020 Bihar Legislative Assembly election: Kesaria
Party	Candidate	Votes	%	±%
JD(U)	Shalini Mishra	40,219	26.59	
RJD	sanstosh kushwaha	30,992	20.49	−27.06
LJP	Ram Sharan Prasad Yadav	18,904	12.5	
RLSP	Maheshwar Singh	18,576	12.28	
Independent	Dr. Rajesh Kumar	17,729	11.72	
JAP(L)	Rajanish Kumar Pathak	7,217	4.77	+3.31
Independent	Ravindra Kumar Berwar	3,635	2.4	
Independent	Amrendra Kumar Verma	2,555	1.69	
BSP	Abhay Kumar Singh	2,131	1.41	+0.05
Bahujan Nyay Dal	Ram Adhar Rai	2,020	1.34	
Independent	Rajesh Yadav	1,877	1.24	
NOTA	None of the above	1,483	0.98	−0.89
Majority		9,227	6.1	−5.96
Turnout		151,279	56.5	+1.57
JD(U) gain from RJD		Swing		

=== 2015 ===
2015 Bihar Legislative Assembly election: Kesaria constituency
Party	Candidate	Votes	%	±%
RJD	Rajesh Kumar	62,902	47.55	
BJP	Rajendra Prasad Gupta	46,955	35.49	
CPI	Ram Saran Prasad Yadav	11,767	8.89	
Independent	Neeta Sharma	2,617	1.98	
JAP(L)	Umesh Kumar Singh	1,938	1.46	
SP	Atique Ahmad Khan	1,838	1.39	
BSP	Awdhesh Kuwar	1,794	1.36	
NOTA	None of the above	2,479	1.87	
Majority		15,947	12.06	
Turnout		132,290	54.93	

=== 2010 ===
In the November 2010 state assembly elections, Sacchindra Prasad Singh of BJP won the 15 Kesaria assembly seat defeating his nearest rival Ramsharan Prasad Yadav of CPI. Contests in most years were multi cornered but only winners and runners are being mentioned. Rajesh Kumar Raushan of RJD defeated Razia Khatoon of JD(U) in October 2005. Obaidullah of JD(U) defeated Rajesh Kumar Raushan of RJD in February 2005. Obaidullah of SAP defeated Yamuna Yadav of KSP in 2000. Yamuna Yadav of CPI defeated Kiran Shukla of BPP in 1995 and Rai Hari Shankar Sharma of BJP in 1990. Rai Hari Shankar Sharma representing Congress defeated Yamuna Yadav of CPI in 1985. Rai Hari Shankar Sharma representing Janata Party (JP) defeated Laxman Singh of Congress in 1980. Pitambar Singh of CPI defeated Rai Hari Shankar Sharma of Janata Party in 1977.

=== 1967 ===
- P. Sinha (CPI): 15,933 votes
- M. Prasad (INC): 13544 votes
