= Manoj Kumar Yadav (Bihar politician) =

Indian politician

Member of the Bihar Legislative Assembly
- In office 2020–2025
- Preceded by: Sachindra Prasad Singh
- Succeeded by: Sachindra Prasad Singh
- Constituency: Kalyanpur

Personal details
- Party: Rashtriya Janata Dal
- Occupation: Politics

Manoj Kumar Yadav is an Indian politician from Bihar and a Member of the Bihar Legislative Assembly. Yadav won the Kalyanpur Assembly constituency on RJD ticket in the 2020 Bihar Legislative Assembly election.
