= Govindganj Assembly constituency =

Coordinates: 26°28′56″N 84°41′07″E

Govindganj
- Constituency No. 14 for the Bihar Legislative Assembly

Constituency details
- Country: India
- Region: East India
- State: Bihar
- Division: Tirhut
- District: East Champaran
- Lok Sabha constituency: Purvi Champaran
- Established: 1951
- Total electors: 264,744
- Reservation: None

Member of Legislative Assembly
- 18th Bihar Legislative Assembly
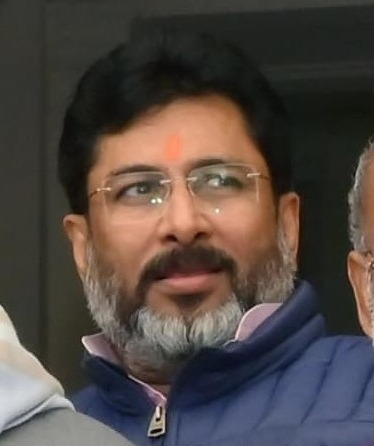
- Incumbent Raju Tiwari प्रदेश अध्यक्ष, लोजपा (राम विलास)
- Party: LJP(RV)
- Alliance: NDA
- Elected year: 2025
- Preceded by: Sunil Mani Tiwari, BJP

Govindganj Assembly constituency is an assembly constituency in Purvi Champaran district in the Indian state of Bihar.

== Overview ==
As per orders of Delimitation of Parliamentary and Assembly constituencies Order, 2008, 14. Govindganj Assembly constituency is composed of the following: Areraj and Paharpur community development blocks; and Paschimi Sangrampur, Purbi Sangrampur and Dakshani Bariyaria of Sangrampur CD Block. Brahmin voters have dominance in Govindganj Vidhan Sabha and its nearby areas, that is why MLAs from Brahmin caste have always been elected here, all the parties here mostly give tickets to Brahmin candidates for Brahmin votes.

Govindganj Assembly constituency is part of 3. Purvi Champaran (Lok Sabha constituency). It was earlier part of Motihari (Lok Sabha constituency).

== Members of the Legislative Assembly ==
Year	Name	Party
1952	Sheodhari Pandey	Indian National Congress
1957	Dhruv Narain Mani Tripathi	Indian National Congress
1962	Dhruv Narain Mani Tripathi	Indian National Congress
1967	Dhruv Narain Mani Tripathi	Indian National Congress
1969	Hari Shankar Sharma	Bharatiya Jana Sangh
1972	Rama Shankar Pandey	Indian National Congress
1977	Rama Shankar Pandey	Indian National Congress
1980	Rama Shankar Pandey	Indian National Congress (I)
1985	Yogendra Pandey	Independent
1990	Yogendra Pandey	Janata Dal
1995	Devendra Nath Dubey	Samata Party
1998^	Bhupendra Nath Dubey	Samata Party
2000	Rajan Tiwari	Independent
2005	Meena Dwivedi	Janata Dal (United)
2005	Meena Dwivedi	Janata Dal (United)
2010	Meena Dwivedi	Janata Dal (United)
2015	Raju Tiwari	Lok Janshakti Party
2020	Sunil Mani Tiwari	Bharatiya Janata Party
2025	Raju Tiwari	Lok Janshakti Party (Ram Vilas)

== Election results ==
=== 2025 ===
2025 Bihar Legislative Assembly election: Govindganj
Party	Candidate	Votes	%	±%
LJP(RV)	Raju Tiwari	96,034	52.55	
INC	Shashi B Rai	63,351	34.67	+9.77
JSP	Krishna Kant	9,830	5.38	
PP	Nitesh Kr	3,770	2.06	
JJD	Ashutosh	3,471	1.9	
BSP	Ajeet Ram	1,815	0.99	−1.15
NOTA	NOTA	2,911	1.59	−0.38
Majority		32,683	17.88	−0.36
Turnout		182,741	69.03	+12.08
LJP(RV) gain from BJP		Swing		

=== 2020 ===
Bihar Assembly election, 2020: Govindganj
Party	Candidate	Votes	%	±%
BJP	Sunil Mani Tiwari	65,716	43.14	
INC	Brajesh Kumar Pandey	37,936	24.9	−9.25
LJP	Raju Tiwari	31,461	20.65	−33.89
Independent	Sarvesh Kumar Tiwari	3,314	2.18	
BSP	Viswanath Prasad	3,267	2.14	+0.4
Independent	Ranjay Rai	1,990	1.31	
Independent	Vipin Kant Tiwari	1,626	1.07	
Yuva Krantikari Party	Pappu Giri	1,616	1.06	
Independent	Yuvraj Pandey	1,406	0.92	
NOTA	None of the above	3,007	1.97	−0.54
Majority		27,780	18.24	−2.15
Turnout		152,339	56.95	+0.61
BJP gain from LJP		Swing		

=== 2015 ===
2015 Bihar Legislative Assembly election: Govindganj
Party	Candidate	Votes	%	±%
LJP	Raju Tiwari	74,685	54.54	
INC	Brajesh Kumar	46,765	34.15	
SS	Ganeshwar Tiwari	3,058	2.23	
Independent	Pankaj Kumar	2,481	1.81	
BSP	Ravindra Dubey	2,376	1.74	
Independent	Vijay Kumar	2,092	1.53	
NOTA	None of the above	3,441	2.51	
Majority		27,920	20.39	
Turnout		136,927	56.34	
