= Bibhuti Mishra =

Indian politician

Pandit Bibhuti Mishra
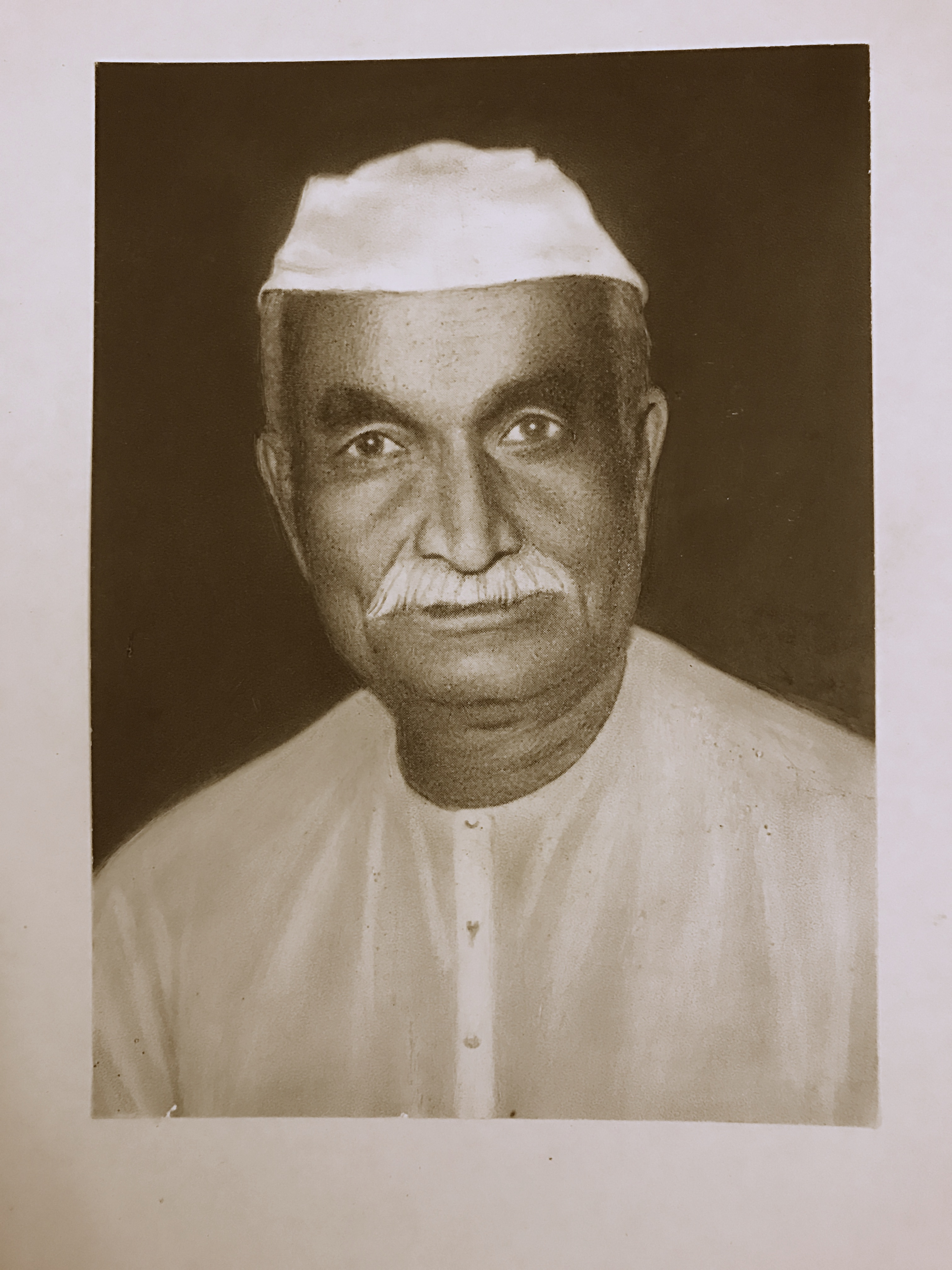
- Freedom Fighter, Social Worker

Member of Parliament, Lok Sabha
- In office 1952–1977
- Succeeded by: Thakur Ramapati Singh
- Constituency: Motihari, Bihar

Personal details
- Born: 1900 Mangurahan, British India
- Died: 4 April 1981 (aged 80–81) Motihari, Bihar
- Party: Indian National Congress
- Spouse: Anarkali Devi
- Children: 5

Bibhuti Mishra (1900 – 4 April 1981) was an Indian politician. He was elected to the Lok Sabha, lower house of the Parliament of India from Motihari, Bihar in 1952,1957,1962,1967 and 1971 as a member of the Indian National Congress. He was defeated in the 1977 elections and Thakur Ramapati Singh was elected.
