= Thakur Ramapati Singh =

Indian politician, Freedom Fighter

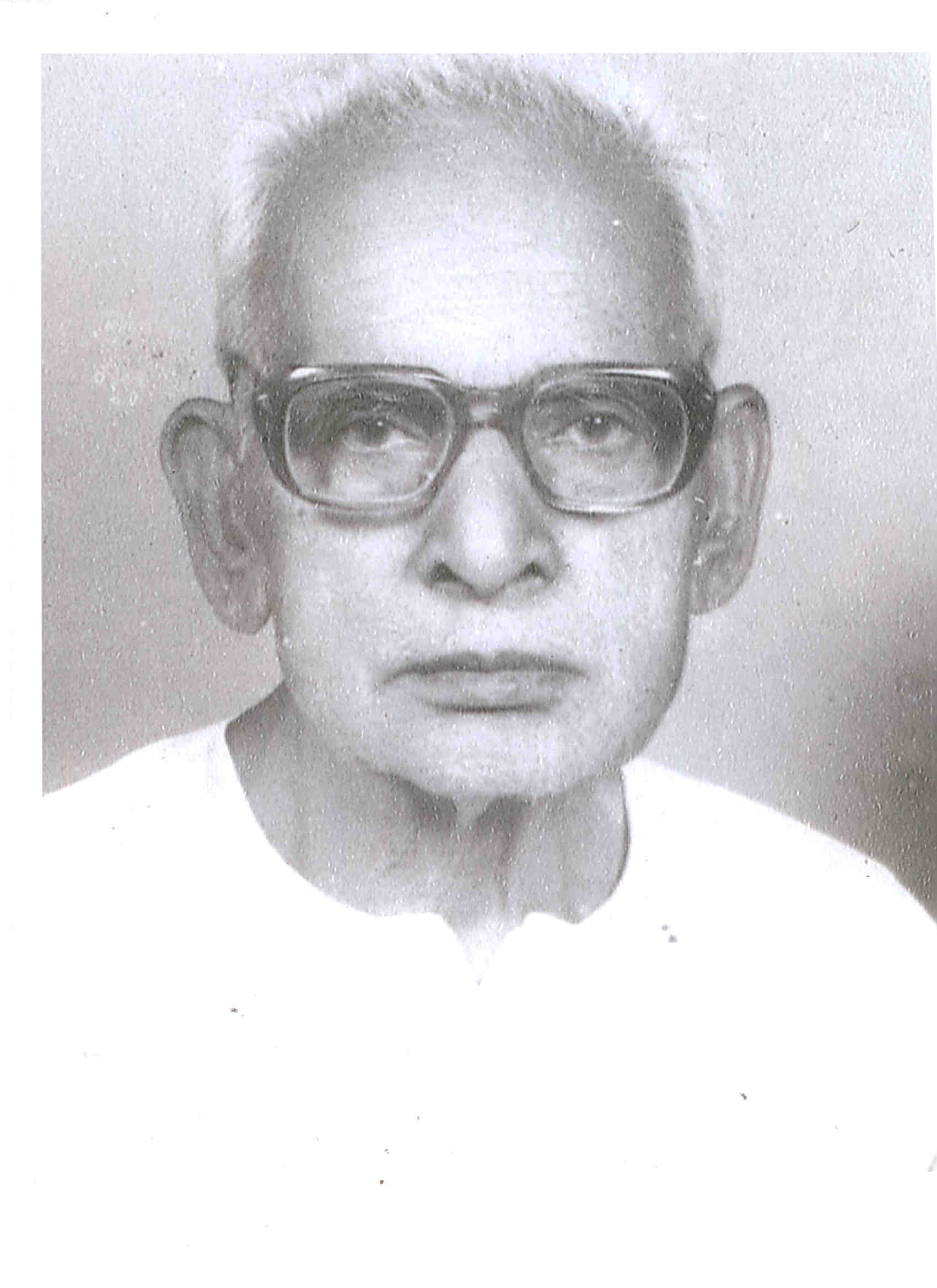

Member of parliament, Lok Sabha
- In office 6th Lok Sabha, 1977
- Constituency: Motihari Lok Sabha constituency

Personal details
- Born: 1912 Harnathpur, Bihar
- Died: 12 October 1999 (aged 86–87) Motihari, chandmari
- Party: Janata Party
- Spouse(s): Ratneshwari Devi ( dead - 2019, motihari, chandmari)

Thakur Ramapati Singh (1912 – 12 October 1999) (also known as Thakur Ramapati Sinha), was a freedom fighter, politician, MLA and Minister of Bihar, Member of Indian Parliament and a prominent social personality from Motihari, Bihar in India.

== Family ==
Thakur Ramapati Singh was the eldest son of Shri Ram Surat Singh the head of one of the wealthiest landlord family of the village of Harnathpur located in present day "Pakridayal Block" of East Champaran district of the State of Bihar in India. His family had thousands of acres of land in Motihari, Muzaffarpur, Bettiah, and in Delhi, and Haryana as well.

== Education ==
His school education was primarily at the district headquarters in Motihari. After school, he joined Patna Science College. The country was witnessing a raging struggle for Indian independence led by Mahatma Gandhi during this period and Thakur Ramapati Singh was soon in the midst of this movement leading the Youth Congress in Patna. He came in contact with the stalwarts of independence movement and eminent nationalists Rajendra Babu, Anugraha Babu and Shri Krishna Sinha.

== Post-Independence career ==
Singh was repeatedly imprisoned by the British government in India. After independence, he completed his law degree, worked briefly in a local law practice and then established his own.

== Politics ==
Affected by the state of local governance, Singh returned to politics by being elected as chairman of the municipal corporation of Motihari.

=== Bihar Legislative Assembly ===
He was then elected to the Bihar Legislative Assembly in 1960s and then for a second term in 1972. During these two consecutive terms in the state legislature he served as a minister and handled portfolios such as the education ministry and the ministry of industries. He was a member of the cabinet of then Chief Minister of Bihar, Mahamaya Prasad Sinha.

=== Dissidence during State of Emergency ===
In the 1970s during the “days of emergency”, Singh joined the struggle led by Jayaprakash Narayan and worked closely with his close colleague and Janata Party veteran Satyendra Narain Sinha also a prominent political leader of this movement he was repeatedly imprisoned as a political prisoner during the emergency imposed by then Prime Minister Indira Gandhi.

=== Member of Parliament ===
In the elections that followed the emergency, Singh was a candidate of the newly-formed Janata Party and contested and won from his home constituency of Motihari. He was a Member of Parliament of the 6th Lok Sabha of India from the Motihari constituency.

== Retirement from politics ==
After his stint in the Indian Parliament, he returned to his law practice. He spent the rest of his years in his home town of Motihari dedicating his efforts to socialism while out of public office.

He was in his later years, elected Chairman of the Bar Association of Motihari.

== Death ==
Thakur Ramapati Singh died on 12 October 1999 in his home in Chandmari, Motihari, and was cremated in the village of his ancestors.
