= Raju Tiwari =

Indian politician from Bihar

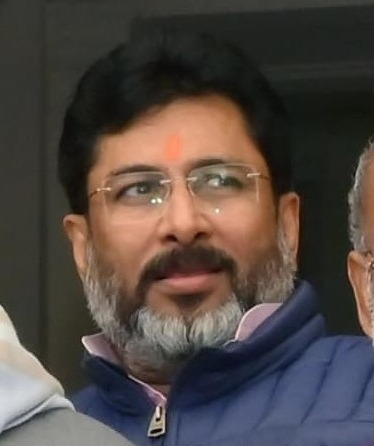

Member of Bihar Legislative Assembly
- Incumbent
- Assumed office 2025
- Preceded by: Sunil Mani Tiwari
- Constituency: Govindganj
- In office 2015–2020
- Preceded by: Meena Dwivedi
- Succeeded by: Sunil Mani Tiwari
- Constituency: Govindganj

State President of LJP (Ram Vilas), Bihar
- In office 05 October 2021 – 26 August 2026
- National President: Chirag Paswan
- Preceded by: Position established
- Succeeded by: Surender Vivek

Personal details
- Born: 5 July 1979 (age 47) Gorakhpur, Uttar Pradesh
- Party: Lok Janshakti Party (Ram Vilas)
- Other political affiliations: Lok Janshakti Party (till Oct 2021)
- Relations: Rajan Tiwari (brother)
- Occupation: Social work and business

Raju Tiwari (born 5 July 1979) is an Indian politician. He was the Bihar State President of Lok Janshakti Party (Ram Vilas) since June 2021 till August 2026. He was elected to the Bihar Legislative Assembly representing the Govindganj Assembly Constituency in 2015 Bihar Legislative Assembly election as a Member of the Lok Janshakti Party. He is brother of the Former Member of Bihar Legislator Rajan Tiwari.

== Early life and education ==
Raju Tiwari was born on July 5, 1979 to the Vishwajeewan Ram Tiwari and Kanti Devi in Gorakhpur, Uttar Pradesh.

He completed his Masters degree with Arts from Deen Dayal Upadhyay Gorakhpur University in year 1994.
