= Ismailpur =

- Village
- Location in Bihar, India
- Coordinates: 25°45′36″N 85°11′38″E
- Country: India
- State: Bihar
- District: vaishali

Population (2011)
  - Total: 6,630

Languages
  - Official: Hindi
- Time zone: UTC+5:30 (IST)
- ISO 3166 code: IN-BR

Ismailpur (Harauli) is a village in Vaishali district of Bihar state in India.

== Geography ==
Ismailpur village is located at 25°45′36″N 85°11′38″E

- Area of village (in hectares): 289 hectares

== Economy ==
- 288 (household) are below the poverty line
- The main source of income for the residents is farming. Here they cultivate mostly rice, watermelon, sunflower, banana, and mango.
- Most of the young people have or are migrating to cities for their earnings.
- 8% of the people are daily labourers.

== Administrative profile ==
- Administrative unit: Tirhut
- Division:
- District name: vaishali District (District Code 0516)
- Block name: Hajipur (Block Code 0516001)
- Panchayat name: Ismailpur (Panchayat Code 0516001003)
- Village name: Ismailpur (Village Code 01964900)

== Population ==
Number of households: 891

- Total population: 6330
- Male: 3367
- Female: 2963
- Below poverty line: 288 (Household)
- Total working population: 37.19%
- Working male population: 56.41%
- Working women population: 15.07%
- Marginal working population:10.6%
- Non-working population: 62.81%

== Literacy ==
- Total literate people: 3501 (Total literacy rate 55.32)
- Literate females: 1302 (Female literacy rate 43.94%)
- Literate males: 2195 (Male literacy rate 65.21%).

== Education ==
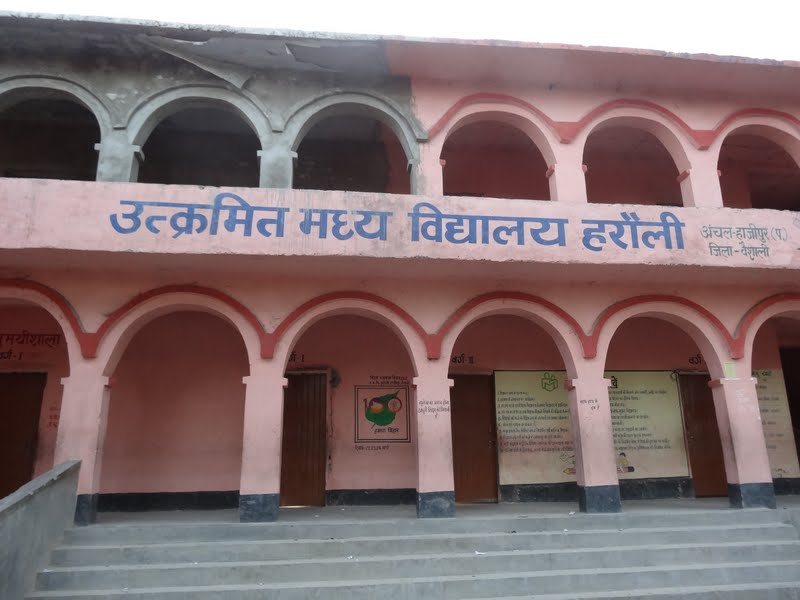
Utkramit Madhya Vidyalaya Ismailpur Harauli

- Two primary (government) schools are in the village. Other primary schools are Rajkiya Madhya Vidyalaya, Minapur Rai and Rajkiya Uchh Vidyalaya, Minapur Rai.

=== Colleges near Ismailpur ===
- Jamunilal College Hajipur (6.3 km from ismailpur )
- RN College Hajipur (11 km from ismailpur )

=== Colleges and KIDS CARE near Ismailpur ===
B.R.I.T.I Ismailpur B.R.KIDS CARE Ismailpur

== Temples ==
Budhi mai temple in ismailpur( harauli) video

Budhi Mai Temple is one of the most famous temples in Vaishali district and also in Bihar.

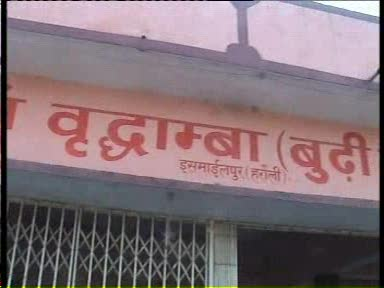
budhi mai temple photo

== Culture and cuisine ==
People of Ismailpur celebrate the following festivals:

- Makarsankranti
- Vasant Panchami or Saraswati Puja
- Maha Shivaratri
- Holi
- Ramanavami
- Akshaya Tritiya or Akhateej
- Buddha Purnima
- Teej
- Nag Panchami
- Raksha-Bandhan
- Krishna Janmashtami
- Ananta Chaturthi
- Vishwakarma Puja
- Dasara
- Dhanteras
- Diwali or Deepavali
- Chhat Puja
- Kartik Poornima

== Transportation ==
SH-74 BIHAR is a major state highway which links the village with Hajipur city, Lalganj town and Vaishali district

The village is 7 km from the Hajipur city, 19 km from the state capital of bihar patna and it is well connected with other major cities

Villagers can connect very easily to different cities or towns from Hajipur using local transport, Buses.

=== Public transportation ===
There are very frequent vehicles flowing in and out of the village:

- Regular Autos services 24×7 from the Hajipur and also morning and evening transport service available to the Lalganj Depot.
- Available many other private vehicles (such as buses, mini taxis, etc.) run by individuals.
- Local buses schedulability is also available to village from the Muzaffarpur city to lalganj route.
- Rail Way Station Hajipur Rail Way Station is the nearest railway station to the village.
- sonpur railway Station near to Hajipur is also another option for villagers and visitors.

== Notable places and locations ==
Near places of village:

=== Nearby cities ===
- Hajipur 7 km
- Sonepur 12 km
- Lalganj 13 km
- Patna (capital of bihar ) 28 km

=== Nearby airports ===
- Patna Airport 35 km near
- Gaya Airport 133 km near

=== Nearby districts ===
- Vaishali District 23 km
- Muzaffarpur district 59 km
- Saran district 52 km

=== Railway station ===
- Fatehpur Harauli Railway Station 3 km
- Hajipur Railway Station 7.4 km
- Sonepur railway station 11 km
- Parmanandpur Railway Station, (Saran) 19 km
- Patna railway station 27 km

=== Nearest villages ===
- Samashak
- Chandi
- Manua
- Astipur
- Sri Rampur

== Banking ==
- Dena bank

IFSC code: BKDN0911401. MICR code: NA

- State bank of India

IFSC Code: SBIN0009690.
