= Ram Narayan Sharma =

Indian politician

Ram Narayan Sharma / Ram Narain Sharma
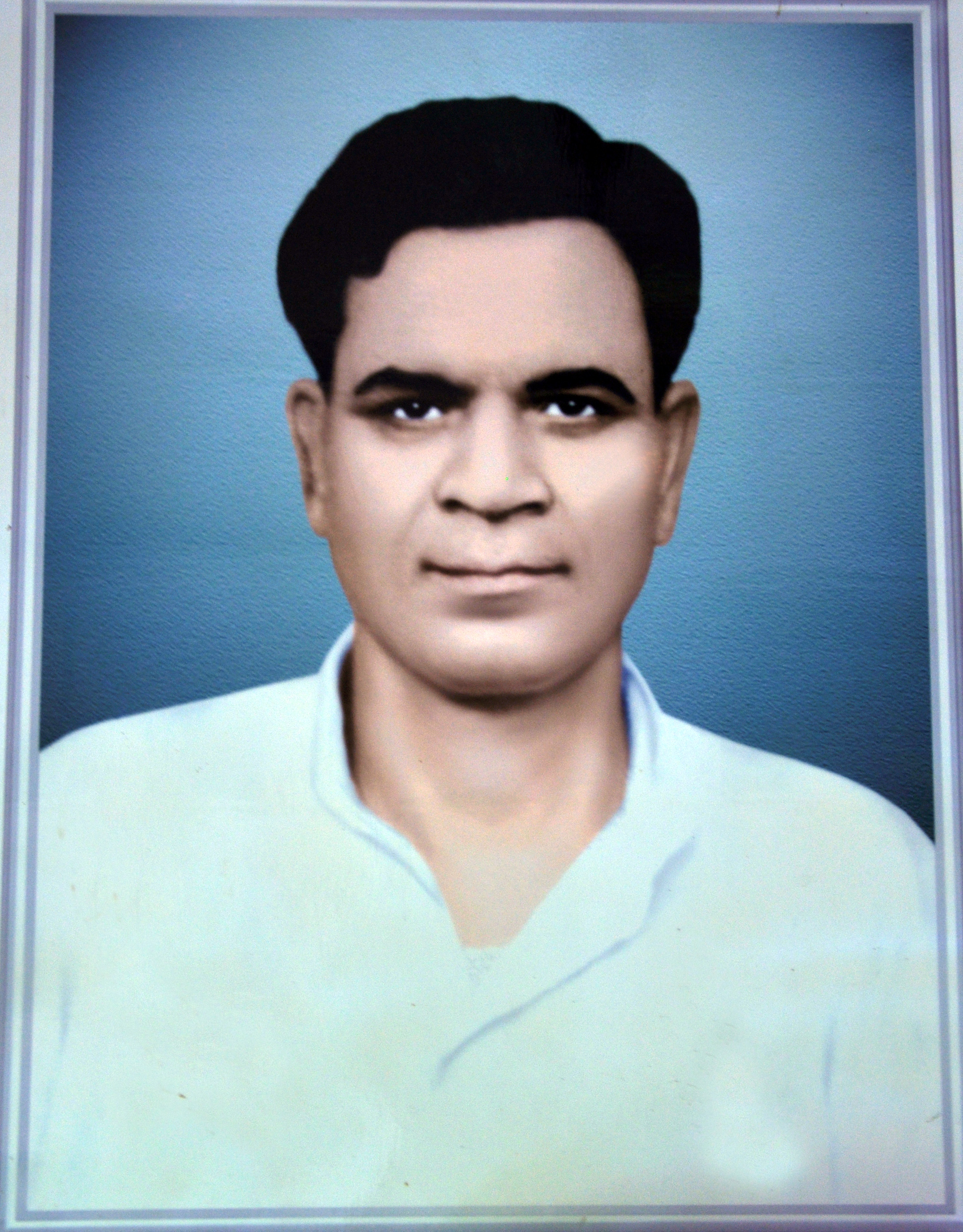
- Ram Narain Sharma
- Born: 31 August 1915
- Died: 11 April 1985 (aged 69)
- Occupations: Freedom fighter, trade union leader, political leader
- Office: Member of the 5th Lok Sabha

Ram Narayan Sharma /Ram Narain Sharma (31 August 1915 – 11 April 1985) was a freedom fighter from Dhanbad district, Jharkhand. His father’s name was Lt. Chandramauli Sharma and his wife's name was Sundar Pati Devi. He was born in Bhumihar family of Sarain-bux village, post office Garkha, district Saran, Bihar. He was born on 31 August 1915. He came to Dhanbad in 1938. He has sons namely Narendra Kumar Sharma, Ravindra Kumar Sharma, Devendra Sharma, and Jitendra Sharma, and daughters namely, Lt. Sushila Thakur, Urmila Sharma, and Lilawati Singh. He was MLA for five terms. He also worked for a trade union. He had participated in the 1942 Quit India Movement and due to this he was arrested and sent to jail for three years. He was released from jail on 30 August 1945. From 1941-to 45 he participated in individual satyagraha, satyagraha, and other mass movements and for these activities, he was in jail for three and half years. He was General Secretary, Dhanbad District Congress. He was a member of Bihar P.C.C., President of INTUC Working Committee, Bokaro Steel Workers’ Union, and Vice President. He attended the ILO Coal Committee meeting at Pitsburg in 1949, represented Indian Miners at International Miners Federation’s Annual Conference held in Stockholm in 1960, and also participated in Trade Union Seminar in Denmark in 1965. In 1971 he was elected as Lok Sabha Member. He was also involved in social activities such as being a member of the District Development Committee, Dhanbad and Governing Council of Sindri College, President of Gram Dan Pragati Samiti, Dhanbad, and was associated with the cooperative movement in the Dhanbad district. He was interested in volleyball, tennis, and swimming. He died on 11 April 1985.

He was an Indian National Congress politician and served as a member of the 5th Lok Sabha, representing Dhanbad in Jharkhand, India, between 1971 and 1977.

He also represented various constituencies of Dhanbad district in the Bihar Legislative Assembly:

- 1952 and 1957 he was returned for Tundi cum Nirsa;
- 1957 to 1962, he represented Nirsa;
- 1962 to 1967, he was elected for Jorapokhar
- 1967 to 1968 saw him representing Nirsa once more

== See also ==
- List of people from Bihar
