= Kesaria =

- Town
- Location in Bihar, India
- Coordinates: 26.334192°N 84.854820°E
- Country: India
- State: Bihar
- District: East Champaran

Government
  - Type: State Government
  - Body: Bihar
- Elevation: 45 m (148 ft)

Languages
  - Official: Hindi, Urdu, Bhojpuri
- Time zone: UTC+5:30 (IST)
- PIN: 845424

Kesaria, also known as Kesariya, is a town in the district of East Champaran, in the Indian state of Bihar. It is the site of a stupa built by the Mauryan king Ashoka. And Kesaria stupa is most conveniently approached by road from Darbhanga Airport via Muzaffarpur and Mehsi along National Highway 27 (NH 27). From Patna, the preferred road route is via Lalganj, Saraiya along National Highway 139W (NH 139W), before continuing to Kesariya via the connecting state road.

== Geography ==
Kesaria is near the River Gandak and Rampur Khajuria. The nearest villages are Noori Mohalla Trilokwa & Trilokwa (3.5 km), Kushar Saikh Toli (4 km), Phultakiya (3 km), Baisakhawa (2 km), Ramgadhwa (4 km), Tajpur (6 km), Bairiya (6 km), Bathana (5 km), Nyagaw (4 km). There are also two mosques and nearst city Mehsi about 27 km and Motihari about 45 km.

== Kesariya Stupa ==
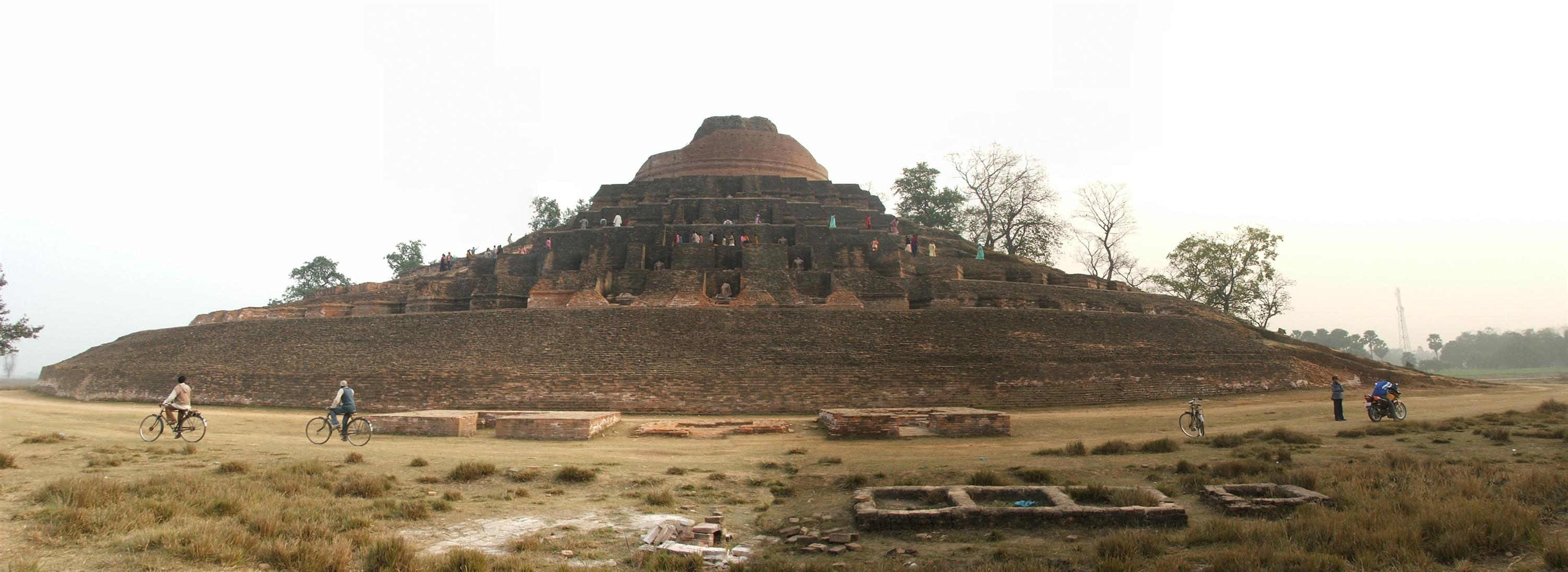
The Kesariya stupa.

Initially constructed as a mud stupa, it gained its present structure in the Maurya, Sunga and Kushana period. The stupa dates between 200 AD and 750 AD and may have been associated with the 4th-century ruler, Raja Chakravarti. Kesariya Stupa is 104 feet high.

The Chinese Buddhist pilgrim Xuanzang mentions having seen the grand Stupa in Kia-shi-po-lo (Kesariya) but it was deserted and overgrown.

The Kesariaa stupa was discovered in 1958 during an excavation led by Archaeologist K. K. Muhammed of Archaeological Survey of India (ASI).

== Climate ==
Climate data for Kesaria
Month	Jan	Feb	Mar	Apr	May	Jun	Jul	Aug	Sep	Oct	Nov	Dec	Year
Record high °C (°F)	23.1 (73.6)	25.7 (78.3)	31.9 (89.4)	35.3 (95.5)	37.5 (99.5)	35.2 (95.4)	32.6 (90.7)	32.1 (89.8)	32 (90)	31.5 (88.7)	28.4 (83.1)	24.5 (76.1)	37.5 (99.5)
Record low °C (°F)	9.5 (49.1)	11.1 (52.0)	16 (61)	21.1 (70.0)	24.9 (76.8)	26.1 (79.0)	25.7 (78.3)	26 (79)	25.4 (77.7)	21.7 (71.1)	14.4 (57.9)	10.2 (50.4)	9.5 (49.1)
