= Sachindra Prasad Singh =

Indian politician from Bihar

Member of Bihar Legislative Assembly
- Incumbent
- Assumed office 2025
- Preceded by: Manoj Kumar Yadav

Member of Bihar Legislative Assembly
- In office 2015–2020
- Preceded by: Razia Khatoon
- Succeeded by: Manoj Kumar Yadav
- Constituency: Kalyanpur
- In office 2010–2015
- Preceded by: Rajesh Kumar Raushan
- Succeeded by: Dr. Rajesh Kumar
- Constituency: Kesaria

Personal details
- Born: 5 January 1965 (age 61) Phulwaria, East Champaran
- Party: Bharatiya Janata Party
- Spouse: Abha Kiran
- Children: 2 sons, 2 daughters
- Education: M.A., LLB
- Occupation: Politician

Sachindra Prasad Singh is a member of the Bharatiya Janata Party from Bihar. He has won the Bihar Legislative Assembly election in 2010 from Kesaria and 2015 from Kalyanpur.
