= Prabhawati Gupta =

Indian politician (1928–2010)

Member of Parliament, Lok Sabha
- In office 1984–1989
- Preceded by: Kamla Mishra Madhukar
- Succeeded by: Radha Mohan Singh
- Constituency: Motihari, Bihar

Personal details
- Born: 2 February 1928 Allahabad, United Provinces, British India
- Died: 10 December 2010 (aged 82) Patna, Bihar, India
- Party: Indian National Congress
- Spouse: Rajendra Prasad
- Children: 2 Sons and 1 daughter

Prabhawati Gupta (2 February 1928 – 10 December 2010) was an Indian politician. She was elected to the Lok Sabha, lower house of the Parliament of India from Motihari, Bihar in 1984 as a member of the Indian National Congress.

Gupta died in Patna, Bihar on 10 December 2010, at the age of 82.
