= Gadai Sarai =

- Gram Panchayat
- Location in Bihar, India Gadai Sarai (India)
- Coordinates: 25°43′26.3″N 85°12′15.5″E
- Country: India
- State: Bihar
- District: Vaishali
- Assembly Constituency: Hajipur Assembly Constituency (AC.123)

Languages
  - Official: Hindi
- Time zone: UTC+5:30 (IST)
- ISO 3166 code: IN-BR

Gadai Sarai is a Gram panchayat in Hajipur, vaishali District, Bihar.

== Geography ==
This panchayat is located at 25°43′26.3″N 85°12′15.5″E

== panchayat office ==
Kisan Vivah bhawan Akilabad

== Nearest City/Town ==
Hajipur (Distance 5 km)

== Nearest major road highway or river ==
SH 74 (State highway 74)

== Villages in panchayat ==
There are villages in this panchayat

s.n	villages
1	Bakarpur
2	Bakarpur
3	Purwa
4	Chak Nayamat
5	Gadai Sarae
6	Chaknur
7	Moazampur
8	Madarpur
9	Khalaf Bag
10	Chak Aima
11	Akilabad
12	Akilabad Diara
13	Salempur Gandaki
14	Salempur
