= Kesaria stupa =

Mauryan era stupa in Bihar, India

Kesariya Stupa
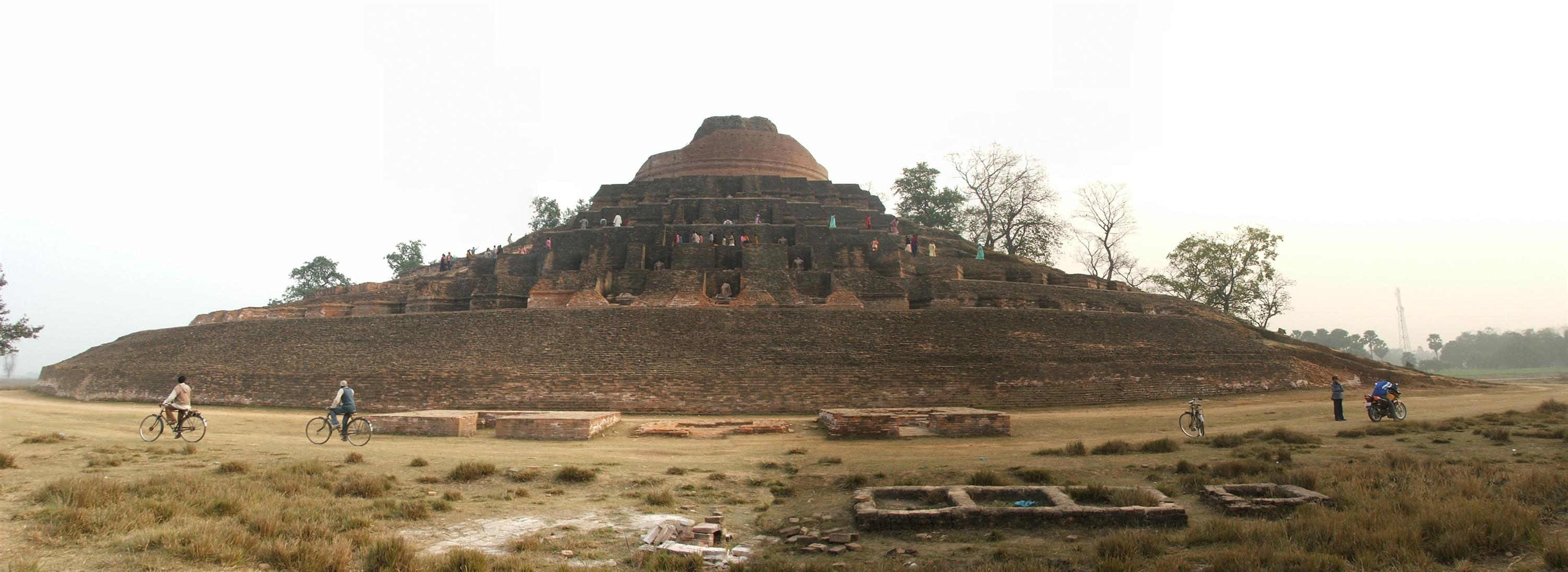
- Panorama of Kesariya Stupa

- Location in Bihar, India Kesaria stupa (Bihar)

Religion
- Affiliation: Buddhism
- Status: Preserved

Location
- Location: Kesaria, East Champaran district, Bihar, India
- Administration: Archaeological Survey of India
- Coordinates: 26.334140°N 84.854762°E

Architecture
- Type: Stupa
- Style: Buddhist

Specifications
- Height (max): 32 metres (105 feet)
- Materials: brick

Kesariya Stupa is a Buddhist stupa in Kesariya, near the town of Mehsi, located at a distance of 110 kilometres (68 mi) from Patna, in the East Champaran district of Bihar, India. Construction of the stupa at this site began in the 3rd century BCE. Kesariya Stupa has a circumference of almost 400 feet (120 m) and a height of about 104 feet (32 m).

== History ==
The site's exploration began in the 19th century, from its discovery by Colin Mackenzie in 1814 to Alexander Cunningham’s proper excavation in 1861–62. An excavation was conducted by archaeologist K. K. Muhammed of the Archaeological Survey of India (ASI) in 1998. The original Kesariya stupa probably dates to the time of Ashoka (circa 250 BCE), as the remains of a capital of a Pillar of Ashoka were discovered there.

The stupa may even have been inaugurated earlier, as it corresponds in many respects to the description of the stupa erected by the Licchavis of Vaishali shortly after the death of the Buddha to house the alms bowl he gave them. The current structure dates to the Pala period. The ASI has declared the stupa a protected monument of national importance. Despite being a popular tourist attraction, Kesariya has yet to be developed and a large part of the stupa remains under vegetation.

== Relationship with Borobodur ==
It has been noted that the Kesariya stupa shares many architectural similarities with the Buddhist temple located in Indonesia, Borobodur which hints at the travel of ritualistic texts and ideas between the Pala and Srivijaya domains. Both monuments share a circular mandala form with terraces containing figures of Buddha in the niches. Like Borobodur, Kesariya is also built atop of a hill. The excavated chambers at Kesariya show a combination of statues in bhumisparsha (of Akshobhya) and dhyanimudra (of Amitabha) on the same side, whereas Borobudur houses four Jina Buddhas, displaying their respective mudras on the four sides of the monument.

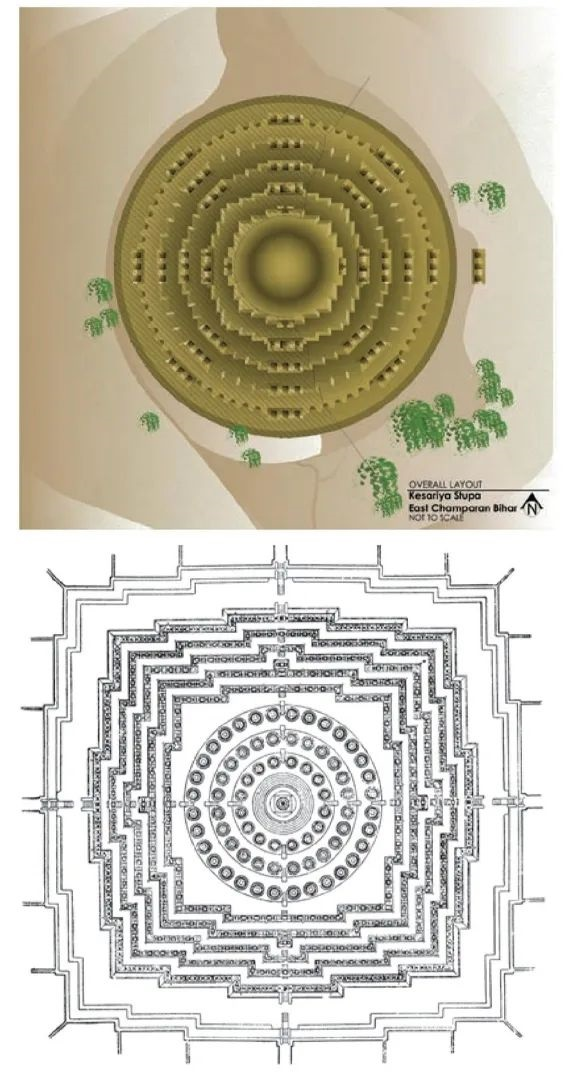
Similarities between the Borobudur site and Kesaria site design

In addition, a large stone slab that is black in colour was also discovered at Kesaria. This contained a script from the 10th-12th known as Siddhamātṛkā that was used in Java.

Both sites use a combination of square and circular terraces, although Kesaria is dominated by more circular forms. Both sites do not have their tops visible from the ground level, follow numerological patterns, and have roughly the same dimensions as well.

== Gallery ==
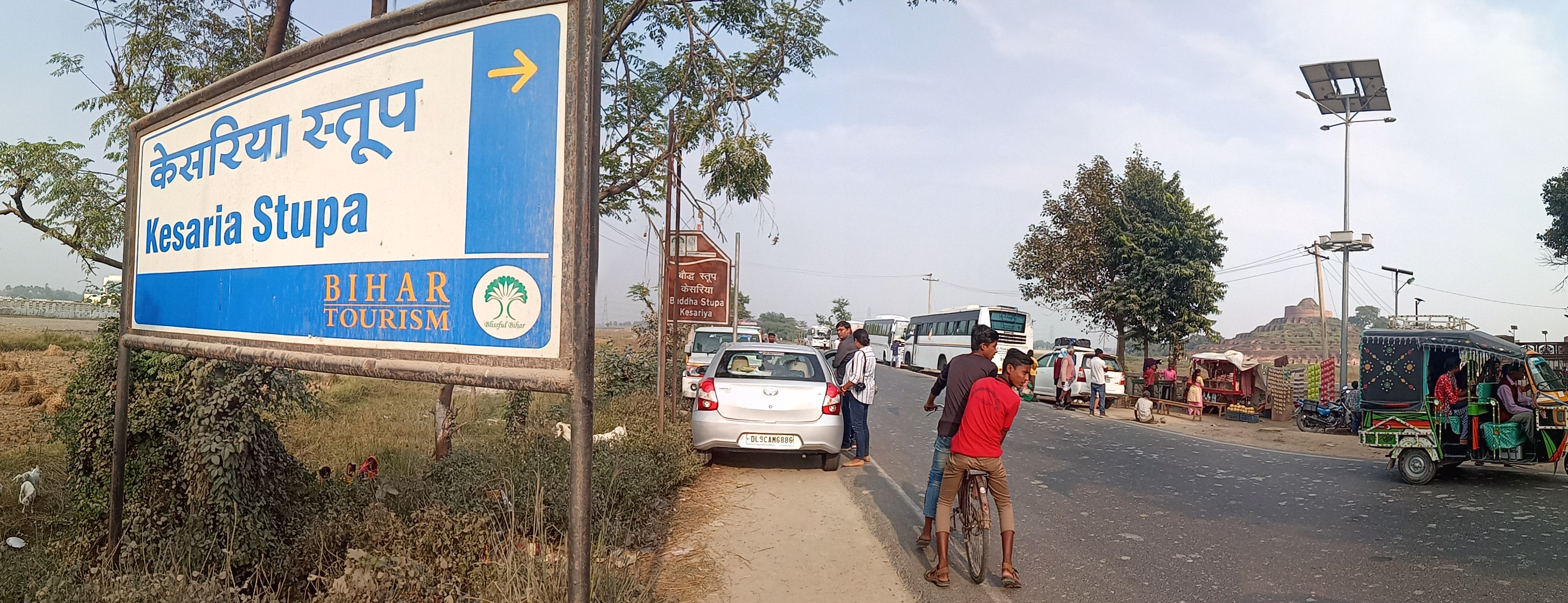
Chakia Kesariya Sattarghat Road, just outside the gate to the stupa

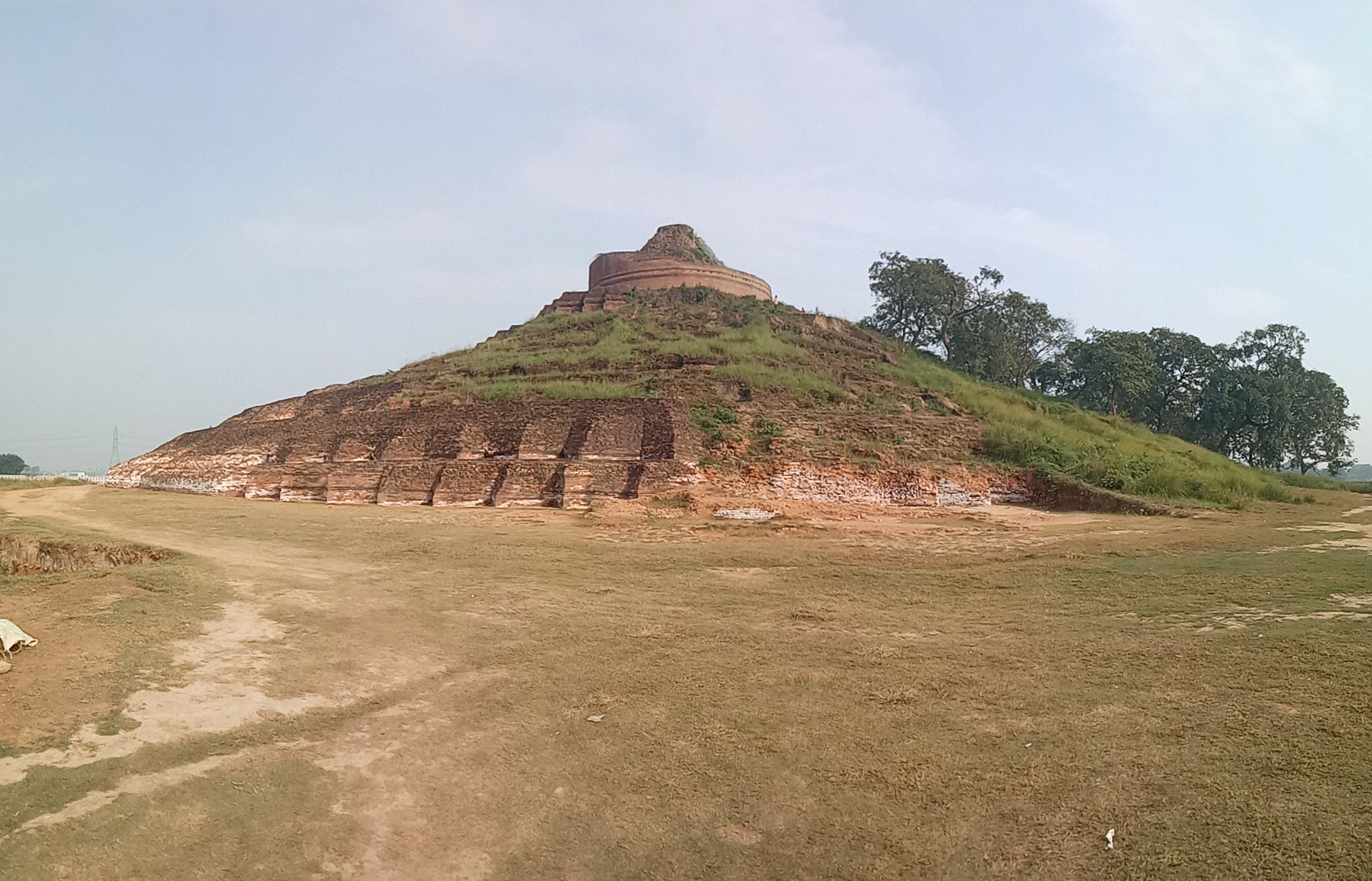
view of the stupa from the gate

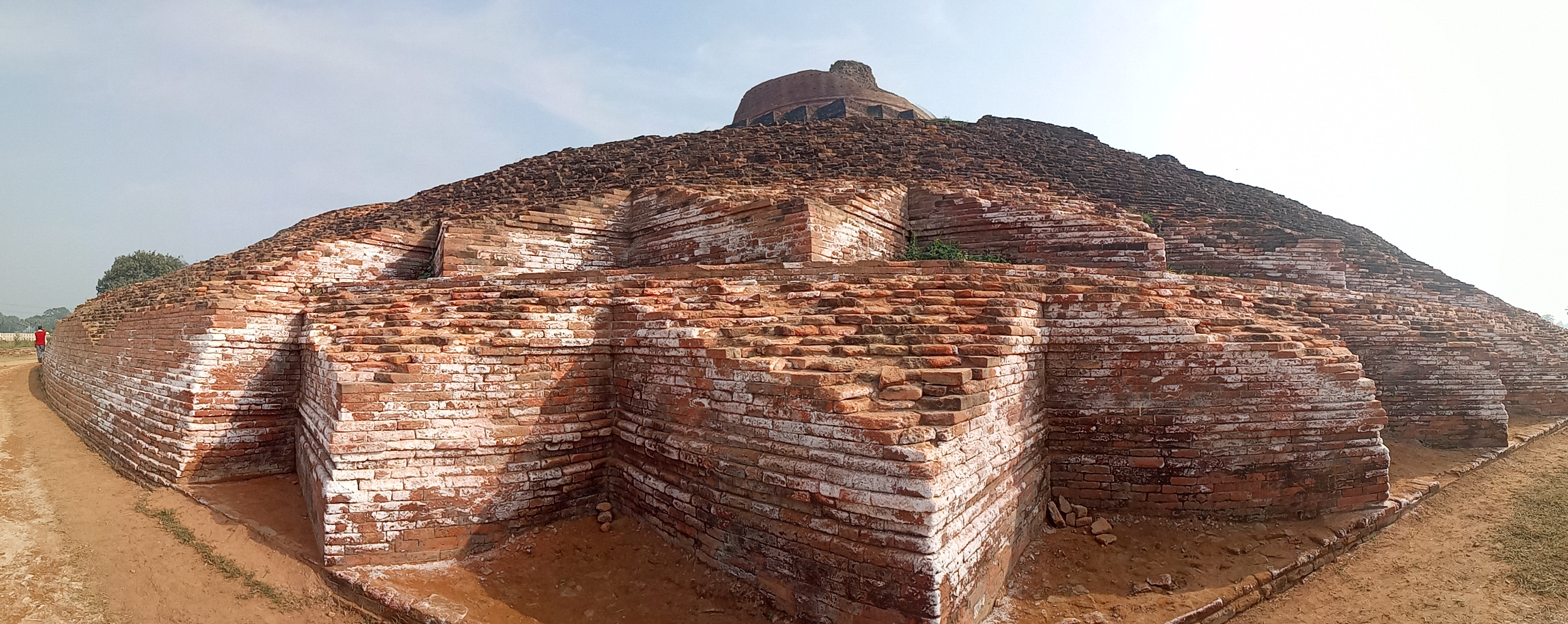
Panoramic close-up view of the stupa

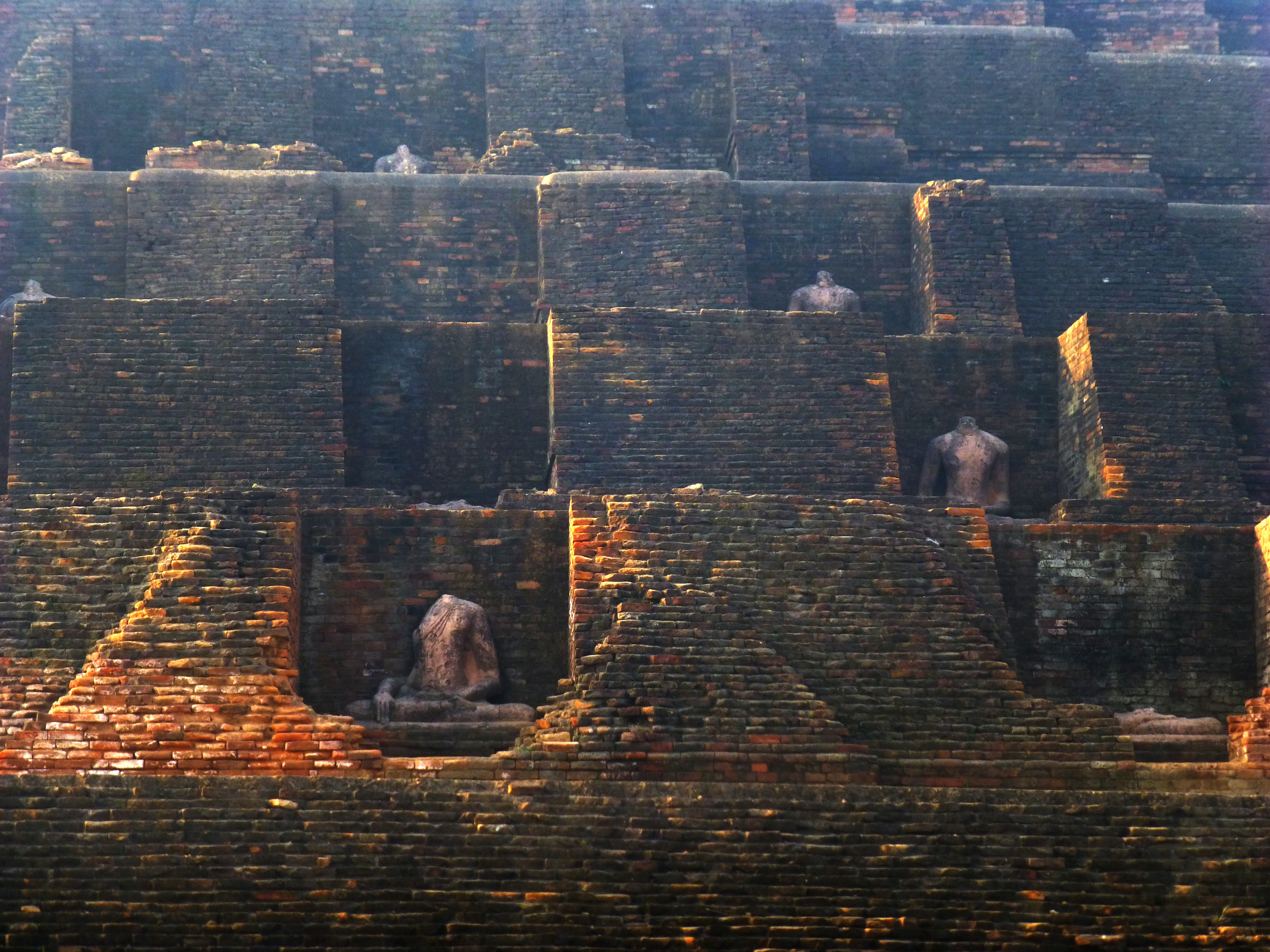
broken Buddha statues

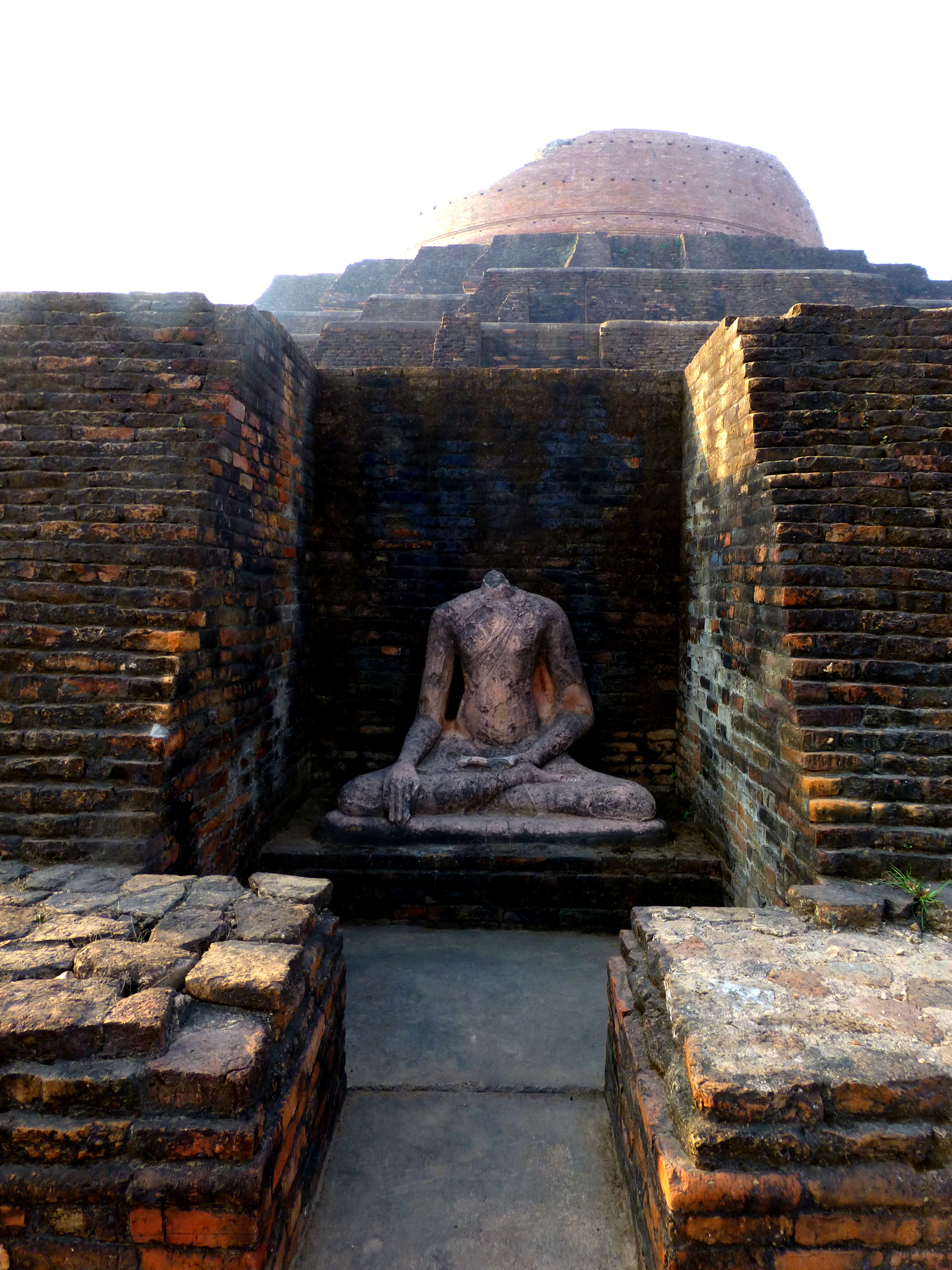
broken Buddha statue

== See also ==
- Dhamek Stupa
- Chaukhandi Stupa
- Sarnath
- List of Buddhist temples
