= Shalini Mishra =

Indian politician

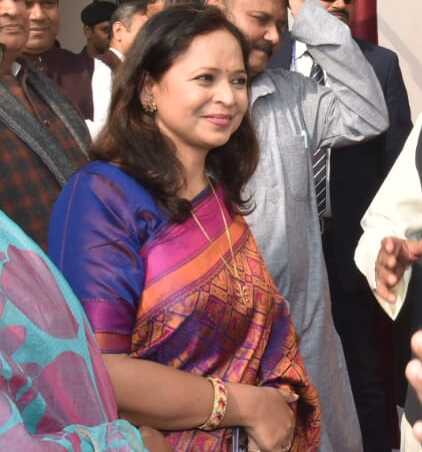

Member of Bihar Legislative Assembly
- Incumbent
- Assumed office 2020
- Preceded by: Rajesh Kumar
- Constituency: Kesaria Constituency

Personal details
- Born: 22 November 1973 (age 52) Pusa, Samastipur, Bihar
- Party: Janata Dal (United)
- Occupation: Politics

Shalini Mishra is an Indian politician from Bihar and a Member of the Bihar Legislative Assembly. Mishra won the Kesaria Constituency on the Janata Dal (United) ticket in the 2020 Bihar Legislative Assembly election. She is also the State General Secretary of Janata Dal (United) Bihar unit.

== Biography ==
- Age - 48 (2021)
- Education - Post Graduate
- Husband Name- Mr. Puneet Kumar
- Parents - Father-- Late Kamla Mishra Madhukar, Ex- MP (East Champaran)
- Mother- Late Kamna Mishra
