= Kamla Mishra Madhukar =

Indian politician

Kamla Mishra Madhukar (born in Village Madan Sirsiya, East Champaran district (Bihar)) was leader of CPI and was elected Member of Parliament four times from East Champaran. His last term as MP was in 1991-1996 during Narasimha Rao government. He was elected in 1980, 1967, 1971 and 1991.

== Career ==
Madhukar was first elected in the 1967 Indian general election in Bihar from the Kesaria Lok Sabha constituency representing the Communist Party of India. He retained the seat for the CPI in the 1971 Indian General Election in Bihar. He then contested from the Motihari Lok Sabha constituency and won in the 1980 Indian general election in Bihar. He became a four time parliamentarian winning the 1991 Indian general election in Bihar.
