= Motihari Lok Sabha constituency =

Former Lok Sabha constituency in Bihar, India

Coordinates: 26.6°N 84.9°E

Motihari
- Former Lok Sabha constituency

Constituency details
- Country: India
- Region: East India
- State: Bihar
- Established: 1952
- Abolished: 2008

Motihari was one of the 40 Lok Sabha constituencies in the Indian state of Bihar till 2008.

== Assembly segments ==
Motihari Lok Sabha constituency comprised the following Vidhan Sabha (legislative assembly) segments:

Constituency number	Name	Reserved for (SC/ST/None)	District
12	Motihari	None	East Champaran
16	Madhuban	None	East Champaran
17	Pipra	SC	East Champaran
18	Kesariya	None	East Champaran
19	Harsidhi	None	East Champaran
20	Gobindganj	None	East Champaran

== Members of Parliament ==
Year	Name	Party
1952	Bibhuti Mishra	Indian National Congress
1957	Bibhuti Mishra	Indian National Congress
1962	Bibhuti Mishra	Indian National Congress
1967	Bibhuti Mishra	Indian National Congress
1971	Bibhuti Mishra	Indian National Congress
1977	Thakur Ramapati Singh	Janata Party
1980	Kamla Mishra Madhukar	Communist Party of India
1984	Prabhawati Gupta	Indian National Congress
1989	Radha Mohan Singh	Bharatiya Janata Party
1991	Kamla Mishra Madhukar	Communist Party of India
1996	Radha Mohan Singh	Bharatiya Janata Party
1998	Rama Devi	Rashtriya Janata Dal
1999	Radha Mohan Singh	Bharatiya Janata Party
2004	Akhilesh Prasad Singh	Rashtriya Janata Dal
2008 onwards : See Purvi Champaran

== See also ==
- East Champaran district
- List of constituencies of the Lok Sabha
