= Lalganj, Bihar =

Lalganj
- Town
- Location in Bihar, India
- Coordinates: 25.87°N 85.18°E
- Country: India
- State: Bihar
- District: Vaishali
- Elevation: 42 m (138 ft)

Languages
  - Official: Vajjika, Hindi
- Time zone: UTC+5:30 (IST)
- PIN: 844121
- ISO 3166 code: IN-BR
- Lok Sabha constituency: Hajipur
- Vidhan Sabha constituency: Lalganj
- Website: http://nagarpanchayatlalganj.in
- It is a municipality since 1869 in Vaishali district in the Indian state of Bihar.

Lalganj is an important town and Nearest City (40 kilometres from the capital of Bihar, Patna), (60 kilometres from Morden Old City Mehsi), (37.6Kilometres from North Bihar Headquarter Muzaffarpur) and river port situated in Vaishali district, Bihar.

== History ==
It is part of Tirhut district and in 1869 the Lalganj Nagar Board was formed, at that time it was the 2nd place of Bihar in which there were 11 Commissioners and Hajipur and Sitamarhi. It lost 3 sq miles area during 1951 Census. Lalganj Municipality had 4 wards till 1972, 1981: 12 wards, 14 wards:2001 and 19 wards: 2011. Sharda Sadan Pushtakalya is one of the biggest libraries in Bihar.

== Education ==
- G.A High School (este.1932)
- Bhagwan Shankar High School (este.1972)
- Guru Nanak Kanya High School (este.1983)
- Awadh Bihari Singh Mahavidyalay

== Notable Personalities ==
- Rameshwar Prasad Sinha, freedom fighter, member of the Constituent Assembly
- Shiv Nandan Singh, Freedom fighter, called mahatma ji . Awarded by prime minister Indra Gandhi. He was a social reformer.
- Chandreshwar Prasad Singh, freedom fighter and social worker

== About ==
Lalganj is a Nagar Panchayat city in the district of Vaishali, Bihar. It is well connected to Hajipur, Patna, Sarai, Muzaffarpur, and Bhagwanpur. The Lalganj city is divided into 24 wards for which elections are held every 5 years. The Lalganj Nagar Nigam has a population of 37,098 of which 19,671 are males while 17,427 are females as per report released by Census India 2011.

The population of children aged 0–6 is 5749 which is 15.50% of total population of Lalganj (NP). In Lalganj Nagar Panchayat, the female sex ratio is 886 against state average of 918. Moreover, the child sex ratio in Lalganj is around 916 compared to Bihar state average of 935. The literacy rate of Lalganj city is 71.91% higher than the state average of 61.80%. In Lalganj, male literacy is around 78.19% while the female literacy rate is 64.78%.

Lalganj Nagar Nigam has total administration over 6,339 houses to which it supplies basic amenities like water and sewerage. It is also authorized to build roads within Nagar Nigam limits and impose taxes on properties coming under its jurisdiction.

Key Popular tourist places near to lalganj - Ashoka pillar, Buddha stupa or vishwa shanti stupa, Mahavir birth place, Vaishali garh, Vaishali lake, Raja Vishal fort and many other temples

Lalganj has all the key public and private sector banks, malls, shopping complex, modern schools and basic hospitals with numbers of doctor clinics. It is one of the growing nagar panchayat in bihar due to its agriculture income and hard working people throughout India and the world.

Due to its fertile land all the key major crops like wheat, maze, rice, tobacco, vegetables and moong are grown.

== Geography ==
Lalganj is located at 25.87°N 85.18°E. It has an average elevation of 42 metres (137 feet). One of the famous temples in the city is 'Suryana Mandir' which is located in the middle of the city. Lalganj is a growing town of the vaishali district of Indian state of Bihar. It is 20 km far from Hajipur in north direction. This town is located on the bank of Narayani river (Gandak River). Lalganj is 40 km far from the capital of bihar. The state highway 74 is going through Lalganj.

== Demographics ==
As of 2001 India census, Lalganj (Hindi: लाल गंज, Urdu: لال گنج, Persia:لالگانج) is a town and a nagar panchayat with 61 village panchayats in the Vaishali district of the Indian state of Bihar. It is Located on The bank of Narayani River(Gandak River).
