= Dhaka, East Champaran =

Dhaka
- Town
- Location in Bihar, India
- Coordinates: 26.68°N 85.17°E
- Country: India
- State: Bihar
- District: Purvi Champaran

Government
  - Type: Nagar Parishad
  - Body: Nagar Parishad house of Dhaka
- Elevation: 55 m (180 ft)

Population (2001)
  - Total: 45,897

Languages
  - Official: Hindi, Urdu
  - Regional/Spoken: Bhojpuri
- Time zone: UTC+5:30 (IST)
- PIN: 845418
- Vehicle registration: BR05
- Lok Sabha constituency: Sheohar
- Vidhan Sabha constituency: Dhaka
- Website: eastchamparan.bih.nic.in

Dhaka is a town and Nagar Parishad in East Champaran district of Bihar, India. It serves as the headquarters of the Sikrahana subdivision and has emerged as an important administrative, commercial and educational centre in northern East Champaran. The town is connected to the district's transport network through Mehsi, which is historically regarded as the Gateway of Champaran and functions as a major transport and trade centre linking the southern part of the district with northern border towns, including Dhaka. Together, Mehsi and Dhaka serve as two important regional centres supporting commerce, transport and public services in different parts of East Champaran.

== Geography ==
Dhaka is located at 26.68°N 85.17°E. It has an average elevation of 55 metres (180 feet). Its boundaries touch Nepal, Sitamari, and Sheohar.

It is 43 km from Gateway of Champaran (Mehsi), 59 km from Raxaul and 28 km from Motihari.

Religion in Dhaka, Bihar (2011)
1. Islam (62.7%)
2. Hinduism (37.1%)
3. Others (0.22%)

== Political history ==
Dhaka is famous for leaders like Avaneesh Kumar Singh. Born in an educated family, his father Late Shri Vindhyachal Singh was a noted scholar. Vindhyachal Singh served as Deputy District Magistrate and District Welfare officer of Chaibasa and Dumka respectively of then Bihar and now Jharkhand. Avaneesh Kumar Singh emerged as a Hindu face and he brought The Bhartiya Janta Party on grounds in the late 1990s. With a record margin of 1.5 lakh votes he won the first election and later served 4 times from the same constituency and one time from Chiraia Constituency as Member of Legislative Assembly (MLA). Motiur Rahman, who was MLA during early 1990s, and became Rajya Sabha MP in 2004. He died in 2007. Apart from him, many politicians such as Anwarul Haque, Nek Mohammad, Pawan Jaiswal, Faisal Rahman are from this area. Pawan Jaisawal was MLA of Dhaka from 2010-2015. Faisal Rahman served as MLA from 2015-2020. The current MLA is Pawan Jaisawal, from Bhartiya Janta Party.

Faisal Rahman is the son of Member of Parliament Motiur Rahman. During his tenure as a Member of the Legislative Assembly, Pawan Jaiswal initiated a mass marriage program, facilitating 75 marriages in the first year, 101 in the second, and 125 in the third.

Shri Vishwanath Singh and Shri Namdev Prasad Shrivastava from the nearby village Ruphara were eminent freedom fighters and were prominent in Gandhi's Champaran Satyagraha and Quit India Movement.

Siyaram Thakur another prominent leader and a freedom fighter who went to jail during British time . He was MLA and minister from janta party government during the period of 1977-1979. He worked as a political leader and for the welfare of the people of his constituency.
