= Rajepur Nawada =

- Village
- Nickname: RPR
- Location in Bihar, India
- Coordinates: 26°30′32.6″N 85°07′33.4″E
- Country: India
- State: Bihar
- Village: Purvi Champaran
- Founder: Government

Government
  - Type: Democracy
  - Body: Democratic

Population (2011)
  - Total: 8,864

Languages
  - Official: Bhojpuri, Hindi, English
- Time zone: UTC+5:30 (IST)
- PIN: 845414
- Telephone code: 06252
- Vehicle registration: BR-05
- Lok Sabha constituency: Sheohar

Rajepur Nawada is a village in the East Champaran District of Bihar.

== Geography ==
Rajepur Nawad is around 160 kilometres (99 mi) northwest of Patna, the capital of Bihar, 25 km (16 mi) from Motihari, and 80 km (50 mi) from Muzaffarpur. The city is close to Pakaridayal and is 15 km away, and Madhuban is 8 km away. The closest villages are Shekhpurva, Bokane Kala, Majhaulia, and Tharbetiya. The river Chaknaha flows nearby.

== Climate ==
Climate is characterized by high temperatures and evenly distributed precipitation throughout the year. The Köppen Climate Classification sub-type for this climate is "Cfa" (Humid Subtropical Climate).

Climate data for Rajepur Nawada
Month	Jan	Feb	Mar	Apr	May	Jun	Jul	Aug	Sep	Oct	Nov	Dec	Year
Mean daily maximum °C (°F)	22 (72)	—	—	—	—	—	—	—	—	—	—	—	—

== Demographics ==
As of 2011 India census, The Rajepur Nawada village has population of 8,854 of which 4,722 are males while 4,132 are females.

In Rajepur Nawada village population of children with age 0-6 is 1,795 which makes up 20.27% of total population of village. Average Sex Ratio of Rajepur Nawada village is 875 which is lower than Bihar state average of 918. Child Sex Ratio for the Rajepur Nawada as per census is 906, lower than Bihar average of 935.

Rajepur Nawada village has lower literacy rate compared to Bihar. In 2011, literacy rate of Rajepur Nawada village was 52.84% compared to 61.80% of Bihar. In Rajepur Nawada Male literacy stands at 60.98% while female literacy rate was 43.46%

== Roadways ==
Rajepur Nawada is connected with Muzaffarpur, Motihari, and Kathmandu by National Highway 28 via Motihari. Bus services are available to Muzaffarpur, Motihari.

== Education ==
Rajepur Nawada has many educational institutes including the following;

=== Government Institute ===
- R.M.V. and High School Rajepur Nawada, Nawada chowk
- Kanya Vidhayalaya, Near Panchayat Bhavan
- Primary School, Vishana Dai
- Primary School, Shivalay

=== Public Institution ===
- Nawada Central School
