= Md Anwarul Haque (Indian politician) =

Indian politician

Member of the Thirteenth Lok Sabha
- In office 1999–2004
- Preceded by: Anand Mohan Singh
- Succeeded by: Sitaram Singh
- Constituency: Sheohar

Personal details
- Born: 10 February 1948 Garahia, Sheohar district, Bihar
- Died: 12 August 2016 (aged 68)
- Party: Rashtriya Janata Dal
- Other political affiliations: Rashtriya Janata Dal (Democratic); Bharatiya Janata Party
- Spouse: Noorun Nisa (m. 1965)
- Parent(s): Abdul Aziz (father); Sabra Khatoon (mother)
- Education: Fazil
- Alma mater: Madrasa Islamia Shamsul Hoda

Md Anwarul Haque (10 February 1948 – 12 August 2016) was an Indian politician who served as a Member of the Thirteenth Lok Sabha from Sheohar Lok Sabha constituency, representing the Rashtriya Janata Dal, later switching to Rashtriya Janata Dal (Democratic). He was Member of the Bihar Legislative Assembly from the Sonbarsa representing the Indian National Congress (I) in 1980.

He joined the Bharatiya Janata Party in 2004 and partook in the 2004 Parliamentary elections, but didn't manage to win. He left BJP in same year after the election.
