= Sheohar Lok Sabha constituency =

Lok Sabha Constituency in Bihar, India

Coordinates: 26.5°N 85.29°E

Sheohar
- Lok Sabha constituency

Constituency details
- Country: India
- Region: East India
- State: Bihar
- Established: 1977
- Reservation: None

Member of Parliament
- 18th Lok Sabha
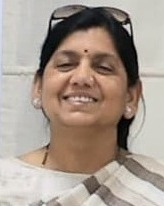
- Incumbent Lovely Anand
- Party: JD(U)
- Alliance: NDA
- Elected year: 2024
- Preceded by: Rama Devi (BJP)

Sheohar Lok Sabha constituency is one of the 40 Lok Sabha (parliamentary) constituencies in the Indian state of Bihar. This constituency has been represented by veterans like Thakur Jugal Kishore Sinha a freedom fighter and is known as the father of Cooperative Movement in India and Ram Dulari Sinha, former Union Minister and Governor. Their son Dr. Madhurendra Kumar Singh has also contested from Congress in 1989 General Election.

== Assembly segments ==
Presently, Sheohar Lok Sabha constituency comprises the following six Vidhan Sabha (legislative assembly) segments:

#	Name	District	Member	Party	2024 lead
18	Madhuban	East Champaran	Rana Randhir	BJP	JD(U)
20	Chiraia	East Champaran	Lal Babu Prasad Gupta	BJP	JD(U)
21	Dhaka	East Champaran	Faisal Rahman	RJD	RJD
22	Sheohar	Sheohar	Shweta Gupta	JD(U)	JD(U)
23	Riga	Sitamarhi	Baidyanath Prasad	BJP	JD(U)
30	Belsand	Sitamarhi	Amit Kumar Singh	LJP(RV)	JD(U)

== Members of Parliament ==
Year	Name	Party
1977	Thakur Girjanandan Singh	Janata Party
1980	Ram Dulari Sinha	Indian National Congress
1984	Ram Dulari Sinha	Indian National Congress
1989	Hari Kishore Singh	Indian People's Front
1991	Hari Kishore Singh	Janata Dal
1996	Anand Mohan Singh	Samata Party
1998	Anand Mohan Singh	All India Rashtriya Janata Party
1999	Md Anwarul Haque	Rashtriya Janata Dal
2004	Sitaram Singh	Rashtriya Janata Dal
2009	Rama Devi	Bharatiya Janata Party
2014	Rama Devi	Bharatiya Janata Party
2019	Rama Devi	Bharatiya Janata Party
2024	Lovely Anand	Janata Dal (United)

== Election results ==
=== 2024 ===
2024 Indian general elections: Sheohar
Party	Candidate	Votes	%	±%
JD(U)	Lovely Anand	476,612	45.15	
RJD	Ritu Jaiswal	4,47,469	42.39	
Independent	Akhileshwar Shrivaishnav	29,014	2.76	
AIMIM	Rana Ranjit	11,979		
Margin of victory		29,143	2.76	
Turnout		10,55,989	57.56	
JD(U) gain from BJP		Swing		

=== 2019 ===
2019 Indian general elections: Sheohar
Party	Candidate	Votes	%	±%
BJP	Rama Devi	608,678	60.59	+16.40
RJD	Syed Faisal Ali	2,68,318	26.71	−1.32
IND.	Kedar Nath Prasad	18,426	1.83	+1.83
IND.	Raj Kumar Parsad	13,704	1.36	+1.36
NCP	Shah Alam	13,269	1.32	+1.32
BSP	Mukesh Kumar Jha	12,470	1.24	−1.90
NOTA	None of the Above	7,017	0.70	−0.68
Margin of victory		3,40,360	33.88	+17.72
Turnout		10,04,927	59.60	+2.87
BJP hold		Swing	+16.40	

=== 2014 ===
2014 Indian general elections: Sheohar
Party	Candidate	Votes	%	±%
BJP	Rama Devi	372,506	44.19	+3.39
RJD	Mohammad Anwarul Haque	2,36,267	28.03	+12.38
JD(U)	Shahid Ali Khan	79,108	9.39	+9.39
SP	Lovely Anand	46,008	5.46	+5.46
BSP	Angesh Kumar	26,446	3.14	−15.70
JMM	Laxman Paswan	18,681	2.22	+2.22
IND	Shivanandan Prasad	12,161	1.44	+1.44
NOTA	None of the Above	11,670	1.38	+1.38
Margin of victory		1,36,239	16.16	−5.80
Turnout		8,42,926	56.73	+11.64
BJP hold		Swing	+3.39	

=== 2009 ===
2009 Indian general elections: Sheohar
Party	Candidate	Votes	%	±%
BJP	Rama Devi	233,499	40.80	
BSP	Mohammad Anwarul Haque	1,07,815	18.84	
RJD	Sitaram Singh	89,584	15.65	
INC	Lovely Anand	81,479	14.24	
CPI	Mohammad Tanveer Zafar	16,864	2.95	
IND.	Sunil Singh	10,037	1.75	
Margin of victory		1,25,684	21.96	
Turnout		5,73,012	45.15	
BJP gain from RJD		Swing		
