= Lauthaha =

Lautaha
- Town
- Location in Bihar, India
- Coordinates: 26.62961°N 84.90964°E
- Country: India
- State: Bihar
- District: Purvi Champaran

Population (2001)
  - Total: 7,744

Languages
  - Official: Bhojpuri, Hindi
- Time zone: UTC+5:30 (IST)
- Lok Sabha constituency: Purvi Champaran
- Vidhan Sabha constituency: Motihari
- Website: eastchamparan.bih.nic.in

Lauthaha is a city and a notified area in Purvi Champaran district in the Indian state of Bihar.

== Geography ==
Lauthaha is located at 26°37′47″N 84°54′35″E

== Demographics ==
As of 2001 India census, Lauthaha had a population of 7744. Males constitute 63% of the population and females 37%. Lauthaha has an average literacy rate of 75%, higher than the national average of 59.5%: male literacy is 78%, and female literacy is 70%. In Lauthaha, 10% of the population is under 6 years of age.

== Transportation ==
Motihari Court railway station is the nearest railway station of Lauthaha town. It is situated on Muzaffarpur–Gorakhpur main line under the Samastipur railway division.

=== Road ===
Lauthaha, Motihar to Mehsi, the nearest major commercial and transport hub, is located 40 kilometers away from Lauthaha. There is good road connectivity from here to other parts of Bihar and the rest of India. Taxi, shared bus, and shared taxi services also operate between Lauthaha, Mehsi, Muzaffarpur, and Patna.
