= Motihari village, Bihar =

Motihari
- City
- Motihari
- Location within Bihar
- Coordinates: 27.108°N 84.464°E
- Country: India
- State: Bihar
- District: East Champaran district
- Municipal corporation House: Municipal corporation House Of motihari or Nagar Bhavan of motihari

Government
  - Type: Municipal corporation
  - Body: Municipal corporation of motihari
  - Mayor: Preeti Gupta
  - M.L.A: Pramod Kumar

Area
  - Total: 21 km^{2} (8.1 sq mi)
- Elevation: 67 m (220 ft)
  - Rank: 20
- Demonym: Motiharivashi

Language
  - Official: Hindi

Local language
  - Regional language: Bhojpuri, Maithli, Bengali
- Time zone: UTC+5:30 (IST)
- ISO 3166 code: IN-BR
- Vidhan Sabha: Motihari
- Lok Sabha: Purbi champaran

Motihari is a city in East Champaran district in the Indian state of Bihar.

== Demographics ==
As of the 2011 census of India, Motihari had a population of 976 in 198 households. Males constitute 50.7% of the population and females 49.2%. Motihari has an average literacy rate of 49.5%, lower than the national average of 74%: male literacy is 62.9%, and female literacy is 37%. In Motihari, 20.9% of the population is under 6 years of age. Motihari Is about 180 km from Patna, capital of Bihar.
