= Chailaha Halt railway station =

Railway station in Bihar, India

Chailaha Halt

General information
- Location: Chailaha, East Champaran district, Bihar; India
- Coordinates: 26°40′29″N 84°53′41″E
- Elevation: 73 m (240 ft)
- System: Passenger train station
- Owner: Indian Railways
- Operator: East Central Railway
- Line: Muzaffarpur–Gorakhpur main line
- Platforms: 1
- Tracks: 2

Construction
- Structure type: Standard (on ground station)

Other information
- Status: Active
- Station code: CHAH
- Zone(s): East Central Railway zone
- Division(s): Samastipur

History
- Opened: 1930s

Services
Preceding station	Indian Railways	Following station
Semra towards ?	East Central Railway zone Muzaffarpur–Gorakhpur main line	Bapudham Motihari towards ?
Location

Chailaha Halt railway station (station code: CHAH) is a halt railway station on Muzaffarpur–Gorakhpur main line under the Samastipur railway division of East Central Railway zone. This is situated at Chailaha in East Champaran district of the Indian state of Bihar.
