= Bangari railway station =

Railway station in Bihar, India

Bangari

General information
- Location: Bagha Dhala Road, Harpur, Bangari, East Champaran district, Bihar; India
- Coordinates: 26°32′17″N 84°55′17″E
- Elevation: 67 m (220 ft)
- System: Passenger train station
- Owner: Indian Railways
- Operator: East Central Railway
- Line: Muzaffarpur–Gorakhpur main line
- Platforms: 1
- Tracks: 2

Construction
- Structure type: Standard (on ground station)

Other information
- Status: Active
- Station code: BGAR
- Zone(s): East Central Railway zone
- Division(s): Samastipur

History
- Opened: 1930s

Services
Preceding station	Indian Railways	Following station
Jiwdhara towards ?	East Central Railway zone Muzaffarpur–Gorakhpur main line	Kunwarpur Chintamanpur towards ?
Location

Bangari railway station is a halt railway station on Muzaffarpur–Gorakhpur main line under the Samastipur railway division of East Central Railway zone. This is situated beside Bagha Dhala Road at Harpur, Bangari in East Champaran district of the Indian state of Bihar.
