= Avaneesh Kumar Singh =

Indian politician

Member of Bihar Legislative Assembly
- In office 2010–2015
- Preceded by: Constituency created
- Succeeded by: Lal Babu Prasad Gupta
- Constituency: Chiraia
- In office 2005–2010
- Preceded by: Manoj Kumar Singh
- Succeeded by: Pawan Jaiswal
- Constituency: Dhaka
- In office 1990–2000
- Preceded by: Motiur Rahman
- Succeeded by: Manoj Kumar Singh
- Constituency: Dhaka

Avaneesh Kumar Singh is an Indian politician and 6 terms MLA from Bihar who had served as MLA from 2010 to 2015 from Chiraia. He had previously represented Dhaka in the Bihar Legislative Assembly from 2005 to 2010 and 1990 to 2000 on BJP ticket. He is known as one of the very first founder's of BJP in north Bihar . He also served as president of Sunyakal Samiti at Bihar Legislative Assembly.

In 2013, despite being a BJP legislator Avaneesh Kumar Singh had opposed Narendra Modi's candidature as Prime Ministerial candidate and had supported Nitish Kumar due to which the BJP suspended him for anti-party activities. He joined Janata Dal (United) with his supporters and was given ticket to contest to 2014 Lok Sabha election from Purvi Champaran. He even got more than lakh of votes but he was not able to succeed.
