= Pandari, Bihar =

Coordinates: 25°00′N 76°42′E

Pandari is a small village in East Champaran district of Bihar state, India. It falls under Dhaka block, and is 230 km from Patna, the capital of Bihar.
