= Ekderwa =

- village
- Location in bihar, India Ekderwa (India)
- Coordinates: 27.000829°N 84.825675°E
- Country: India
- State: Bihar
- District: East Champaran
- Elevation: 68 m (223 ft)

Population (2001)
  - Total: 1,060

Languages
  - Official: Hindi, Nepali, Bhojpuri
- Time zone: UTC+5:30 (IST)
- Postal code: 845305
- ISO 3166 code: IN-BR
- Vehicle registration: BR

Ekderwa is a census town in East Champaran district in the Indian state of Bihar.

== Geography ==
Ederwa is located near a sub divisional town Raxaul Bihar, three kilometers west of the railway station of Raxaul and 1 km north from the Raxaul Airport.

== Demographics ==
As of 2001 India census, Ekderwa had a population of 1060 . Males constitute 53% of the population and females 47%. In Ekderwa, 12% of the population is under 6 years of age.

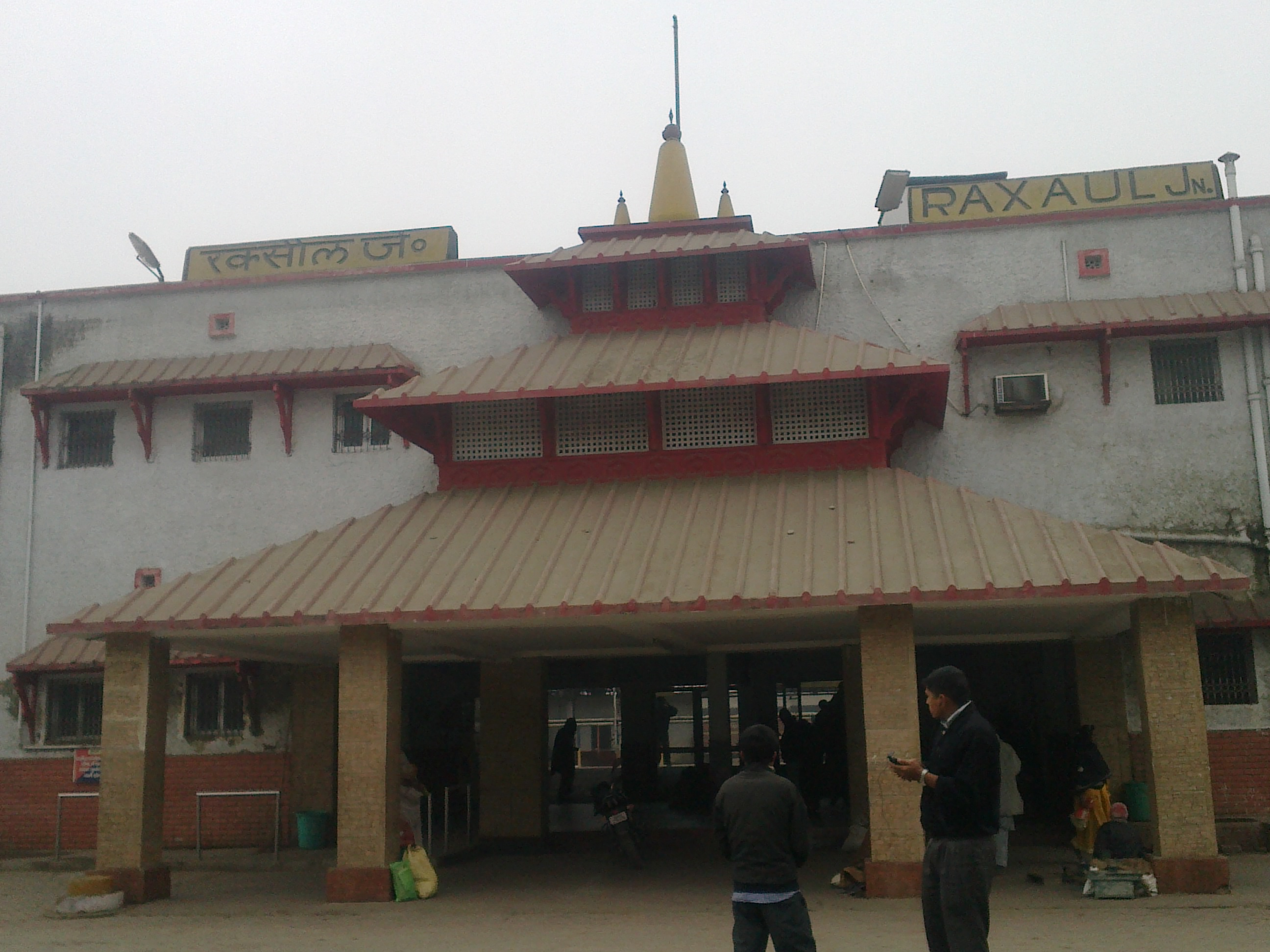
Raxaul Junction

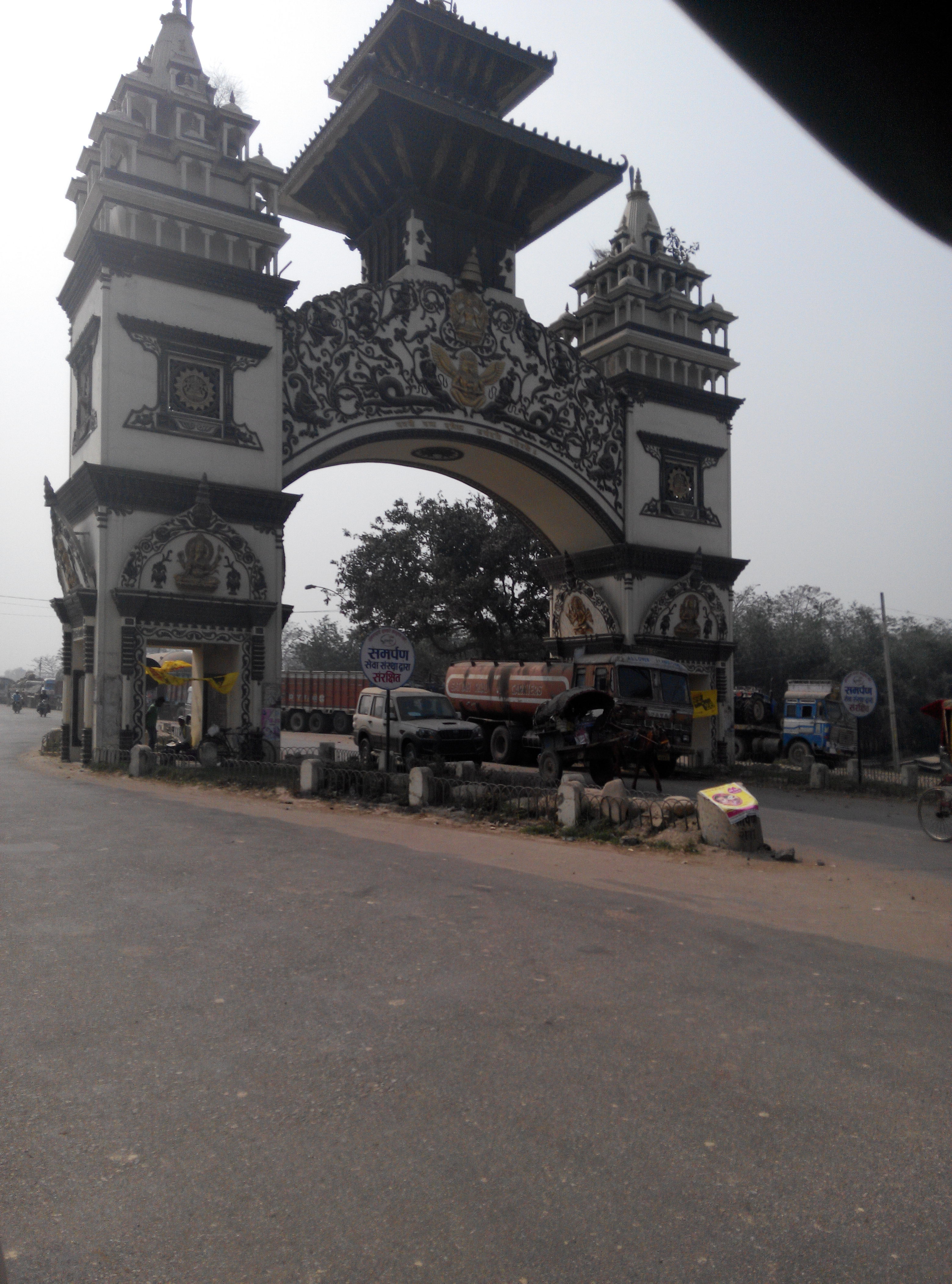
Gateway to Nepal outside Birgunj
