= KXR =

KXR or kxr may refer to:

- KXR, the station code for Kuria railway station, Bihar, India
- kxr, the ISO 639-3 code for Manus Koro language, Manus Province, Papua New Guinea
