= Motihari Court railway station =

Railway station in Bihar

Motihari Court

General information
- Location: Gandak Colony, Lauthaha, Motihari, East Champaran district, Bihar; India
- Coordinates: 26°37′32″N 84°54′20″E
- Elevation: 75 m (246 ft)
- System: Passenger train station
- Owner: Indian Railways
- Operator: East Central Railway
- Lines: Muzaffarpur–Gorakhpur main line, Sitamarhi-Sheohar-Motihari line (under construction)
- Platforms: 2
- Tracks: 3
- Connections: yes

Construction
- Structure type: Standard (on ground station)
- Parking: yes
- Accessible: yes

Other information
- Status: Active
- Station code: MCO
- Zone(s): East Central Railway zone
- Division(s): Samastipur

History
- Opened: 1913
- Closed: 2023
- Rebuilt: 2024
- Former names: Champaran

Services
Preceding station	Indian Railways	Following station
Bapudham Motihari towards ?	East Central Railway zone Muzaffarpur–Gorakhpur main line	Jiwdhara towards ?
Location

Motihari Court railway station (station code: MCO), is a halt railway station on Muzaffarpur–Gorakhpur main line under the Samastipur railway division of East Central Railway zone. This is situated at Gandak Colony, Lauthaha, Motihari in East Champaran district of the Indian state of Bihar.
