= Jiwdhara railway station =

Railway station in Bihar, India

Jiwdhara

General information
- Location: National Highway 28A, Jiwdhara, East Champaran district, Bihar; India
- Coordinates: 26°34′54″N 84°54′25″E
- Elevation: 70 m (230 ft)
- System: Passenger train station
- Owner: Indian Railways
- Operator: East Central Railway
- Line: Muzaffarpur–Gorakhpur main line
- Platforms: 2
- Tracks: 2

Construction
- Structure type: Standard (on ground station)

Other information
- Status: Active
- Station code: JDR
- Zone(s): East Central Railway zone
- Division(s): Samastipur

History
- Opened: 1930s

Services
Preceding station	Indian Railways	Following station
Motihari Court towards ?	East Central Railway zone Muzaffarpur–Gorakhpur main line	Bangari towards ?
Location

Jiwdhara railway station (station code: JDR) is a railway station on Muzaffarpur–Gorakhpur main line under the Samastipur railway division of East Central Railway zone. This is situated beside National Highway 28A at Jiwdhara in East Champaran district of the Indian state of Bihar.
