= Dhaka Lahan =

Dhaka Lahan is a small village of Dhaka Nagar Panchayat, East Champaran, Bihar, India. It is situated 1 km south from Gandhi chowk Dhaka. It is separated in ward no 19 and ward no 20, the population of this village is around 4500 of civilian, the number of voters residing in ward no 19 is 900 and ward no 20 is 1334 by 2013. The only one Govt Degree college of Dhaka constituency is also situated here name Mahaveer Upadhya Memorial Degree College.
