= Mahuawa =

- Village
- Location within Bihar
- Coordinates: 27.108°N 84.464°E
- Country: India
- State: Bihar
- District: East Champaran district

Languages
  - Official: Hindi
- Time zone: UTC+5:30 (IST)
- ISO 3166 code: IN-BR

Mahuawa is a village in East Champaran district in the Indian state of Bihar.

== Demographics ==
As of the 2011 census of India, Mahuawa had a population of 3419 in 589 households. Males constitute 51.59% of the population and females 48.4%. Mahuawa has an average literacy rate of 43.28%, lower than the national average of 74%: male literacy is 60.8%, and female literacy is 39.1%. In Mahuawa, 21.64% of the population is under 6 years of age.
