= Bijbani =

Village in Bihar, India

- Village
- Location within Bihar Location within India
- Coordinates: 26°51′10″N 85°07′09″E
- Country: India
- State: Bihar
- District: Purba Champaran
- Block: Bankatwa

Government
  - Type: Sarpanch

Area
  - Total: 21.69 km^{2} (8.37 sq mi)
- Elevation: 79 m (259 ft)

Population (2011)
  - Total: 33,876
  - Density: 1,562/km^{2} (4,045/sq mi)

Languages
  - Common: Maithili, Hindi, Urdu
- Time zone: UTC+5:30 (IST)
- PIN: 845303
- STD code: 06250
- Vehicle registration: BR-05

Bijbani is a village in the Indian state of Bihar. It is located along Indo-Nepalese border, about 32 kilometres northeast of the district seat Motihari. The village had a population of 33,876 (2011 census).

== Geography ==
Bijbani is located on the northern end of Purba Champaran District, bordering the villages of Bishunpur, Ghorasahan and Barhawa. It covers an area of 2168.7 hectares.

== Demographics ==
In the 2011 India Census, Bijbani had a population of 33,786. Out of the total population, 17,722 (52.31%) were male while 16,154 (47.69%) were female. The working population constituted 41.10% of the total population. The literacy rate was 40.03%, with 8,945 of the males and 4,615 of the females being literate.
