= Semra railway station =

Railway station in Bihar, India

Semra
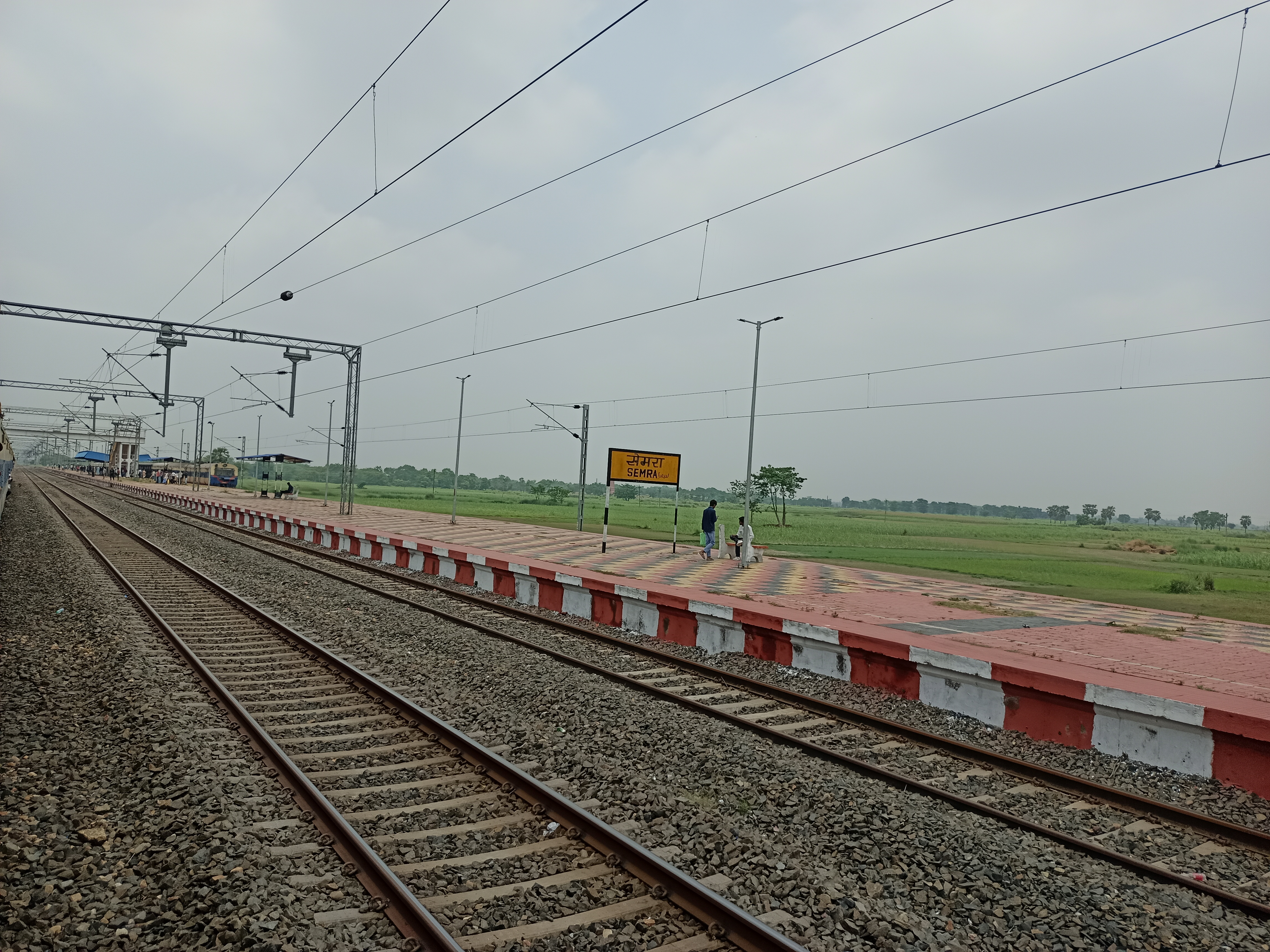
- Semra Railway Station

General information
- Location: Chhapra Bahas, Bagaha Dhala, East Champaran district, Bihar; India
- Coordinates: 26°42′43″N 84°48′49″E
- Elevation: 72 m (236 ft)
- System: Passenger train station
- Owner: Indian Railways
- Operator: East Central Railway
- Line: Muzaffarpur–Gorakhpur main line
- Platforms: 2
- Tracks: 2

Construction
- Structure type: Standard (on ground station)

Other information
- Status: Active
- Station code: SRA
- Zone(s): East Central Railway zone
- Division(s): Samastipur

History
- Opened: 1930s

Services
Preceding station	Indian Railways	Following station
Sagauli Junction towards ?	East Central Railway zone Muzaffarpur–Gorakhpur main line	Chailaha Halt towards ?
Location

Semra railway station (station code: SRA), is a railway station on Muzaffarpur–Gorakhpur main line under the Samastipur railway division of East Central Railway zone. It is situated at Chhapra Bahas, Bagaha Dhala in the East Champaran district of the Indian state of Bihar.
