= Madhuban, Bihar Assembly constituency =

Coordinates: 26°25′43″N 85°08′24″E

Madhuban, Bihar
- Constituency No. 18 for the Bihar Legislative Assembly

Constituency details
- Country: India
- Region: East India
- State: Bihar
- Division: Tirhut
- District: Purvi Champaran
- Lok Sabha constituency: Sheohar
- Established: 1957
- Total electors: 265,505
- Reservation: None

Member of Legislative Assembly
- 18th Bihar Legislative Assembly
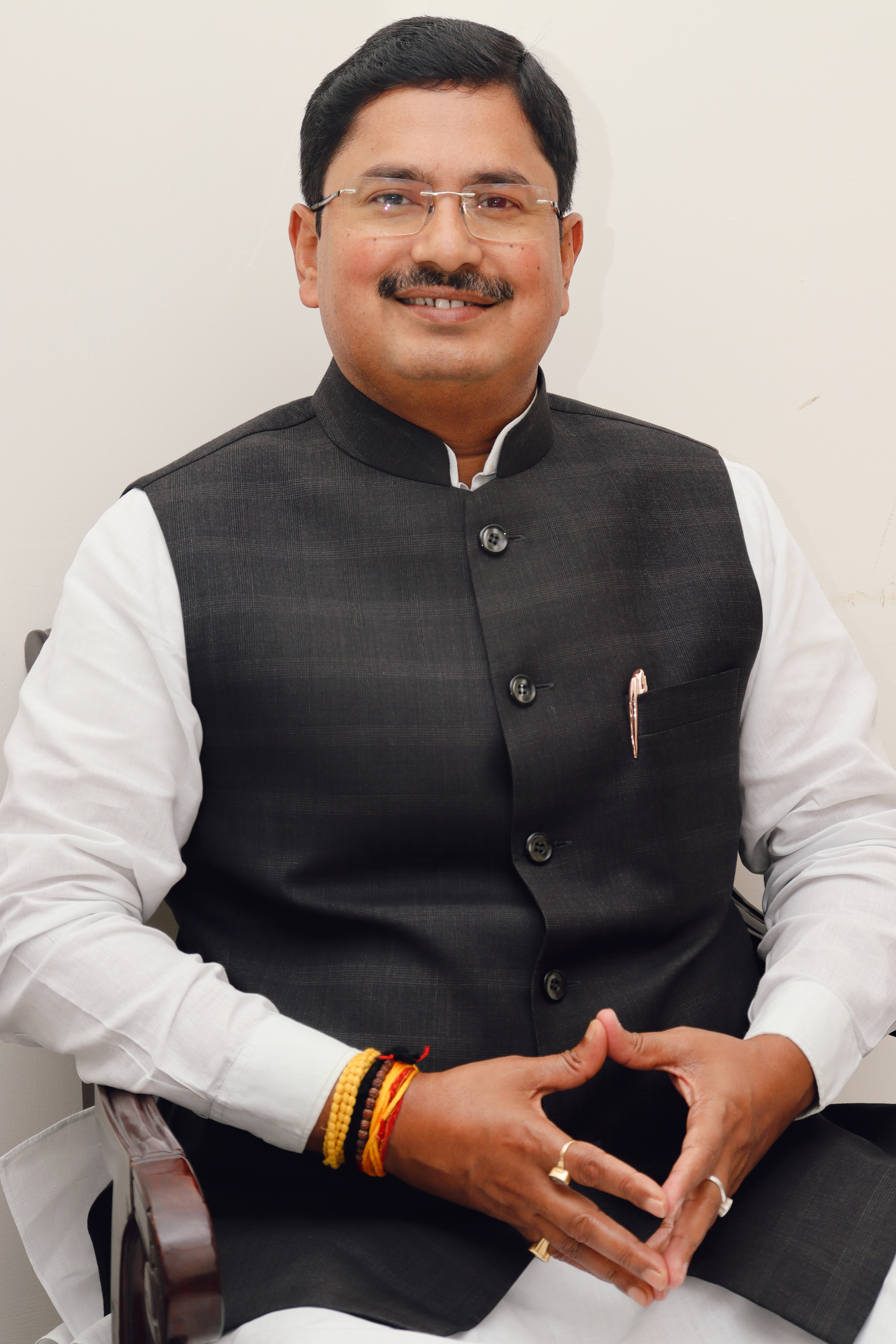
- Incumbent Rana Randhir Singh
- Party: BJP
- Alliance: NDA
- Elected year: 2025
- Preceded by: Shivjee Rai

Madhuban Assembly constituency is an assembly constituency in Purvi Champaran district in the Indian state of Bihar.

== Overview ==
As per orders of Delimitation of Parliamentary and Assembly constituencies Order, 2008, 18. Madhuban Assembly constituency is composed of the following: Madhuban, Pakridayal and Phenhara community development blocks.

Madhuban Assembly constituency is part of 4. Sheohar (Lok Sabha constituency).

== Members of the Legislative Assembly ==
| Year | Name | Party |
|---|---|---|
| 1957 | Rup Lal Rai | Independent |
| 1962 | Mangal Prasad Yadav | Indian National Congress |
| 1967 | Mahendra Bharti | Communist Party of India |
| 1969 | Mahendra Bharti | Communist Party of India |
| 1972 | Rajpati Devi | Communist Party of India |
| 1977 | Rup Lal Rai | Indian National Congress |
| 1980 | Vraj Kishore Singh | Indian National Congress (I) |
| 1985 | Sitaram Singh | Janata Party |
| 1990 | Sitaram Singh | Janata Dal |
| 1995 | Sitaram Singh | Janata Dal |
| 2000 | Sitaram Singh | Rashtriya Janata Dal |
| 2005 | Rana Randhir | Rashtriya Janata Dal |
| 2005 | Shivjee Rai | Janata Dal (United) |
| 2010 | Shivjee Rai | Janata Dal (United) |
| 2015 | Rana Randhir | Bharatiya Janata Party |
| 2020 | Rana Randhir | Bharatiya Janata Party |
| 2025 | Rana Randhir | Bharatiya Janata Party |

== Election results ==
=== 2025 ===
2025 Bihar Legislative Assembly election: Madhuban
| Party | Candidate | Votes | % | ±% |
|---|---|---|---|---|
| BJP | Rana Randhir Singh | 86,002 | 46.78 | −0.91 |
| RJD | Sandhya Rani Kushwaha | 80,510 | 43.8 | −0.06 |
| JSP | Vijay Kumar Kushwaha | 5,383 | 2.93 | |
| Independent | Shashi Ranjan Kumar Alias Sonu Singh | 2,647 | 1.44 | |
| AAP | Kunal Bhushan Alias Bittu | 2,602 | 1.42 | |
| Independent | Syed Mohammad Imam | 2,007 | 1.09 | |
| NOTA | None of the above | 2,064 | 1.12 | −1.31 |
| Majority | | 5,492 | 2.98 | −0.85 |
| Turnout | | 183,824 | 69.24 | +9.77 |
| BJP hold | | Swing | | |

=== 2020 ===
2020 Bihar Legislative Assembly election: Madhuban
| Party | Candidate | Votes | % | ±% |
|---|---|---|---|---|
| BJP | Rana Randhir Singh | 73,179 | 47.69 | +3.75 |
| RJD | Madan Prasad | 67,301 | 43.86 | |
| Independent | Shashi Ranjan Kumar | 2,639 | 1.72 | |
| JAP(L) | Shivjee Ray | 2,082 | 1.36 | −2.15 |
| NOTA | None of the above | 3,732 | 2.43 | −0.93 |
| Majority | | 5,878 | 3.83 | −7.84 |
| Turnout | | 153,448 | 59.47 | +0.03 |
| BJP hold | | Swing | | |

=== 2015 ===
2015 Bihar Legislative Assembly election: Madhuban
| Party | Candidate | Votes | % | ±% |
|---|---|---|---|---|
| BJP | Rana Randhir Singh | 61,054 | 43.94 | |
| JD(U) | Shivajee Rai | 44,832 | 32.27 | |
| BSP | Santosh Kumar Madhukar | 12,366 | 8.9 | |
| JAP(L) | Bhagwan Sah | 4,882 | 3.51 | |
| Independent | Syed Mohammad Imam | 2,837 | 2.04 | |
| Independent | Dinesh Prasad | 2,075 | 1.49 | |
| Independent | Rahul Kumar | 1,746 | 1.26 | |
| SS | Shashi Ranjan Kumar | 1,658 | 1.19 | |
| NOTA | None of the above | 4,666 | 3.36 | |
| Majority | | 16,222 | 11.67 | |
| Turnout | | 138,934 | 59.44 | |
