= Pakari Dayal, Bihar =

Pakri Dayal पकड़ीदयाल
- Nagar Panchayat
- Location in Bihar, India
- Coordinates: 26°33′11″N 85°05′39″E
- Country: India
- State: Bihar
- District: East Champaran

Government
  - Type: Nagar Panchayat
- Time zone: UTC+5:30 (IST)
- Vehicle registration: BR-05

Pakri Dayal (Hindi: पकड़ीदयाल) is a town and a Nagar Panchayat in East Champaran district of Bihar, India. It is located approximately 27 km (17 mi) southeast of Mehsi and 17 km (11 mi) northeast of Motihari, the district headquarters of East Champaran. It is connected by road with Mehsi, Motihari, and Dhaka, Bihar towns of the district.

== Geography ==
Pakri Dayal is a town and Nagar Panchayat in East Champaran district in the Indian state of Bihar. It is located in the northern part of the district and is situated on the banks of the Budhi Gandak River. The town is approximately 27 km (17 mi) southeast of Mehsi and approximately 17 km (11 mi) northeast of Motihari, the district headquarters of East Champaran.

== Administration ==
Pakri Dayal is the headquarters of the Pakaridayal subdivision (Anumandal) in East Champaran district, Bihar. The subdivision comprises the community development blocks of Pakri Dayal, Madhuban, Patahi and Phenhara.

== Transport ==
Pakri Dayal is connected by road to Motihari, Mehsi and Dhaka. While Motihari serves as the district headquarters, Mehsi provides important road and railway connectivity for the surrounding region through Mehsi railway station, linking the town with Muzaffarpur, Motihari and other parts of Bihar.
