= Motihari airport =

Motihari airport may refer to one of the airports serving the city:

- Jay Prakash Narayan Airport
- Chaudhary Charan Singh International Airport
- Raxaul Airport
