= Hari Kishore Singh =

Indian politician

Minister of State for External Affairs
- Prime Minister: V. P. Singh
- Succeeded by: Eduardo Falerio

Member of Parliament, Lok Sabha
- In office 1989-1996
- Preceded by: Ram Dulari Sinha
- Succeeded by: Anand Mohan Singh
- Constituency: Sheohar, Bihar
- In office 1971-1977
- Constituency: Pupri, Bihar

Personal details
- Born: 2 June 1934 Chamanpur, Sheohar district, Bihar, British India
- Died: 28 August 2013 (aged 79) New Delhi
- Party: Janata Dal
- Spouse: Pratibha Singh

Hari Kishore Singh was an Indian politician. He was elected to the Lok Sabha, lower house of the Parliament of India from Sheohar, Bihar as a member of the Janata Dal. He was the Minister of State for External Affairs in the V.P. Singh administration.
