= Samras Samaj Party =

India political party

Samras Samaj Party (SSP) is a former political party in Bihar. SSP was a splinter faction of Janata Dal (United) (JDU). The leader of SSP is Nagmani.

In September 2015, the leaders of six parties Samajwadi Party, Nationalist Congress Party, Jan Adhikar Party, Samras Samaj Party, National People's Party and Samajwadi Janata Dal Democratic announced the formation of a third front known as the Socialist Secular Morcha. On 15 October, NCP leader Tariq Anwar announced that his party had decided to leave the third front. Socialist Secular Morcha - announced its seat distribution: SP got 85 seats, Janadhikar Party got 64 seats, NCP got 40 seats, SSP got 28 seats, SJDD got 23 seats and NPP got three seats.

In 2017, Nagmanai joined Upendra Kushwaha's Rashtriya Lok Samta Party by merging his party and calling Kushwaha to be next Chief Minister of Bihar. Nagmanai was named National Executive President of Rashtriya Lok Samta Party.
