= Pawan Jaiswal =

Indian politician

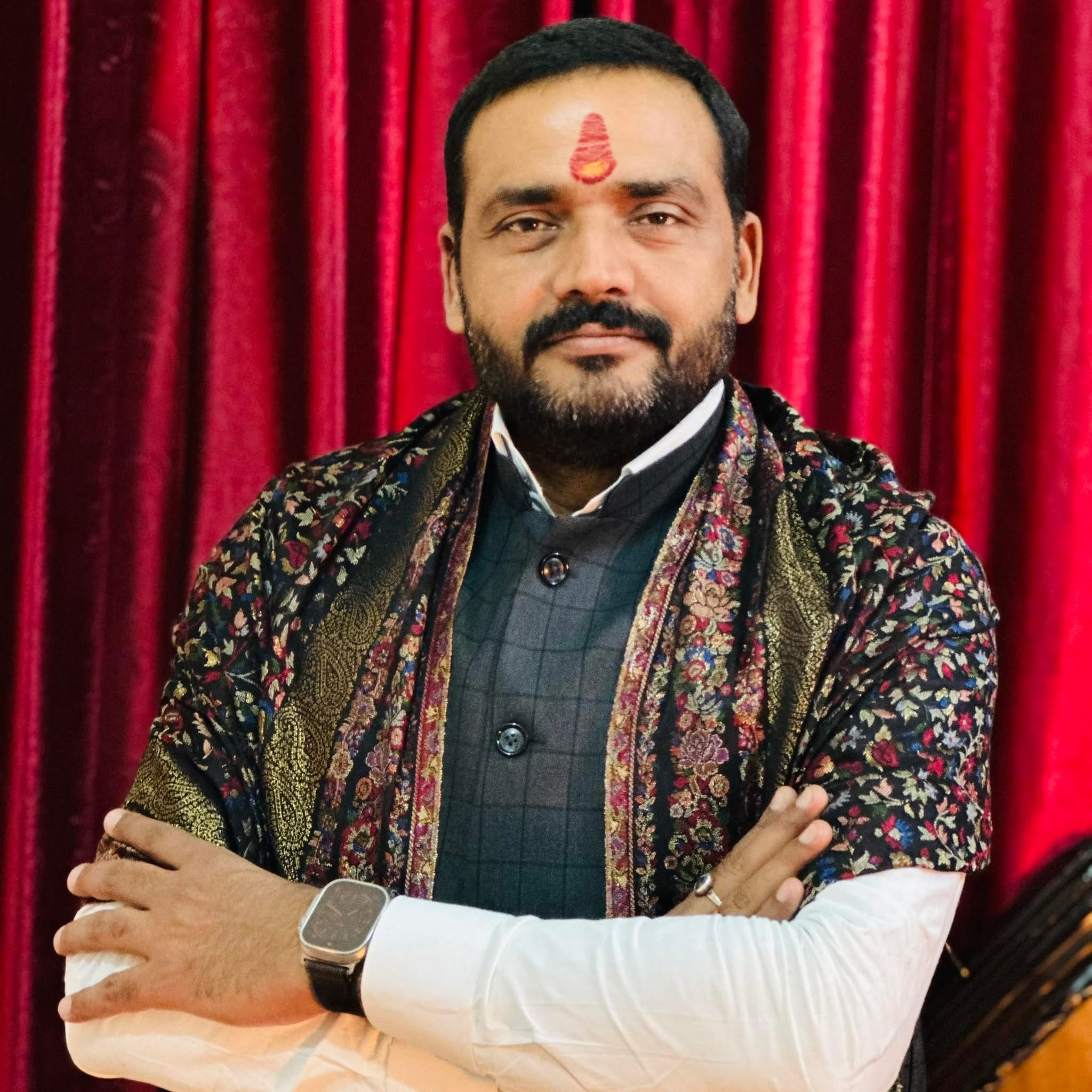

Member of Bihar Legislative Assembly
- In office 2020–2025
- Preceded by: Faisal Rahman
- Constituency: Dhaka
- In office 2010–2015
- Preceded by: Avaneesh Kumar Singh
- Succeeded by: Faisal Rahman
- Constituency: Dhaka

Personal details
- Born: 10 December 1976 (age 49)
- Party: Bharatiya Janata Party
- Spouse: Priyanka Jaiswal (m. 2003)
- Parent: Lt. Mahendar Prasad Choudhary
- Occupation: Politician

Pawan Kumar Jaiswal is an Indian politician from Bharatiya Janata Party, Bihar and a two term Member of Bihar Legislative Assembly. Jaiswal had won from Dhaka in 2010 as an independent and on a BJP ticket in 2020.

Pawan Jaiswal's leading was characterized by the active participation in the local government and the constituency development initiatives. He was involved in the infrastructure works, like finishing the Fulwariya bridge, and has been the promoter of the social welfare activities such as mass marriage events and youth programs. He also carries out public interaction sessions regularly, which include the weekly Janata-Darshan meetings, to discuss the problems brought up by the people living in his constituency.

== Early life ==
Pawan Kumar Jaiswal was born on 10 December 1976 in Phulwariya, Motihari, East Champaran district of Bihar. Jaiswal was born to a family that had zamindar lineage. His father served as headmaster in a government school. Coming from a rural background, Jaiswal went through the hardships of inadequate facilities and stagnant development that were characteristic of the area. It was through these tough times he developed his interest in public service and community development.
