= Nagmani Kushwaha =

Indian politician

Nagmani
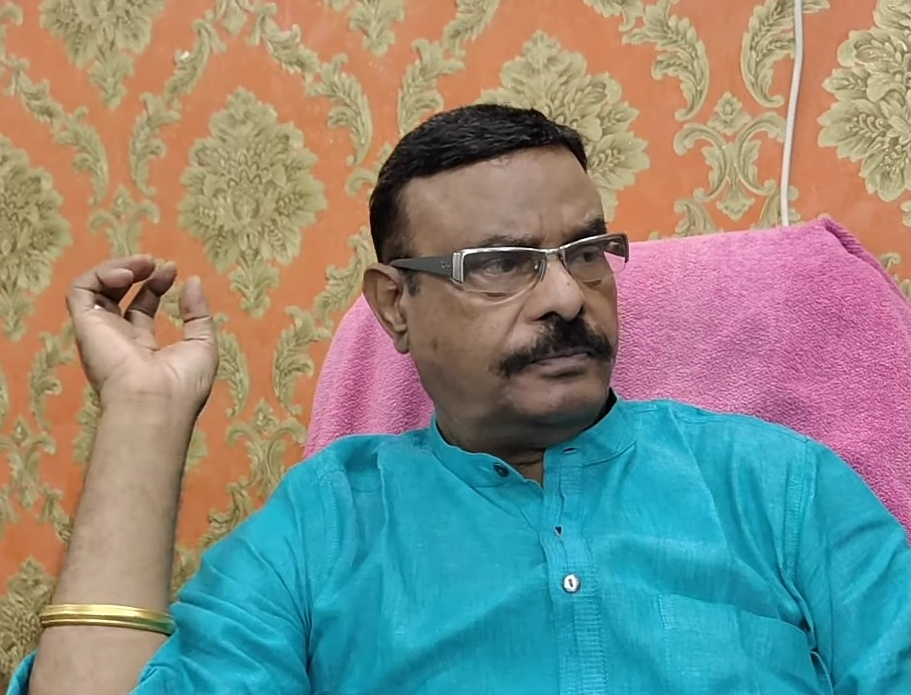

Minister of Agriculture Government of Bihar
- In office 13 April 2008 – 26 November 2010
- Preceded by: Narendra Singh
- Succeeded by: Narendra Singh

Minister of State for Social Justice & Empowerment
- In office 13 October 1999 – 22 May 2004
- Prime Minister: Atal Bihari Vajpayee
- Minister: Maneka Gandhi; Satyanarayan Jatiya

Member of Parliament, Lok Sabha
- In office 6 October 1999 – 13 May 2004
- Preceded by: Dhirendra Agarwal
- Succeeded by: Dhirendra Agarwal
- Constituency: Chatra

Personal details
- Born: Nagmani Kushwaha; 15 January 1953 (age 73) Kurhari, Jahanabad district, Bihar
- Party: Bhartiya Janta Party (2025–present); Shoshit Samaj Dal; Indian National Congress; Janata Dal; Rashtriya Janata Dal; Rashtriya Janata Dal (Democratic); Bahujan Samaj Party; Lok Janshakti Party; Janata Dal (United); Nationalist Congress Party; All Jharkhand Students Union; Samras Samaj Party; Rashtriya Lok Samta Party...
- Spouse: Suchitra Sinha
- Parent: Jagdeo Prasad (father)

Nagmani Kushwaha (born 15 January 1953) is an Indian politician from Bihar and Jharkhand. He is the son of another Bihar politician and Social ReformerJagdeo Prasad, in whose party Shoshit Samaj Dal, Nagmani started his career. He has served as an MLA for Kurtha as well as an MP for Chatra. Nagmani is known for the frequency with which he changes parties - As of 2014, he had changed political affiliations 11 times.

He announced the formation of Rashtriya Shoshit Samaj Party on 13 September 2021.

== Political career ==
In 2001, he broke away from the Rashtriya Janata Dal to form Rashtriya Janata Dal (Democratic) and was made Minister of State for Social Justice & Empowerment in the Vajpayee government. He later merged Rashtriya Janata Dal (Democratic) with the Bhartiya Janata Party. Post Bhartiya Janata Party lost power in the center, Nagmani joined Ram Vilas Paswan's Lok Janshakti Party before switch over to the Janata Dal (United). His wife made a minister in the Nitish Kumar government and he was elected in the Bihar Legislative Council. Then he joined Nationalist Congress Party but left ahead of the 2014 Lok Sabha elections and joined All Jharkhand Students Union.

In 2015, he formed Samras Samaj Party announced the formation of a third front known as the Socialist Secular Morcha an alliance of six parties SP, Nationalist Congress Party, Jan Adhikar Party, Samras Samaj Party, (National People's Party) and Samajwadi Janata Party.

In 2017, Nagmanai joined Upendra Kushwaha's Rashtriya Lok Samta Party by merging his party and calling Kushwaha to be next Chief Minister of Bihar. He was named National Executive President of Rashtriya Lok Samta Party but was sacked for allegedly indulging in anti-party activities in 2019. He resigned from the party. Following which he joined the Janata Dal (United) but quit six months later.
