= Dhaka Assembly constituency =

Coordinates: 26°41′N 85°10′E

Dhaka
- Constituency No. - for the Bihar Legislative Assembly

Constituency details
- Country: India
- Region: East India
- State: Bihar
- Division: Tirhut
- District: East Champaran
- Lok Sabha constituency: Sheohar
- Established: 1951
- Total electors: 335,844
- Reservation: None

Member of Legislative Assembly
- 18th Bihar Legislative Assembly
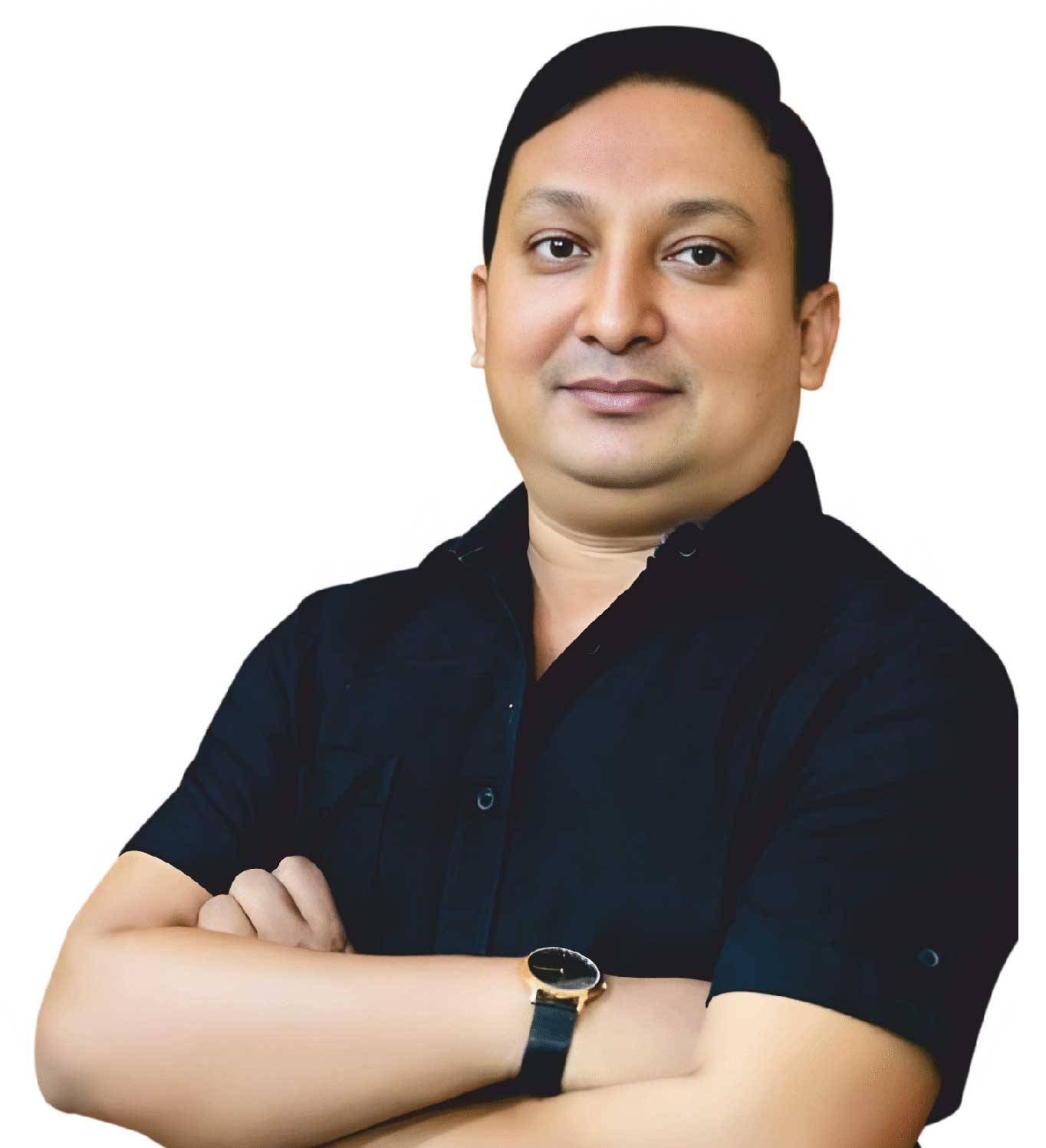
- Incumbent Faisal Rahman
- Party: RJD
- Alliance: MGB
- Elected year: 2025
- Preceded by: Pawan Kumar Jaiswal

Dhaka is an assembly constituency in the Indian state of Bihar, in East Champaran district.

== Overview ==
As per orders of Delimitation of Parliamentary and Assembly constituencies Order, 2008, 21. Dhaka Assembly constituency is composed of the following: Dhaka and Ghorasahan community development blocks.

Dhaka Assembly constituency is part of 4. Sheohar (Lok Sabha constituency).

== Members of the Legislative Assembly ==
Year	Name	Party
1952	Masoodur Rahman	Indian National Congress
1957	Masoodur Rahman	Indian National Congress
1962	Nek Mahamad	Communist Party of India
1967	S. N. Sharma	Praja Socialist Party
1969	Masoodur Rahman	Indian National Congress
1972	Hafiz Idris Ansari	Indian National Congress
1977	Siyaram Thakur	Janata Party
1980	Motiur Rahman	Indian National Congress (I)
1985	Motiur Rahman	Indian National Congress
1990	Avaneesh Kumar Singh	Bharatiya Janata Party
1995	Avaneesh Kumar Singh	Bharatiya Janata Party
2000	Manoj Kumar Singh	Rashtriya Janata Dal
2005	Avaneesh Kumar Singh	Bharatiya Janata Party
2005	Avaneesh Kumar Singh	Bharatiya Janata Party
2010	Pawan Jaiswal	Independent
2015	Faisal Rahman	Rashtriya Janata Dal
2020	Pawan Jaiswal	Bharatiya Janata Party
2025	Faisal Rahman	Rashtriya Janata Dal

== Election results ==
=== 2025 ===
2025 Bihar Legislative Assembly election: Dhaka
Party	Candidate	Votes	%	±%
RJD	Faisal Rahman	112,727	45.72	+2.57
BJP	Pawan Kumar Jaiswal	112,549	45.64	−2.37
JSP	Doctor L. B. Prasad	8,347	3.39	
AIMIM	Rana Ranjit	5,730	2.32	
NOTA	None of the above	3,047	1.24	−0.19
Majority		178	0.08	−4.78
Turnout		246,580	73.42	+8.69
RJD gain from BJP		Swing		

=== 2020 ===
Bihar Assembly election, 2020: Dhaka
Party	Candidate	Votes	%	±%
BJP	Pawan Kumar Jaiswal	99,792	48.01	+11.35
RJD	Faisal Rahman	89,678	43.15	−3.82
RLSP	Ram Pukar Sinha	10,932	5.26	
NOTA	None of the above	2,965	1.43	+0.06
Majority		10,114	4.86	−5.45
Turnout		207,840	64.73	−0.53
BJP gain from RJD		Swing		

=== 2015 ===
- Faisal Rahman of RJD, won the Dhaka assembly seat defeating his nearest rival Pawan Jaiswal of BJP.

2015 Bihar Legislative Assembly election: Dhaka
Party	Candidate	Votes	%	±%
RJD	Faisal Rahman	87,458	46.97	
BJP	Pawan Kumar Jaiswal	68,261	36.66	
Independent	Ram Pukar Sinha	20,160	10.83	
NCP	Nek Mohammad	1,868	1.0	
NOTA	None of the above	2,548	1.37	
Majority		19,197	10.31	
Turnout		186,214	65.26	

=== 2010 ===
- Pawan Kumar Jaiswal (IND), defeated Faisal Rahman of JD-U

Of Margin 5234 vote.

=== 1972 ===
- Hafiz Idris Ansari (INC): 18,619 votes
- Nek Mahamad Akhtar (IND): 15,688 votes
