= Moti Lal Prasad =

Indian politician

Minister of Art, Culture & Youth Government of Bihar
- In office 26 February 2025 – 20 November 2025
- Chief Minister: Nitish Kumar
- Preceded by: Vijay Sinha
- Succeeded by: Arun Shankar Prasad

Member of Bihar Legislative Assembly
- In office 2020 – November 2025
- Preceded by: Amit Kumar
- Succeeded by: Baidyanath Prasad
- Constituency: Riga
- In office 2010–2015
- Preceded by: Constituency created
- Succeeded by: Amit Kumar
- Constituency: Riga

Personal details
- Born: 2 July 1961 (age 64)
- Party: Bharatiya Janata Party
- Occupation: Politician

Moti Lal Prasad is an Indian politician from Bharatiya Janata Party, Bihar and a two term Member of Bihar Legislative Assembly from Riga Assembly constituency.
