= Riga Assembly constituency =

Coordinates: 26°38′40″N 85°26′21″E

Riga
- Constituency No. 23 for the Bihar Legislative Assembly

Constituency details
- Country: India
- Region: East India
- State: Bihar
- District: Sitamarhi
- Lok Sabha constituency: Sheohar
- Established: 2008
- Total electors: 317,263
- Reservation: None

Member of Legislative Assembly
- 18th Bihar Legislative Assembly
- Incumbent Baidyanath Prasad
- Party: BJP
- Alliance: NDA
- Elected year: 2025

Riga is one of the 243 constituencies of the Bihar Legislative Assembly in the Indian state of Bihar. It lies in Sitamarhi district.

== Overview ==
As per Delimitation of Parliamentary and Assembly constituencies Order, 2008, the Riga constituency is composed of the following: Riga, Bairgania and Suppi community development blocks.

Riga is part of Sheohar Lok Sabha constituency.

== Members of the Legislative Assembly ==
| Year | Name | Party |
|---|---|---|
Until 2008: Constituency did not exist
| 2010 | Moti Lal Prasad | Bharatiya Janata Party |
| 2015 | Amit Kumar | Indian National Congress |
| 2020 | Moti Lal Prasad | Bharatiya Janata Party |
| 2025 | Baidyanath Prasad | Bharatiya Janata Party |

== Election results ==
=== 2025 ===
2025 Bihar Legislative Assembly election: Riga
| Party | Candidate | Votes | % | ±% |
|---|---|---|---|---|
| BJP | Baidhyanath Prasad | 117,393 | 54.11 | +1.04 |
| INC | Amit Kumar | 84,268 | 38.84 | +3.88 |
| Independent | Ramashish Ray | 4,041 | 1.86 | |
| JSP | Krishna Mohan Singh | 3,078 | 1.42 | |
| Rashtriya Jansambhavna Party | Upendra Sahani | 2,256 | 1.04 | |
| NOTA | None of the above | 2,799 | 1.29 | +0.82 |
| Majority | | 33,125 | 15.27 | −2.84 |
| Turnout | | 216,942 | 68.38 | +10.98 |
| BJP hold | | Swing | NDA | |

=== 2020 ===
2020 Bihar Legislative Assembly election: Riga
| Party | Candidate | Votes | % | ±% |
|---|---|---|---|---|
| BJP | Motilal Prasad | 95,226 | 53.07 | +18.23 |
| INC | Amit Kumar | 62,731 | 34.96 | −14.01 |
| BSP | Munni Singh | 4,255 | 2.37 | +0.74 |
| Independent | Girdhari Sah | 2,617 | 1.46 | |
| BMP | Samsuddin Ansari | 2,343 | 1.31 | |
| NOTA | None of the above | 837 | 0.47 | −0.21 |
| Majority | | 32,495 | 18.11 | +3.98 |
| Turnout | | 179,449 | 57.4 | +0.13 |
| BJP gain from INC | | Swing | | |

=== 2015 ===
2015 Bihar Legislative Assembly election: Riga
| Party | Candidate | Votes | % | ±% |
|---|---|---|---|---|
| INC | Amit Kumar | 79,217 | 48.97 | |
| BJP | Moti Lal Prasad | 56,361 | 34.84 | |
| CPI | Atul Bihari Mishra | 4,262 | 2.63 | |
| Independent | Braj Mohan Kumar | 3,358 | 2.08 | |
| Independent | Priyatam Paswan | 2,743 | 1.7 | |
| BSP | Umesh Sah | 2,635 | 1.63 | |
| Independent | Sada Babu Singh | 2,613 | 1.62 | |
| NCP | Rambabu Sah | 1,488 | 0.92 | |
| NOTA | None of the above | 1,105 | 0.68 | |
| Majority | | 22,856 | 14.13 | |
| Turnout | | 161,768 | 57.27 | |
