= Chiraia Assembly constituency =

Coordinates: 26°40′26″N 85°16′47″E

Chiraia
- Constituency No. - for the Bihar Legislative Assembly

Constituency details
- Country: India
- Region: East India
- State: Bihar
- Division: Tirhut
- District: East Champaran
- Lok Sabha constituency: Sheohar
- Established: 2008
- Total electors: 289,283
- Reservation: None

Member of Legislative Assembly
- 18th Bihar Legislative Assembly
- Incumbent Lal Babu Prasad Gupta
- Party: BJP
- Alliance: NDA
- Elected year: 2025
- Preceded by: Avaneesh Kumar Singh

Chiraia Assembly constituency is an assembly constituency in Purvi Champaran district in the Indian state of Bihar.

== Overview ==
As per orders of Delimitation of Parliamentary and Assembly constituencies Order, 2008, 20. Chiraiya Assembly constituency is composed of the following: Chiraiya and Patahi community development blocks.

Chiraia Assembly constituency is part of 4. Sheohar (Lok Sabha constituency).

== Members of the Legislative Assembly ==
Year	Name	Party
Until 2008: Constituency did not exist
2010	Avaneesh Kumar Singh	Bharatiya Janata Party
2015	Lal Babu Prasad Gupta	Bharatiya Janata Party
2020	Lal Babu Prasad Gupta	Bharatiya Janata Party
2025	Lal Babu Prasad Gupta	Bharatiya Janata Party

== Election results ==
=== 2025 ===
2025 Bihar Legislative Assembly election: Chiraia
Party	Candidate	Votes	%	±%
BJP	Lal Babu Prasad Gupta	90,572	45.65	▲8.03
RJD	Laxmi Narayan Prasad Yadav	51,212	25.81	▼1.72
Independent	Achchhelal Prasad	34,874	17.58	
JSP	Sanjay Singh	15,590	7.86	
Janshakti Janta Dal	Mukesh Kumar	2,920	1.47	
NOTA	None of the above	2,474	1.25	▲0.34
Majority		39,360	19.84	▲9.75
Turnout		198,418	68.59	▲11.96
BJP hold		Swing		

=== 2020 ===
Bihar Assembly election, 2020: Chiraia
Party	Candidate	Votes	%	±%
BJP	Lal Babu Prasad Gupta	62,904	37.62	▼4.81
RJD	Acchelal Yadav	46,030	27.53	▼11.95
Independent	Laxmi Narayan Prasad Yadav	16,395	9.81	
Independent	Avaneesh Kumar Singh	11,430	6.84	
Independent	Sanjay Kumar	9,273	5.55	
RLSP	Madhurendra Kumar Singh	4,518	2.7	
Independent	Prabhash Ranjan Urf Chandan	1,923	1.15	
NOTA	None of the above	1,526	0.91	▼0.72
Majority		16,874	10.09	▲7.14
Turnout		167,191	56.63	▲1.19
BJP hold		Swing		

=== 2015 ===
2015 Bihar Legislative Assembly election: Chiraia
Party	Candidate	Votes	%	±%
BJP	Lal Babu Prasad Gupta	62,831	42.43	
RJD	Laxmi Narayan Prasad Yadav	58,457	39.48	
SP	Avaneesh Kumar Singh	12,172	8.22	
BSP	Om Prakash	4,531	3.06	
Independent	Hiralal Ray	1,754	1.18	
JAP(L)	Arun Singh	1,559	1.05	
Independent	Satrudhan Singh	1,327	0.9	
NOTA	None of the above	2,418	1.63	
Majority		4,374	2.95	
Turnout		148,082	55.44	
