= Baidyanath Prasad =

Indian politician

Member of Bihar Legislative Assembly
- Incumbent
- Assumed office 2025
- Preceded by: Moti Lal Prasad
- Constituency: Riga

Member of Bihar Legislative Council
- In office 17 July 2009 – 16 July 2015
- Preceded by: Dilip Kumar Yadav
- Succeeded by: Dilip Rai
- Constituency: Sitamarhi-Sheohar Local Authorities

Personal details
- Born: September 29, 1959 (age 66) Sultanpur, Sheohar district, Bihar, India
- Party: Bharatiya Janata Party
- Other political affiliations: Indian National Congress (until 1996)
- Spouse: Married
- Children: Two sons and three daughters
- Education: Intermediate (Science)
- Occupation: Politician

Baidyanath Prasad (born 29 September 1959) is an Indian politician from Bihar. He has been associated with both the Indian National Congress and the Bharatiya Janata Party (BJP) during his political career. Over the years, he has held several positions in local governance and has contested multiple elections for the Bihar Legislative Assembly and the Bihar Legislative Council.

== Early life and education ==
Baidyanath Prasad was born on 29 September 1959 in the village of Sultanpur, under Tariani Chowk Police Station in the district of Sheohar, Bihar. He is the son of the late Rajanandan Prasad. He completed his education up to the Intermediate (Science) level. He is married and has two sons and three daughters.

== Political and social career ==
Baidyanath Prasad began his public life in local governance. In May 1978, he was elected as the Mukhiya of the Gram Panchayat Raj, Belhiya, Sultanpur, in Belsand Block, Sitamarhi district. In March 1979, he became the Pramukh of the Belsand Block Panchayat Samiti. In November 1980, he was elected as the Vice President of the Zila Parishad, Sitamarhi.

In February 1985, he contested the Bihar Legislative Assembly election from the Sonbarsha constituency as a candidate of the Indian National Congress, opposing former Chief Minister Karpoori Thakur. From July 1985 to 1989, he served as the President of the District Youth Congress and was also a member of the District Twenty Point Programme Implementation Committee during this period.

He contested the Belsand Assembly election in 1995 as an independent candidate. Between 1992 and February 1995, he served as a State Representative of the Bihar Pradesh Congress Committee.

On 15 April 1996, Baidyanath Prasad joined the Bharatiya Janata Party (BJP). He later served as a member of the Sheohar Zila Parishad from 15 April 2001 until the Panchayat elections in 2006. In July 2003, he contested the Bihar Legislative Council election from the Sitamarhi-cum-Sheohar Local Authorities constituency as a BJP-supported candidate. In November 2005, he contested the Sursand Assembly constituency as a BJP candidate and finished second.

== Personal life ==
Baidyanath Prasad is married and has two sons and three daughters.

== See also ==
- Bihar Legislative Council
- Bharatiya Janata Party, Bihar
