= Rana Randhir =

Indian politician

Rana Randhir (राणा रणधीर)
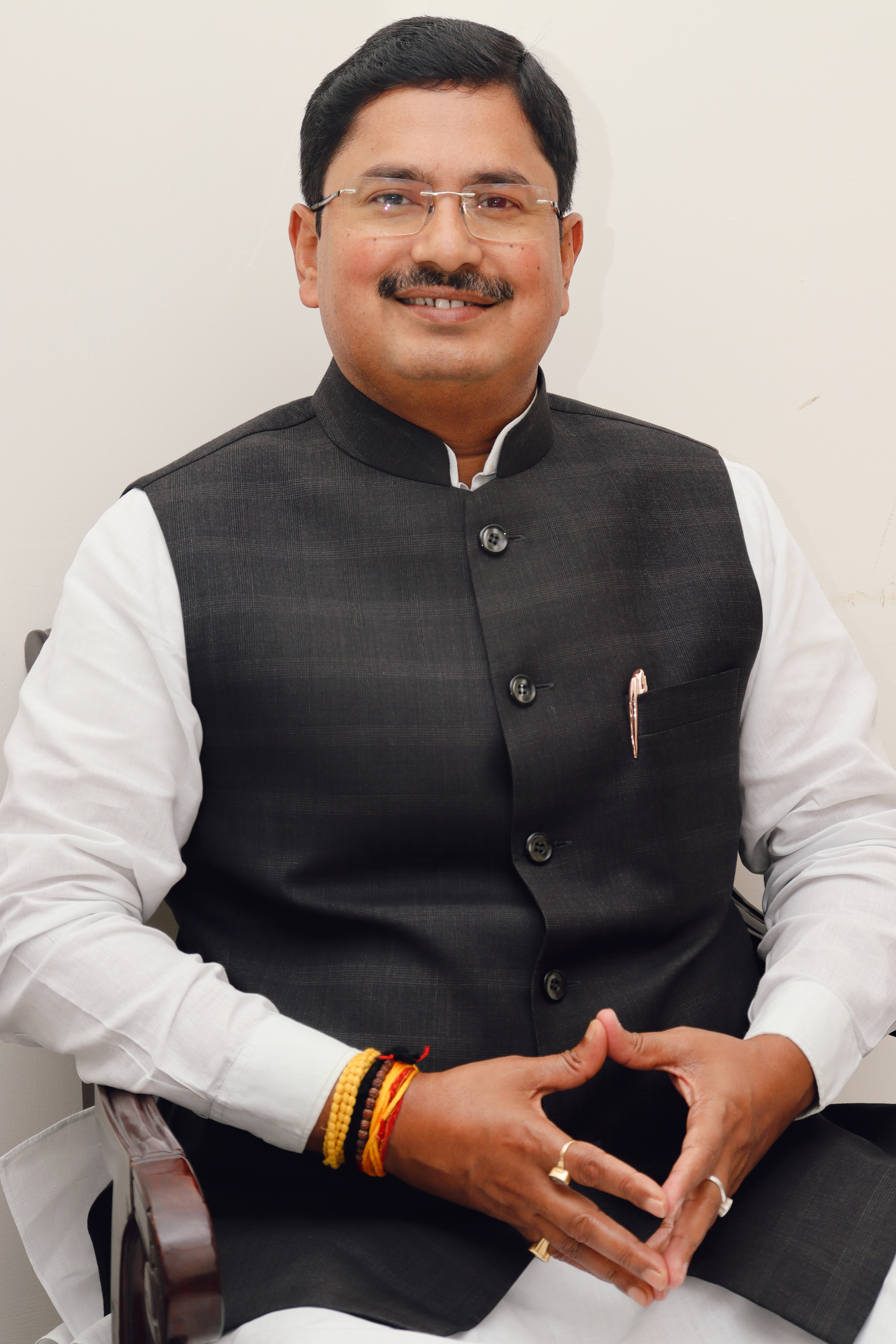

Minister of Co-operative Government of Bihar
- In office 29 July 2017 – 16 November 2020
- Chief Minister: Nitish Kumar
- Preceded by: Alok Kumar Mehta
- Succeeded by: Amrendra Pratap Singh

Member of Bihar Legislative Assembly
- Incumbent
- Assumed office 2015
- Preceded by: Shivjee Rai
- Constituency: Madhuban

Personal details
- Born: 22 January 1976 (age 50) Banjaria, Madhuban, Bihar
- Party: Bharatiya Janata Party
- Occupation: Politician
- Website: ranarandhirsingh.in

Rana Randhir is a member of the Bharatiya Janata Party from Bihar. He served as Minister in Bihar Government. He has won the Bihar Legislative Assembly election in 2021 from Madhuban. His father was member of parliament.

== Personal life ==
Rana Randhir Singh was born on 22 January 1976 in Banjaria Village of Madhuban, Bihar. His Father Sitaram Singh was 4 times MLA from Madhuban Assembly and Ex MP of Sheohar . He is eldest among three sons of Sitaram Singh. He belongs to a Rajput Family.
