= Motiur Rahman (Indian politician) =

Indian politician

Motiur Rahman (1 December 1949 – 18 December 2007) was an Indian politician from the Rashtriya Janata Dal party who was a Member of the Rajya Sabha representing Bihar in the upper house of the Indian Parliament from 1980 to 1990. He served as Member of the Bihar Legislative Assembly from Dhaka for two consecutive terms representing the Indian National Congress.

His son Faisal Rahman was an MLA from the Dhaka constituency from 2015 to 2020.
