= Rashtriya Janata Dal (Democratic) =

- Abbreviation: RJD(D)
- Leader: Nagmani
- Founder: Nagmani
- Founded: 2001
- Dissolved: 2003
- Split from: Rashtriya Janata Dal
- Merged into: Bharatiya Janata Party
- ECI status: Registered unrecognized
- Alliance: National Democratic Alliance (2001–2003)

Rashtriya Janata Dal (Democratic) (National People's Party (Democratic)), political party in India, formed when a group of five MPs (three Lok Sabha, two Rajya Sabha) broke away from Rashtriya Janata Dal 2001. RJD(D) joined National Democratic Alliance and RJD(D) leader Nagmani became a minister in the government of Atal Bihari Vajpayee 2003. Later the same year RJD(D) merged with the Bharatiya Janata Party.
