= Lal Babu Prasad Gupta =

Indian politician from Bihar

Member of Bihar Legislative Assembly
- Incumbent
- Assumed office 2015
- Preceded by: Avaneesh Kumar Singh
- Constituency: Chiraia

Personal details
- Born: 1 January 1957 (age 69)
- Party: Bharatiya Janata Party
- Occupation: Politician

Lal Babu Prasad Gupta is a member of the Bharatiya Janata Party from Bihar. He has won the Bihar Legislative Assembly election in 2015 and 2020 from Chiraia.

== Career ==
Gupta contested in 2015 Bihar Legislative Assembly election and defeated Laxmi Narayan Yadav of Rashtriya Janata Dal to become an MLA for the first time. He defeated Yadav with a margin of over four thousand votes. He was again made a candidate for the polls of 2020 and this time, he defeated Acche Lal Yadav of RJD to retain the constituency and become an MLA for the second time.
