= Faisal Rahman =

Indian politician

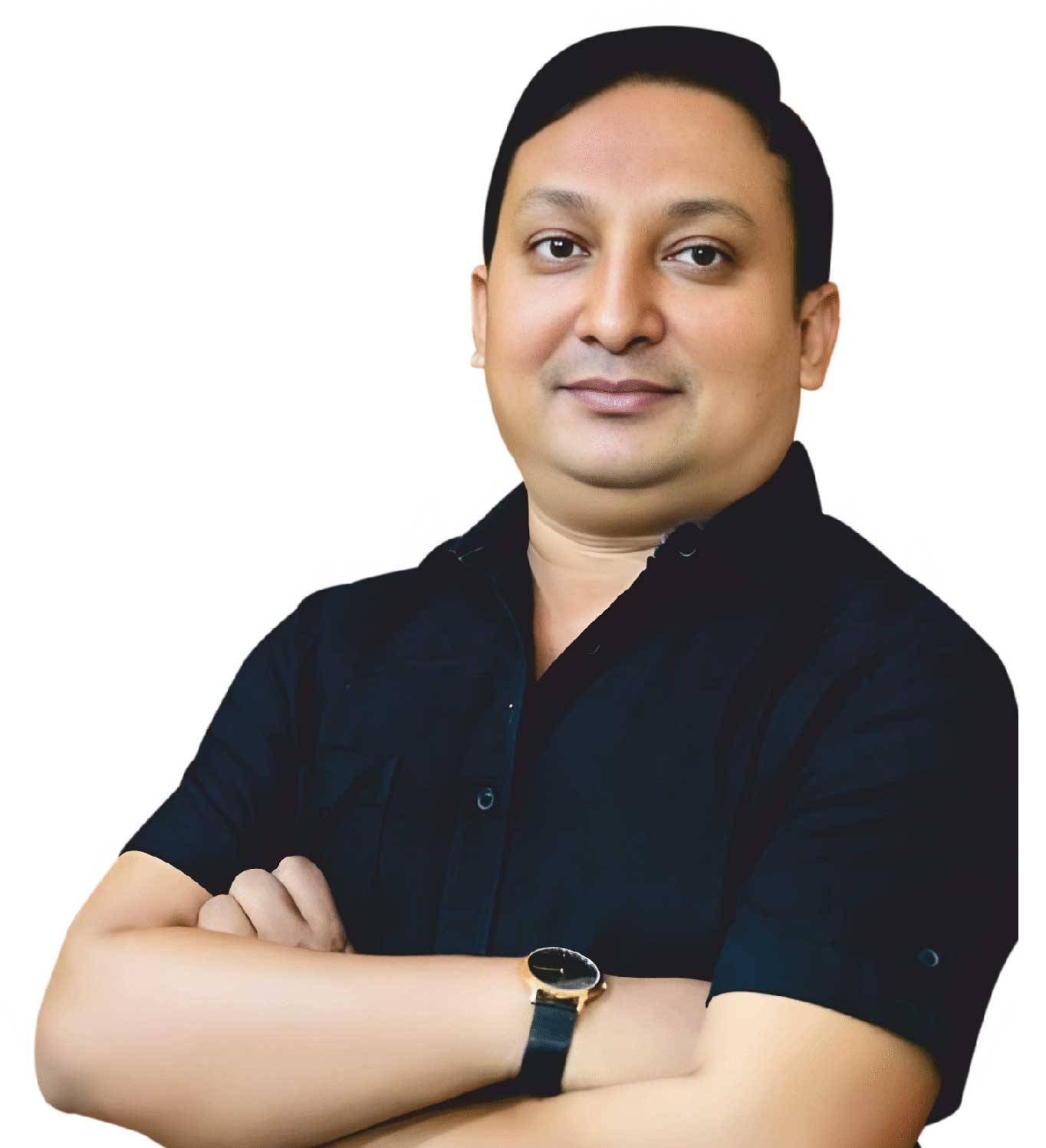

Member of the Bihar Legislative Assembly
- Incumbent
- Assumed office 14 Nov 2025
- Preceded by: Pawan Kumar Jaiswal
- In office 2015–2020
- Preceded by: Pawan Kumar Jaiswal
- Succeeded by: Pawan Kumar Jaiswal
- Constituency: Dhaka

Personal details
- Born: Sapahi, Dhaka subdivision, East Champaran, Bihar, India
- Party: Rashtriya Janata Dal
- Children: 3
- Education: Schooling up to 10th grade
- Occupation: Agriculturist, social worker

Faisal Rahman is an Indian politician from the Rashtriya Janata Dal (RJD). He served as a Member of the Bihar Legislative Assembly representing the Dhaka constituency in East Champaran district from 2015 to 2020.

== Early life and education ==
Faisal Rahman was born in Sapahi town of the Dhaka subdivision, East Champaran district, Bihar. According to his 2015 election affidavit, he completed schooling up to the 10th grade and lists his profession as agriculture and social service.

== Political career ==
=== 2010 election ===
Rahman made his first electoral bid in the 2010 Bihar Legislative Assembly election from Dhaka on a Janata Dal (United) ticket but was defeated by independent candidate Pawan Kumar Jaiswal.

=== 2015 election and tenure ===
In the 2015 election, standing for RJD, he defeated BJP’s Pawan Kumar Jaiswal by a margin of 19,197 votes, securing 47.07% of the vote to Jaiswal’s 37.48%. He served in the Sixteenth Legislative Assembly from November 2015 to August 2020.

During his tenure, Rahman was involved in various initiatives aimed at rural development and agricultural welfare in his constituency.

=== 2020 election ===
Rahman sought re-election in 2020 but lost to Pawan Kumar Jaiswal (BJP) by a margin of 10,114 votes, polling 43.15% to Jaiswal’s 48.01%.

== Personal life ==
He is married and has three children. As per his 2020 election affidavit, his declared assets were ₹1.68 crore, with no criminal cases pending.

== Constituency context ==
The Dhaka Assembly constituency (No. 21) covers Dhaka and Ghorasahan blocks in East Champaran district and is part of the Sheohar Lok Sabha seat. It is notable as the site of Gandhi’s 1917 Champaran Satyagraha.
