= Sitaram Singh =

Indian politician

MP
- Succeeded by: Rama Devi
- Constituency: Sheohar

Personal details
- Born: 12 November 1948 Motihari, Bihar
- Died: 11 January 2014 (aged 65) Delhi, India
- Party: RJD
- Children: 3
- As of 25 September, 2006

Sitaram Singh (12 November 1948 – 11 January 2014) was a member of the 14th Lok Sabha of India.

== Life ==
Singh represented the Sheohar constituency of Bihar and was a member of the Rashtriya Janata Dal (RJD) political party. He belonged to Rajput Community. He has served as state minister with independent charge in Bihar from 1990 to 1995. Singh has served as a cabinet minister in Bihar from 1995 to 2004. He has represented Madhuban Assembly seat for four consecutive terms from 1985 to 2004.His son Rana Randheer Singh is currently representing Madhuban assembly constituency from the BJP. Another son Rana Ranjeet Singh is candidate for 2024 general elections from Sheohar lok sabha constituency fielded by AIMIM.
