= East Champaran district =

District in Bihar, India

- District of Bihar
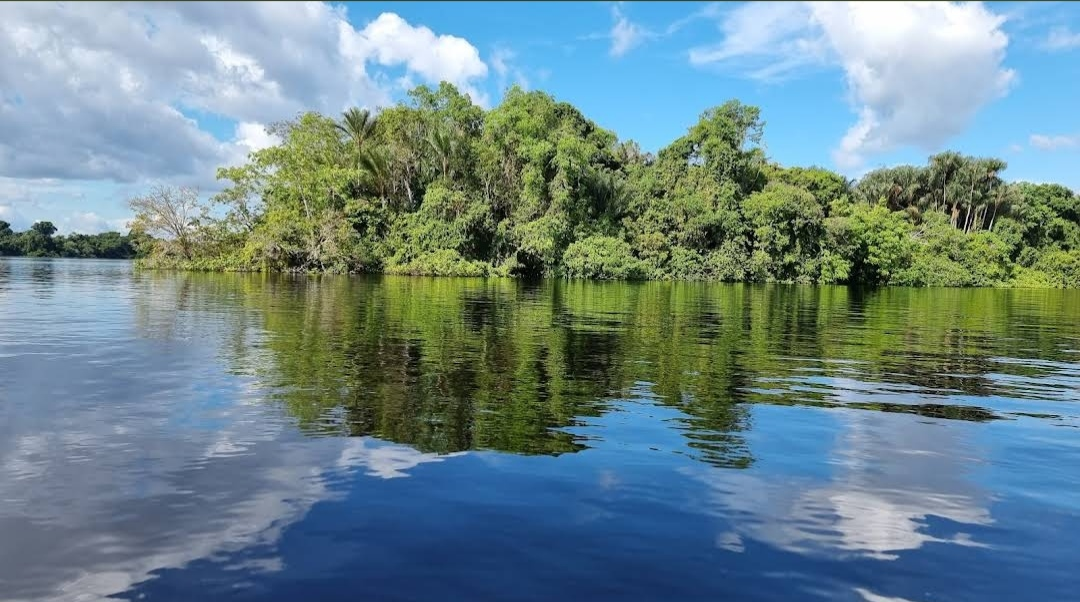
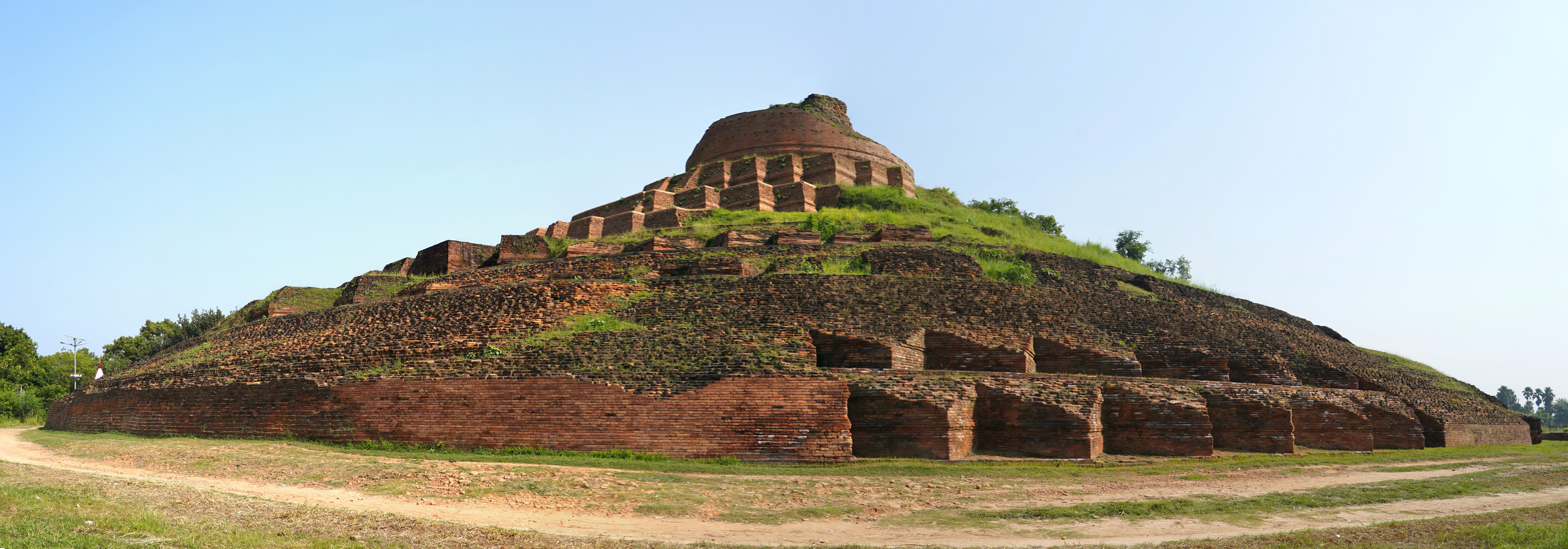
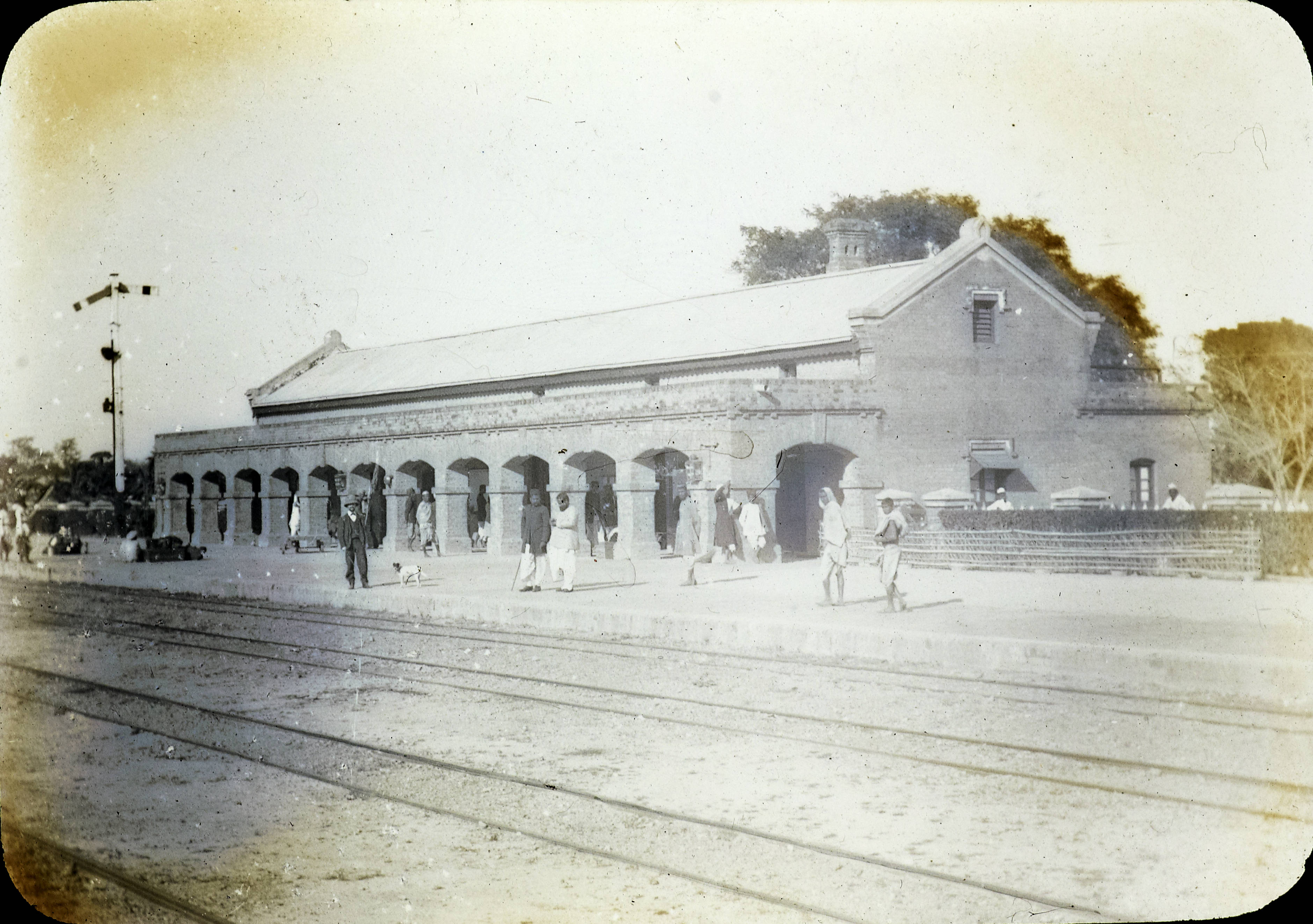
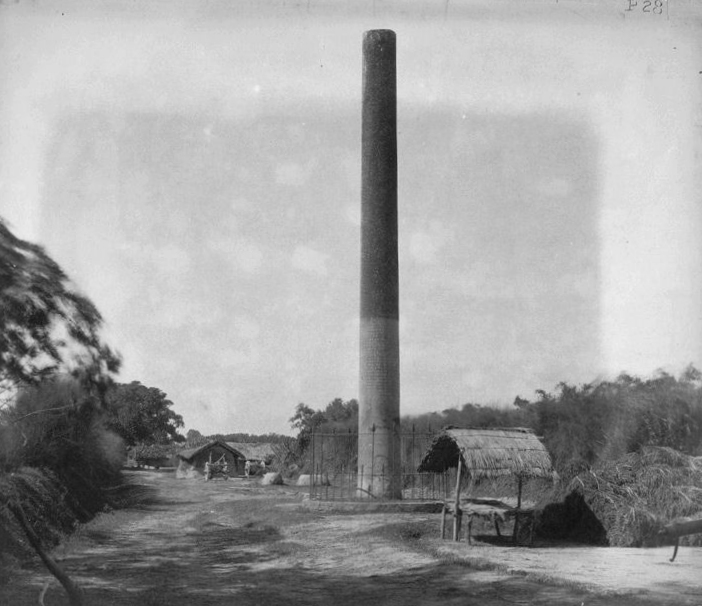
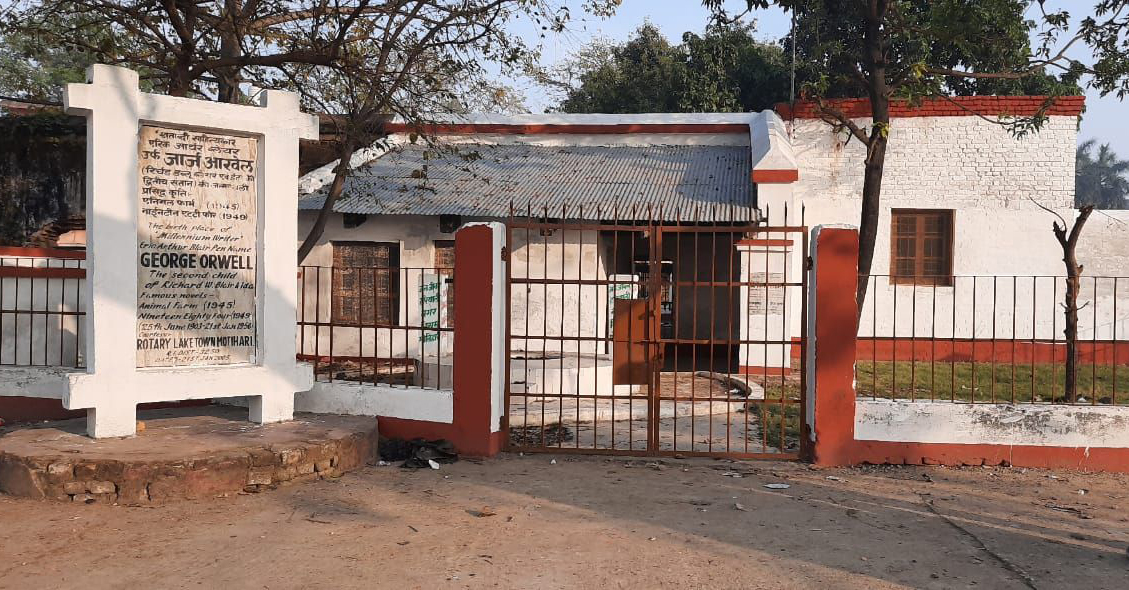
- Clockwise from top: Bhimalpur Forest, Kesariya Stupa, Lauriya Araraj pillar of Ashoka, George Orwell's birthplace, Motihari station in 1906

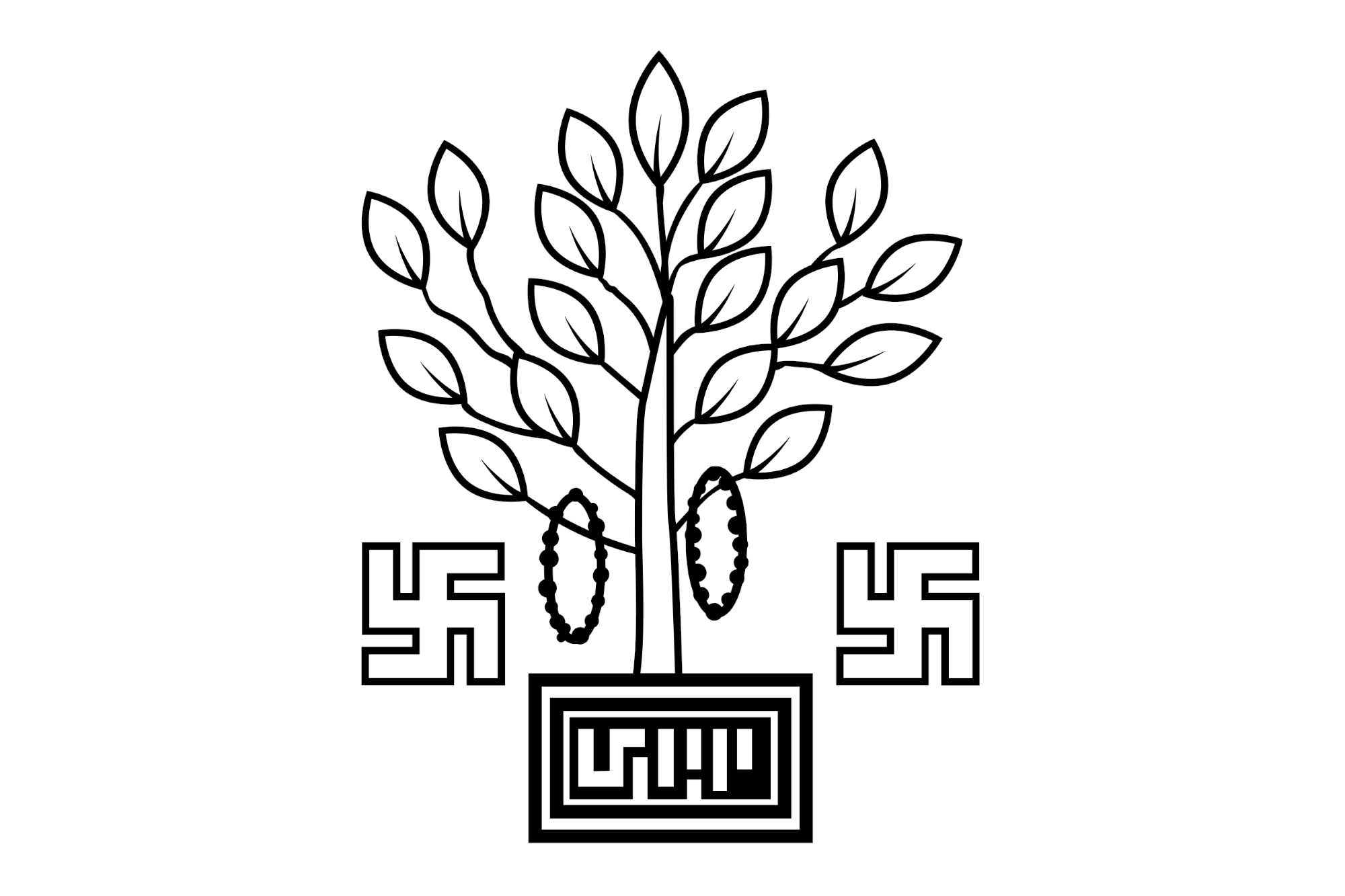
- Coat of arms

- Location of East Champaran district in Bihar
- Coordinates: 26°21′20″N 85°6′58″E
- Country: India
- State: Bihar
- Division: Tirhut
- Headquarters: Motihari

Government
  - District Magistrate (DM): Saurabh Suman Yadav (IAS)
  - Superintendent of Police (SP): Swarn Prabhat (IPS)
  - Lok Sabha constituencies: Purvi Champaran, Paschim Champaran, Sheohar
  - Vidhan Sabha constituencies: Raxaul, Sugauli, Narkatiya, Harsidhi, Govindganj, Kesaria, Kalyanpur, Pipra, Madhuban, Motihari, Chiraia, Dhaka

Area
  - Total: 3,968 km^{2} (1,532 sq mi)

Population (2011)
  - Total: 5,099,371
  - Density: 1,285/km^{2} (3,328/sq mi)

Demographics
  - Literacy: 55.79 per cent (2011)
  - Sex ratio: 901

Language
  - Official: Hindi
  - Additional official: Urdu
  - Regional: Bhojpuri
- Time zone: UTC+05:30 (IST)
- PIN: 845401 (East Champaran)
- Vehicle registration: BR-05
- Major highways: NH 527C; NH 527D
- Average annual precipitation: 1241 mm
- Website: eastchamparan.nic.in

East Champaran district, or Purvi Champaran district is an administrative district in the Tirhut division of the state of Bihar in India. The district headquarter is located at Motihari. Prior to 1971, there was a single Champaran District. On 1 December 1971, it was divided into East and West Champaran (Purvi and Paschimi Champaran). In early days the land of East Chamapran was ruled by different kingdoms as Videha, Sunga, Kanvas. It is also believed that Champaran used to be a major part of King Janak's empire. Mahatma Gandhi started his famous Satyagraha movement from here.

== About district ==
East Champaran District is functioning from 2 November 1972. The headquarter of the district is at Motihari. It is situated at 26° 16′ to 27° 1′ North latitude and 84° 30′ to 85° 16′ East longitudes. Nepal makes its northern boundary, Sitamarhi and Sheohar eastern while Muzaffarpur South and with part of Gopalganj and West Champaran bounds it in western side.

The district occupies an area of 3,969 km^{2} (1,532 sq mi) and has a population of 5,099,371 (as of 2011). East Champaran is a part of Tirhut Division. It was earlier part of the Red Corridor.

As of 2011, it is the second most populous district of Bihar (out of 38), after Patna.

East Champaran is the second most crowded district of Bihar. The district gets its name from the union of two words, champa and aranya. Champa alludes to scented blossom trees and Aranya alludes to the home or an encased spot. The name began back in when the district was encircled by a backwoods of magnolia (champa) trees.

== Geography ==
The East Champaran district occupies an area of 3,968 square kilometres (1,532 sq mi), comparatively equivalent to Vanuatu's Espiritu Santo. Gandak, Burhi Gandak and Baghmati are important rivers flowing through this region.

== Demographics ==
Historical population
Year	Pop.	±% p.a.
1901	1,027,835	—
1911	1,095,530	+0.64%
1921	1,114,162	+0.17%
1931	1,231,756	+1.01%
1941	1,376,352	+1.12%
1951	1,443,961	+0.48%
1961	1,681,089	+1.53%
1971	1,956,084	+1.53%
1981	2,425,501	+2.17%
1991	3,043,061	+2.29%
2001	3,939,773	+2.62%
2011	5,099,371	+2.61%

Religions in East Champaran district (2011)
Religion	Percent
Hinduism	80.14%
Islam	19.42%
Other or not stated	0.44%

According to the 2011 census East Champaran district has a population of 5,099,371, roughly equal to the United Arab Emirates or the US state of Colorado. This gives it a ranking of 21st in India (out of a total of 640). The district has a population density of 1,281 inhabitants per square kilometre (3,320/sq mi). Its population growth rate over the decade 2001–2011 was 29.01%. East Champaran has a sex ratio of 901 females for every 1000 males, and a literacy rate of 55.79%. 7.87% of the population lives in urban areas. Scheduled Castes and Scheduled Tribes make up 12.74% and 0.24% of the population respectively.

=== Languages ===
Languages in East Champaran district (2011)
1. Bhojpuri (82.7%)
2. Urdu (7.33%)
3. Hindi (7.06%)
4. 'Other' Hindi (2.58%)
5. Bengali (0.26%)
6. Others (0.10%)

According to the 2011 census, 82.67% of the population spoke Bhojpuri, 7.33% Urdu and 7.06% Hindi as their first language. 2.58% of the population spoke 'Others' under Hindi. The eastern border of the district lies in a transition between Bhojpuri and Bajjika.

== Administrative divisions ==
The East Champaran district is divided into 6 Tehsil (sub-division):

1. Areraj
2. Chakia
3. Motihari
4. Pakaridayal
5. Raxaul
6. Sikarahana

=== Urban development ===
The rapidly developing urban centres of East Champaran district include Raxaul, Mehsi and Motihari, which serves as the district headquarters. These towns have emerged as important centres of trade, transport, education, municipal administration, and regional connectivity in northern Bihar.

Motihari is centrally located among these urban centres and functions as the administrative headquarters of the district.

Mehsi is considered an important commercial and transport hub in the district and is located at 26°21′28″N 85°6′48″E.

== Politics ==
District	No.	Constituency	Name	Party	Alliance	Remarks
East Champaran	10	Raxaul	Pramod Kumar Sinha	BJP	NDA	
East Champaran	11	Sugauli	Rajesh Kumar	LJP(RV)	NDA	
East Champaran	12	Narkatiya	Vishal Kumar	JD(U)	NDA	
East Champaran	13	Harsidhi (SC)	Krishnanandan Paswan	BJP	NDA	
East Champaran	14	Govindganj	Raju Tiwari	LJP(RV)	NDA	
East Champaran	15	Kesaria	Shalini Mishra	JD(U)	NDA	
East Champaran	16	Kalyanpur	Sachindra Prasad Singh	BJP	NDA	
East Champaran	17	Pipra	Shyambabu Prasad Yadav	BJP	NDA	
East Champaran	18	Madhuban	Rana Randhir Singh	BJP	NDA	
East Champaran	19	Motihari	Pramod Kumar	BJP	NDA	Minister
East Champaran	20	Chiraia	Lal Babu Prasad Gupta	BJP	NDA	
East Champaran	21	Dhaka	Faisal Rahman	RJD	MGB	

== Literature ==
Ramesh Chandra Jha was the first person to record the literary history of Champaran. His notable works include Champaran Ki Sahitya Sadhana (चम्पारन की साहित्य साधना) (1958), Champaran: Literature & Literary Writers (चम्पारन: साहित्य और साहित्यकार) (1967) and Apne Aur Sapne:A Literary Journey Of Champaran (अपने और सपने: चम्पारन की साहित्य यात्रा) (1988).

== Notable places ==
=== Bhimalpur Forest ===
Bhimalpur Forest near Mehsi

Bhimalpur Forest is an emerging eco-tourism and biodiversity site located in Bhimalpur village in Mehsi, a town in the East Champaran district of Bihar, India. The forest area lies near the Burhi Gandak River and has gained attention for its greenery, afforestation programmes, and proposed biodiversity park development.

Gandak Biodiversity Park area in Bhimalpur

The forest has been developed through plantation and environmental conservation initiatives supported by the Government of Bihar and local administrative authorities. Large-scale plantation drives were conducted in the area under afforestation campaigns, including the “Didi Ki Paudhshala” initiative, which contributed to increasing green cover and ecological restoration in the region.

Burhi Gandak River near Bhimalpur Forest

Bhimalpur Forest is known for its natural scenery, riverine environment, and biodiversity. Wildlife reported from the surrounding region includes nilgai, peafowl, jackals, and several species of migratory birds. The area is being developed as an eco-tourism destination with proposals for boating facilities, walking tracks, medicinal plant zones, nature trails, and visitor infrastructure.

Afforestation area in Bhimalpur

The forest is situated approximately 7 kilometres from Mehsi town and is considered one of the notable natural attractions of the Mehsi region. Local media reports have described the site as Bihar’s first proposed biodiversity park in a forest area near the Gandak basin.

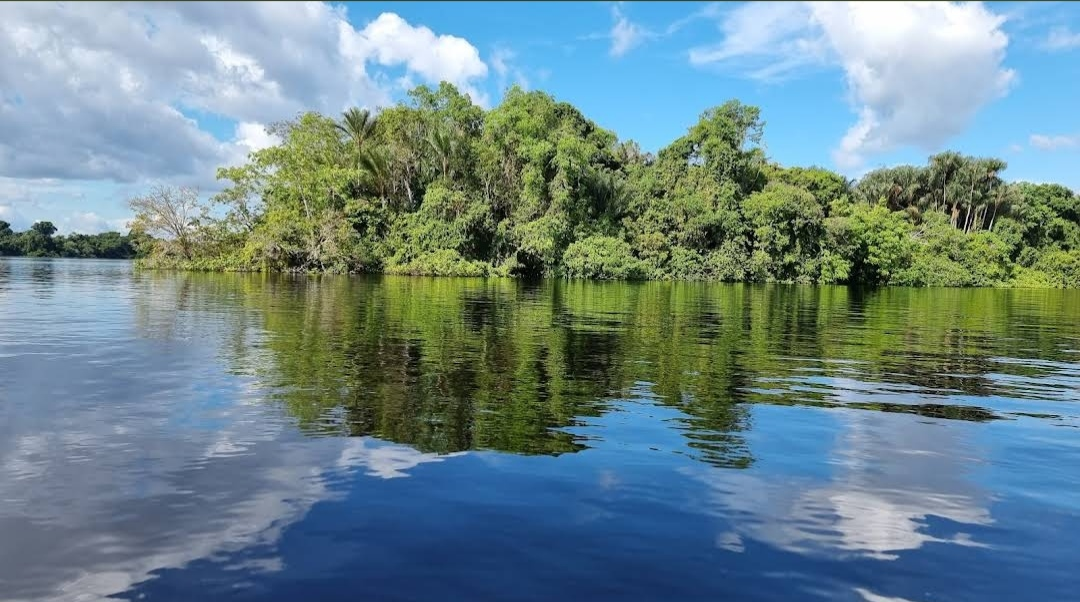
Forest landscape in Bhimalpur

=== Someshwar Nath Mandir, Areraj ===
Someshwar Nath Mahadev Mandir is a well established temple situated in Areraj. The significant divinity of the heavenly temple is of Lord Shiva. Explorers and pilgrims of Lord Shiva go to the holy place from India as well as from Nepal. The merriments on the event of an occasional reasonable known as Shrawani Mela, during July and August. There are numerous different temples nearby around and thus just Areraj is known as the holy place of East Champaran.

=== Ashokan Pillar ===
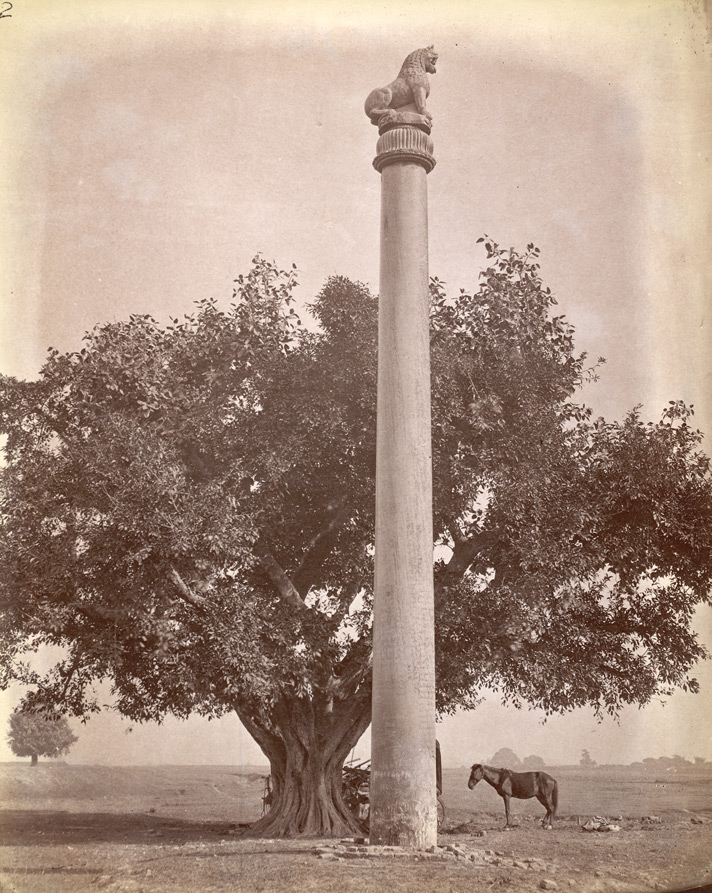
Ashoka Pillar

Ashokan Pillar is situated in Lauria Nandangarh, or Lauriya Navandgarh which is a city or town around 14 km from Narkatiaganj and 28 km from Bettiah in West Champaran district of Bihar state in northern India. It is found near the banks of the Budhi Gandak River. Lauriya Nandangarh is a chronicled place which goes under West Champaran district of Bihar.

=== Kesariya ===
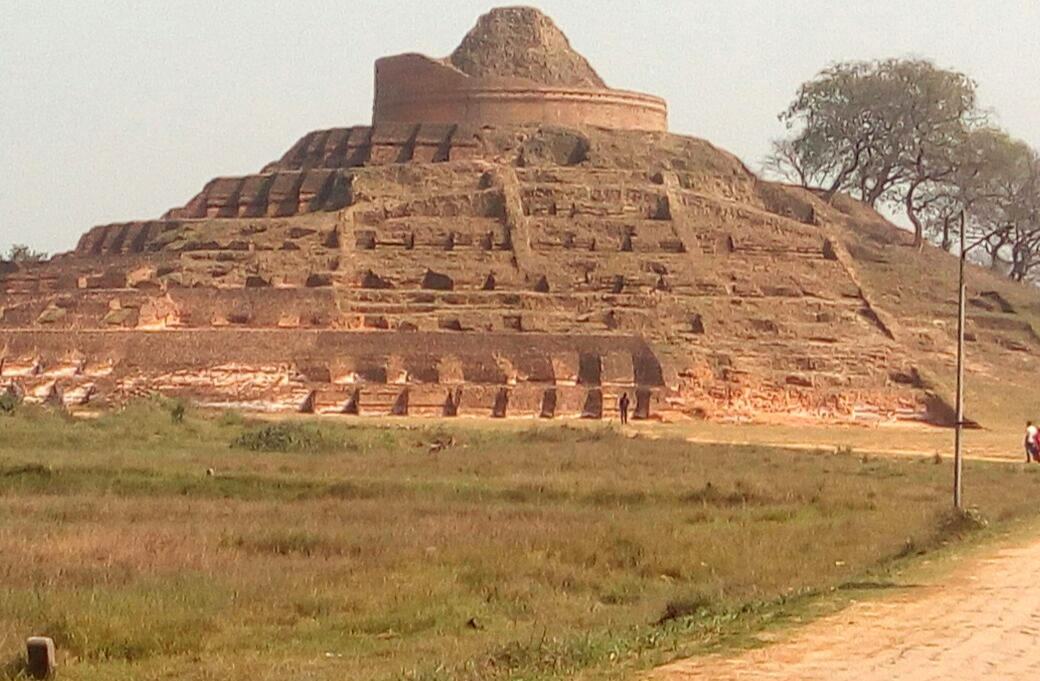
Kesariya Baudha Stupa

Kesariya is arranged on the eastern banks of the River Gandak and views the enormous 104-feet-tall stupa, which is viewed as the tallest Buddhist stupa. In like manner, Kesariya orders conspicuous situations in East Champaran the travel industry just as history of Buddhism. The stupa was found in the year 1998.

=== Gallery ===
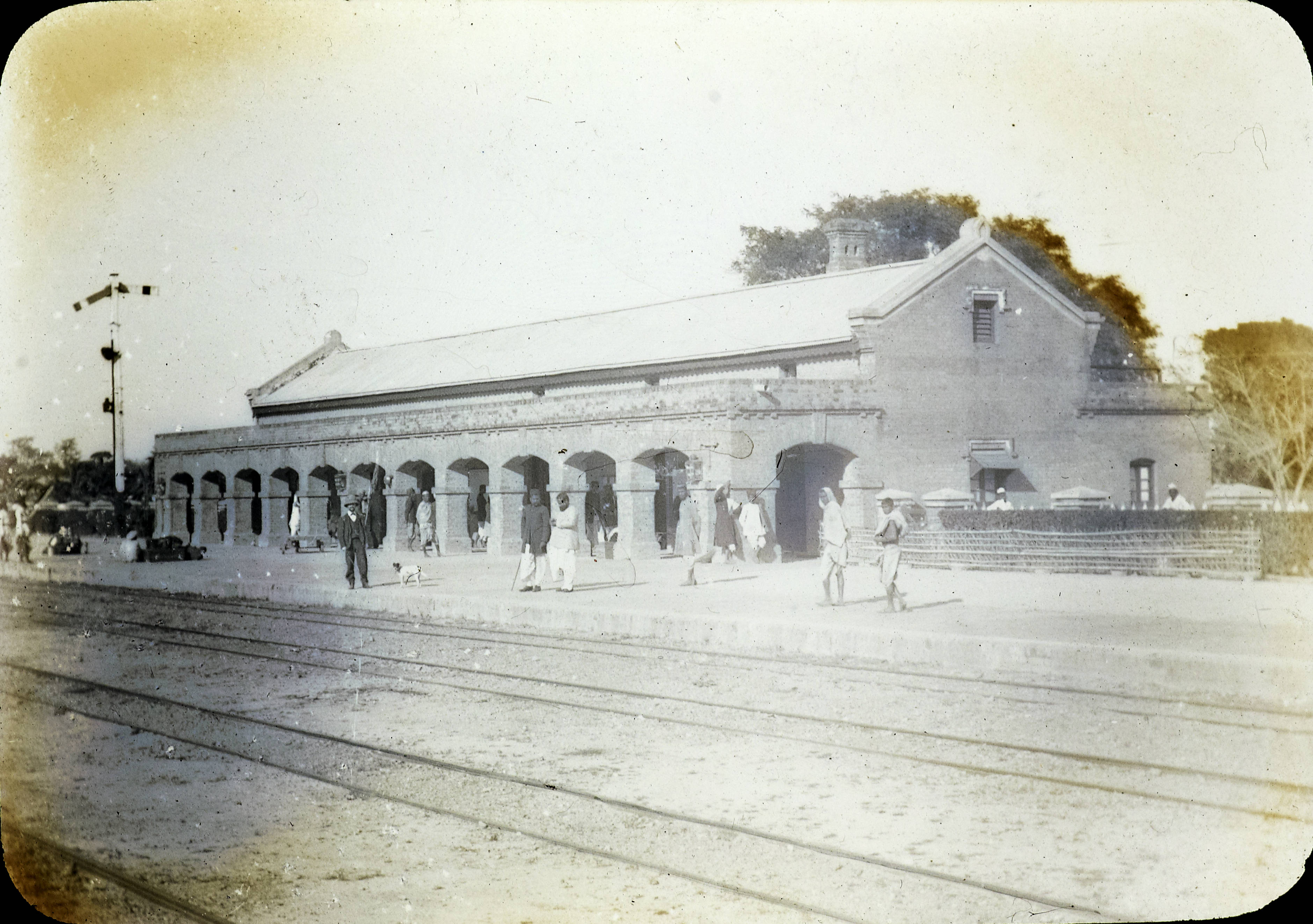
Motihari Railway Station, 1906

Henry Bazaar(1906), Motihari

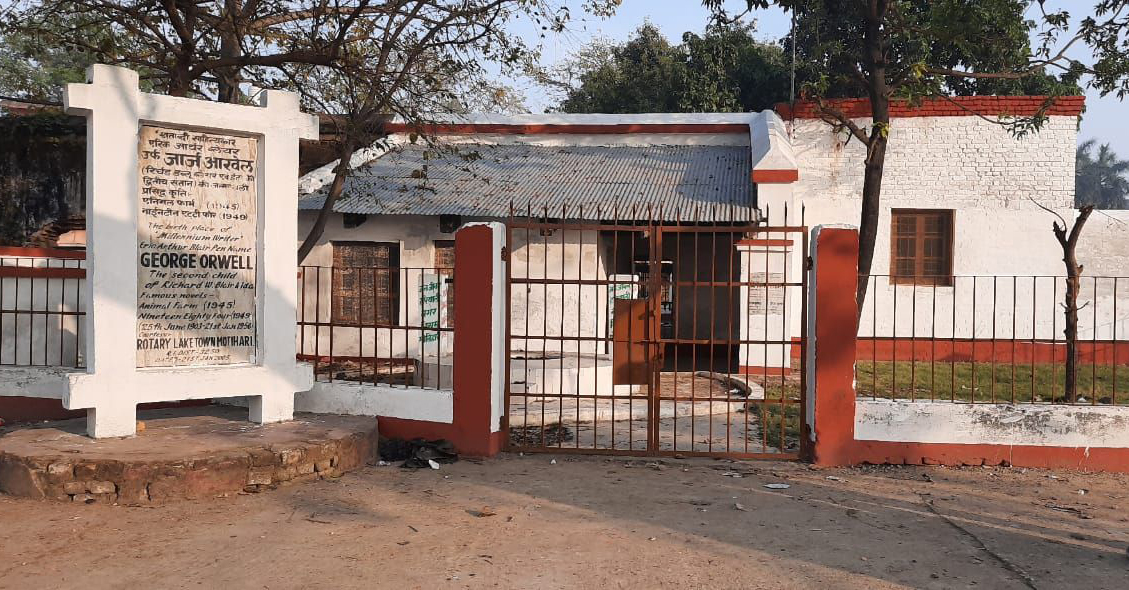
Birth palace of George Orwell, Motihari

The Prime Minister, Shri Narendra Modi paying homage at the statue of Mahatma Gandhi, at Motihari.

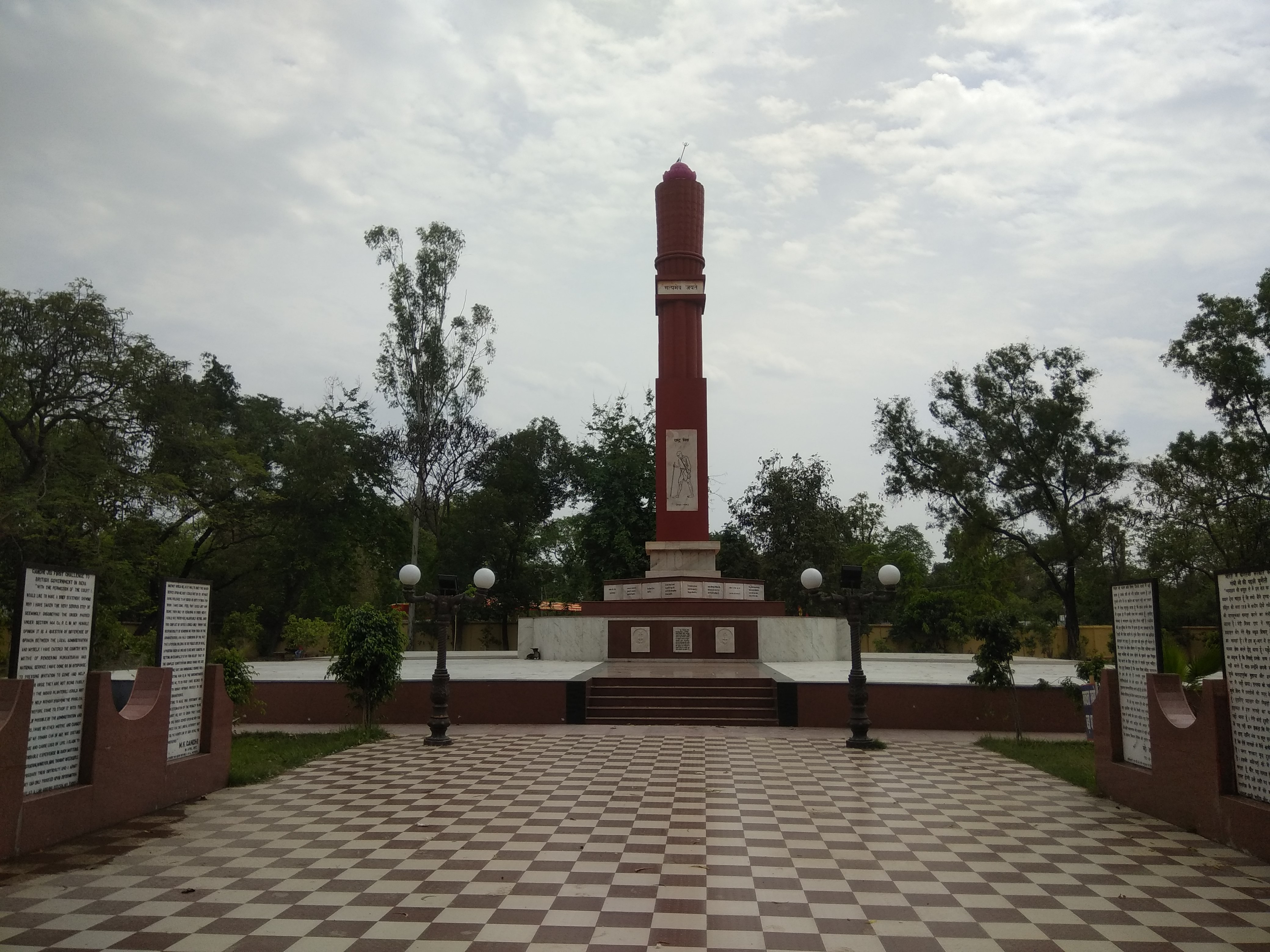
Stone Pillar Gandhi Museum

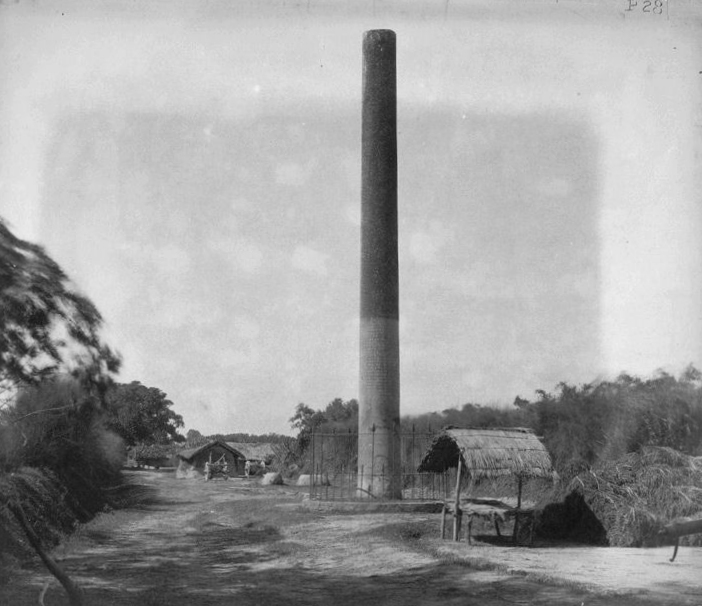
Lauriya Ashoka Pillar, Areraj

The Mosque of Naukatola, Raxaul, was approximately built between 1960-1965

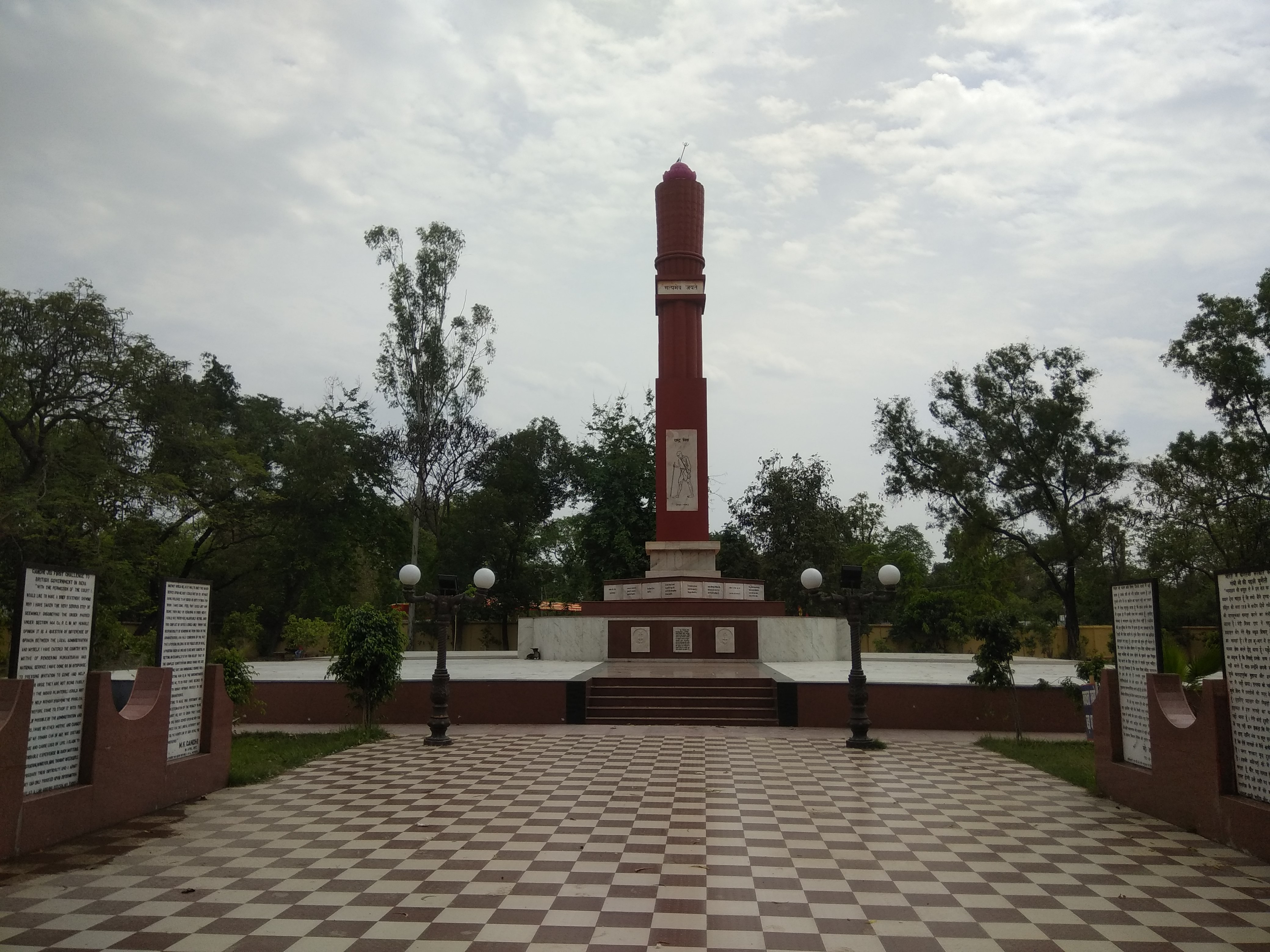
Stone pillar at the Gandhi Museum
