= Tengrari =

Tengraha is a village in Minapur Block in Muzaffarpur district of Bihar, India. It belongs to Tirhut Division. It is located 26 km north of the Muzaffarpur district headquarters, 8 km from Minapur, and 91 km from the state capital, Patna. It is surrounded by Gandak and Bagmati rivers. Most of the people in this village are farmers. This village, as well as the rest of Muzaffarpur district, is famous for its Lichee trees, which grow litchis fruit. Tengrari has a small shopping market. Balua Bazar is near Tengrari, which has a shopping market and Rishabh Vastralaya.

== Highway ==
DMR Highway

- Terminal= Mehsi, Tegrari

Connected bridge= Semra ghat bridge

- National Highway 527C Passed

Route= Mehsi, Tengrai, Midnapur, Jhapaha

Tengrari's Pin code is 843128 and the postal head office is in Minapur.

== Nearby locations ==
Ghosaut (4 km), Harsher ghat (3 km), Balua Bazar (2 km), Rani Khaira Urf Banua (5 km), Belahi Lachhi (5 km), Raghai (6 km), and Harka Man Shahi (6 km) are the villages near to Tengrari. Tengrari is surrounded by Kanti Block towards the south, Tariyani Block towards the north, Motipur Block towards the west, Mehsi Block towards west.

Kanti, Mehsi, Muzaffarpur, Sheohar are the cities near Tengrari.

This place is in the border of the Muzaffarpur district and Sheohar district. Sheohar district's Tariyani is to the north.

== Demographics of Tengrari ==
Maithili is the local language.

== Transport ==
=== By rail ===
The nearest railway station is Mehsi railway station, located about 11 km from Tengrari.

=== By road ===
Tengrari is situated on NH 527C, providing direct road connectivity to Mehsi, Muzaffarpur, Pupri and other nearby towns.

== Temples ==
- Ram Sita Mandir

== Colleges near Tengrari ==
- Ramjanki College (Address : Jajuar. badipokhar.ramjanki Religious Place)
- Mahatma Gandhi College (Address: Dakbangla chowk, Mohabbat Chhapra in Mehsi)
- Alliance Industrial Training Centre (Address : Holding No 152, near Banaras Bank Chowk, pakki Sarai, muzaffarpur Bihar)
- North Bihar Institute Of Technology (Address : N.h.-- 28. B.b. Goni; Muzaffarpurbihar—842001
- Muzaffarpur Institute Of Technology, muzaffarpur (Address :Daudpur Kothi, Muzaffarpur, Bihar 842001)
- Vaishali Institute Of Business & Rural Management (Address : Narayanpur Anant Rd; Nearby Mithanpura Chowk; Ramna; Muzaffarpur; Bihar)

== Schools in Tengrari ==
- R.K.S.D. High School (Address : tengrari, minapur, muzaffarpur, Bihar. PIN- 843128, Post - Minapur)
