= Motipur =

Motipur may refer to:

== India ==
- Motipur, Muzaffarpur, Bihar
  - Motipur railway station
- Motipur, Punjab

== Nepal ==
- Motipur, Bardiya
- Motipur, Kapilvastu
- Motipur, Morang
- Motipur, Rupandehi
- Motipur, Sarlahi
