= Dora Chapara =

- village
- Country: India
- State: Bihar

Languages
  - Official: Maithili, Hindi
- Time zone: UTC+5:30 (IST)
- ISO 3166 code: IN-BR

Dora Chapara (called Donra Chapra in the official website of Muzaffarpur district) is a small village in Bihar state, India, which mainly relies on farming and agriculture. It falls under Kathaiyan thana (Police station). It is in Fatehan Panchyat and Baruraj Legislative Seat. It falls under the Vaishali parliamentary seat. Nearest Railway station is Motipur.

As per 1991 census, its population was 759 (409 male and 350 females) and 231 people with literacy and 112 house holds. But as of 2008, its population is around 2000 and literacy at 60% and number of present households above 250.

This village heavily relies on farming. Until the early 1990s the main crop was sugar cane. With the closure of Motipur Sugar mill and conditions not suitable for farming people have migrated to different parts of the country in search of livelihood and work. Most of the working men had moved toward big industrial areas mainly Delhi, Kolkata, Gujarat, Daman,.

== Education ==
There is one government primary school at place named Maisthan (worship place of mother durga).

Another school is being opened by Kerala mission on Main Chowk.
