= Harpur Nag Halt railway station =

Railway station in Bihar, India

Harpur Nag Halt

General information
- Location: National Highway 28, Harpur Nag, in Mehsi, Bihar; India
- Coordinates: 26°23′11″N 85°04′38″E
- Elevation: 67 m (220 ft)
- System: Passenger train station
- Owner: Indian Railways
- Operator: East Central Railway
- Line: Muzaffarpur–Gorakhpur main line
- Platforms: 1
- Tracks: 2

Construction
- Structure type: Standard (on ground station)

Other information
- Status: Active
- Station code: HRNG
- Zone(s): East Central Railway zone
- Division(s): Samastipur

History
- Opened: 1930s

Services
Preceding station	Indian Railways	Following station
Chakia towards ?	East Central Railway zone Muzaffarpur–Gorakhpur main line	Mehsi towards ?
Location

Harpur Nag Halt railway station (station code: HRNG), is a halt railway station on Muzaffarpur–Gorakhpur main line under the Samastipur railway division of East Central Railway zone. This is situated beside National Highway 28 at Harpur Nag in East Champaran district of the Indian state of Bihar.
