= West Bengal district income estimates =

Districts of West Bengal

As of 2024-25, West Bengal has reached a GDP of INR 1815009.91 Crore (USD 212.08 Billion).

Government of West Bengal rarely publishes it's district income estimates. The most recent one was published in 2023 with district estimates upto 2021. The publication was a provisional one where the state GDP was revised later. Hence given district income estimates will change as per revised data according to their % shares.

For currency conversion, wikipedia inbuilt converter is not used due to the difference between financial year and calendar year. Instead, end year exchange rates provided by Reserve Bank of India is used

West Bengal district income estimates 2020-21
District	Nominal GDP (Crore INR)	Nominal GDP (billion USD)	Percapita GDP (INR)	Percapita GDP (USD)
Howrah	76172	10.05	139353	1838
Malda	42915	5.66	88751	1171
Purulia	30403	4.01	89825	1185
Birbhum	37229	4.91	91517	1207
Dakshin dinajpur	19211	2.53	102770	1356
Murshidabad	74546	9.83	86662	1143
North 24 Parganas	158142	20.86	141012	1860
South 24 Parganas	101923	13.45	105671	1394
Cooch behar	29622	3.91	92406	1219
Purba Medinipur	98479	12.99	168704	2225
Paschim Bardhaman + Purba Bardhaman	143985	18.99	166697	2199
Kolkata	108824	14.36	246110	3247
Hoogly	82783	10.92	137025	1808
Uttar Dinajpur	26309	3.47	71040	937
Paschim Medinipur + Jhargram	72423	9.55	132366	1746
Alipurduar + Jalpaiguri	50640	6.68	114832	1515
Bankura	43569	5.75	107530	1419
Darjeeling + Kalimpong	37714	4.98	177932	2347
Nadia	66123	8.72	114023	1504
West Bengal	1301012	171.62	132932	1754

== Related pages ==
1. Tamil Nadu district income estimates
2. Andhra Pradesh district income estimates
3. Bihar district income estimates
