= Tirhut division =

Administrative division in Bihar, India

- Division
- Etymology: Tirhut (One of the twelve names of Mithila as per Brihada Vishnu Purana)
- Interactive map of Tirhut division
- Coordinates: 26°21′16″N 85°06′36″E
- Country: India
- State: Bihar
- Region: Mithila region(North Bihar)
- Established: 1908
- Headquarters: Muzaffarpur
- Districts: Vaishali; Sheohar; Sitamarhi; Muzaffarpur; East Champaran; West Champaran

Government
  - Divisional Commissioner: Giriwar Dayal Singh, I.A.S.

Area
  - Total: 17,141 km^{2} (6,618 sq mi)

Population (2011)
  - Total: 21,410,544
- Website: Official website

Tirhut Division is an administrative division of the Indian state of Bihar, headquartered in Muzaffarpur. The division was created in 1908 and comprises six districts: Muzaffarpur, East Champaran, West Champaran, Vaishali, Sitamarhi, and Sheohar. Tirhut Division is part of the Mithila region.

According to the 2011 census, the division covers an area of 17,141 square kilometres and had a population of 21,410,544.

== Districts ==
Map of Tirhut Division in Bihar, India

Districts of Tirhut Division, Bihar
District	Headquarters	Cities and towns	Blocks	Population (2011)	Creation date
Muzaffarpur	Muzaffarpur	Muzaffarpur, Kanti, Motipur, Sahebganj, Saraiya	Aurai, Bandra, Bochahan, Gaighat, Katra, Minapur, Muraul, Mushahari, Paroo, Sahebganj, Sakra, Saraiya, Kanti, Kurhani, Marwan, Motipur	4,801,062	1875
East Champaran	Motihari	Motihari, Mehsi, Raxaul, Dhaka	Adapur, Areraj, Banjaria, Chakia, Chiraiya, Dhaka, Ghorasahan, Harsidhi, Kesaria, Kotwa, Madhuban, Mehsi, Motihari, Paharpur, Pakaridayal, Phenhara, Patahi, Raxaul, Sugauli, Tetaria, Turkaulia	5,099,371	1972
West Champaran	Bettiah	Bettiah, Bagaha, Narkatiaganj, Ramnagar, Chanpatia, Lauriya	Bagaha I, Bagaha II, Bettiah, Bairia, Bhitaha, Chanpatia, Gaunaha, Jogapatti, Lauriya, Mainatand, Majhaulia, Narkatiaganj, Nautan, Piprasi, Ramnagar, Sikta, Thakrahan	3,935,042	1972
Sheohar	Sheohar	Sheohar	Dumri Katsari, Purnahiya, Sheohar, Piprarhi, Tariyani	656,246	1994
Sitamarhi	Sitamarhi	Sitamarhi, Pupri, Belsand, Bairgania, Riga, Sursand	Bairgania, Bajpatti, Bathnaha, Belsand, Bokhara, Choraut, Dumra, Majorganj, Nanpur, Parihar, Pupri, Riga, Runnisaidpur, Sonbarsa, Sursand, Suppi	3,423,574	1972
Vaishali	Hajipur	Hajipur, Mahnar, Mahua, Lalganj	Bhagwanpur, Bidupur, Chehra Kalan, Desari, Goraul, Hajipur, Jandaha, Lalganj, Mahnar, Mahua, Patepur, Paterhi Belsar, Raghopur, Raja Pakar, Sahdai Buzurg	3,495,021	1972

== Geography and demographics ==
Tirhut Division covers an area of 17,141 km^{2}. According to the Census of India, the division has a total population of 21,410,544 with a literacy rate of 60.81%. Administratively, it is subdivided into 18 subdivisions, 99 community development blocks, 1,788 gram panchayats, and 1,572 villages.
