= Rajadih =

Rajadih is a village in Sheohar district of Bihar state of India.
