= Sheohar =

- City
- Location in Bihar, India
- Coordinates: 26.514080°N 85.297081°E
- Country: India
- State: Bihar
- District: Sheohar district

Government
  - Type: Nagar Panchayat
  - Body: Sheohar Nagar Panchayat
- Elevation: 53 m (174 ft)

Population (2011)
  - Total: 28,116
- Time zone: UTC+5:30 (IST)

Sheohar is a city and the administrative headquarters of Sheohar district in the Indian state of Bihar.

It is part of the Tirhut Division.

== Geography ==
Sheohar is located at 26.52N, 85.3E and has an average elevation of 53 metres (174 ft).

The nearest rail station is 27 km (17 mi) away near Mehsi in East Champaran district. Mehsi railway station is on the Muzaffarpur–Gorakhpur main line, operating under the Samastipur railway division of East Central Railway zone. Services include the Sapt Kranti Express to Delhi, Mithila Express to Kolkata, Lokmanya Tilak express to Mumbai and Awadh express and Garib Rath Express, Kaswa Mehsi has direct connectivity to major Indian cities.

== Transport ==
Sheohar is connected by road to nearby towns and cities of North Bihar:

- Mehsi — approx. 31 km (19 mi)
- Motihari — district headquarters of East Champaran
- Muzaffarpur — major commercial centre

== Regional connectivity ==
The Sheohar–Mehsi–Motihari corridor forms part of the North Bihar transport network, linking agricultural and trade routes across Tirhut and Champaran regions.

== Demographics ==
According to the 2011 Census of India, Sheohar had a population of 28,116.

Hindi is the official language, while Maithili, Bajjika and Bhojpuri are widely spoken.

== See also ==
- Sheohar district
- East Champaran district
- Tirhut division
