= Bihar district income estimates =

Income estimates of districts in Indian state

Districts of Bihar

As of 2023-24, Bihar's nominal GDP has reached INR 877197 Crore with percapita GDP of INR 68624.

Directorate of Economics and statistics, Government of Bihar releases district income estimates every year in its economic survey.

For Currency conversion, financial year end exchange rates as given by Reserve Bank of India is applied.Wikipedia inbuilt currency converter is not applied due to difference between calendar year and financial year of India.

== Bihar district income estimates 2023-24 ==
Bihar district income estimates 2023-24
District	Nominal GDP in Crore INR	Nominal GDP in Billion US$	Percapita GDP in INR	Percapita GDP in US$
Patna	169836	20.37	241220	2893
Nalanda	21652	2.6	63911	767
Bhojpur	21576	2.59	67005	804
Buxar	13279	1.59	65909	791
Rohtas	25299	3.02	73067	876
Kaimur	13194	1.58	65645	787
Gaya	36593	4.39	67251	807
Jehanabad	8275	0.99	62404	749
Arwal	3910	0.47	48491	582
Narwada	12211	1.47	46150	554
Aurangabad	20514	2.46	65339	784
Saran	23971	2.88	51389	616
Siwan	22437	2.69	56459	677
Gopalganj	14120	1.69	47993	576
West Champaran	24850	2.98	49547	594
East Champaran	29281	3.51	44992	540
Muzaffarpur	43004	5.16	71075	853
Sitamarhi	17853	2.14	41593	499
Sheohar	3131	0.38	38214	458
Vaishali	25208	3.02	56993	684
Darbhanga	28601	3.43	62956	755
Madhubani	24234	2.91	43986	528
Samastipur	27759	3.33	53043	636
Begusarai	38873	4.66	105600	1267
Munger	14939	1.79	93921	1127
Sheikhpura	3889	0.47	52071	625
Lakhisarai	7718	0.93	73276	879
Jamui	11486	1.38	52959	635
Khagaria	11971	1.44	55861	670
Bhagalpur	32203	3.86	86470	1037
Banka	14088	1.68	55848	670
Sahasra	12985	1.56	55361	664
Supaul	13558	1.63	48019	576
Madhepura	12742	1.53	49069	589
Purnea	23085	2.77	56006	672
Kishanganj	11702	1.4	53797	645
Araria	15962	1.92	44134	529
Katihar	21209	2.54	54687	656
Bihar	877197	105.2	68624	823

== Bihar district income estimates 2022-23 ==
Bihar district income estimates 2022-23
District	Nominal GDP in Crore INR	Nominal GDP in Billion US$	Percapita GDP in INR	Percapita GDP in US$
Patna	149456	18.18	215049	2616
Nalanda	18263	2.22	54510	663
Bhojpur	17810	2.17	55936	680
Buxar	10645	1.3	53438	650
Rohtas	21205	2.58	61893	753
Kaimur	10354	1.26	52290	636
Gaya	20563	2.5	55160	671
Jehanabad	6757	0.82	51526	627
Arwal	3309	0.4	41421	504
Narwada	10521	1.32	40247	490
Aurangabad	17004	2.07	54977	669
Saran	19851	2.42	43039	524
Siwan	18320	2.23	46663	568
Gopalganj	11781	1.43	40410	492
West Champaran	21799	2.65	44228	538
East Champaran	25340	3.08	39623	482
Muzaffarpur	35367	4.3	59425	723
Sitamarhi	15498	1.89	36692	446
Sheohar	2694	0.33	33399	406
Vaishali	22312	2.71	51302	624
Darbhanga	23757	2.89	52792	642
Madhubani	21183	2.58	39006	474
Samastipur	24143	2.94	46803	569
Begusarai	30558	3.72	84279	1025
Munger	12482	1.52	79272	964
Sheikhpura	3286	0.4	44484	541
Lakhisarai	6064	0.74	50406	613
Jamui	10038	1.22	46969	571
Khagaria	9596	1.17	45596	555
Bhagalpur	20543	2.5	50471	614
Banka	10677	1.3	42974	523
Sahasra	10780	1.31	46643	567
Supaul	11713	1.42	42192	513
Madhepura	11750	1.42	46107	561
Purnea	18735	2.23	46216	562
Kishanganj	10228	1.24	47831	582
Araria	14814	1.8	41707	507
Katihar	19221	2.34	50393	613
Bihar	746417	90.79	59244	721

== Related articles ==
1. Andhra Pradesh district income estimates
2. Tamil Nadu district income estimates
