= Andhra Pradesh district income estimates =

Andhra Pradesh consists of 26 districts. As of 2023-24, Andhra Pradesh Nominal GDP reached INR 14,22,094 Crore with percapita GDP INR 2,66,995.

Department of Economics and statistics, Government of Andhra Pradesh releases district income estimates every year.

Districts of AndhraPradesh

For Currency conversion, financial year end exchange rates as given by Reserve Bank of India is applied.Wikipedia inbuilt currency converter is not applied due to difference between calendar year and financial year of India.

Andhra Pradesh District Income Estimates 2023-24.
| District | Nominal GDP (2023–24) in Crore INR | GDP (2023–24) in Billion US$ | Percapita GDP (2023–24) in INR | Percapita GDP (2023–24) in US$ |
|---|---|---|---|---|
| Srikakulam | 37441 | 4.49 | 159029 | 1907 |
| Vizianagaram | 35652 | 4.28 | 171869 | 2061 |
| Parvathipuram Manyam | 16006 | 1.92 | 161004 | 1931 |
| Alluri Sitharama Raju | 17044 | 2.04 | 166302 | 1995 |
| Visakhapatnam | 114859 | 13.78 | 545588 | 6544 |
| Anakapalli | 51500 | 6.18 | 277571 | 3329 |
| Kakinada | 61336 | 7.36 | 272864 | 3723 |
| Dr. B. R. Ambedkar Kona Seema | 42194 | 5.06 | 228458 | 2740 |
| East Godavari | 56469 | 6.77 | 286854 | 3441 |
| West Godavari | 59628 | 7.15 | 300836 | 3608 |
| Eluru | 72314 | 8.67 | 335425 | 4023 |
| Krishna | 78639 | 9.43 | 421866 | 5060 |
| NTR Vijayawada | 85892 | 10.3 | 360354 | 4322 |
| Guntur | 68334 | 8.2 | 304175 | 3648 |
| Bapatla | 41344 | 4.96 | 242502 | 2909 |
| Palnadu | 42836 | 5.14 | 195282 | 2342 |
| Prakasam | 50942 | 6.11 | 207240 | 2486 |
| Sri Potti Sriramulu Nellore | 69491 | 8.34 | 261901 | 3141 |
| Kurnool | 47362 | 5.68 | 194061 | 2328 |
| Nandyal | 38734 | 4.65 | 202343 | 2427 |
| Ananthapuramu | 62978 | 7.55 | 261566 | 3137 |
| Sri Sathyasai | 52369 | 6.28 | 264913 | 3177 |
| Y.S.R Kadapa | 55429 | 6.65 | 250373 | 3003 |
| Annamayya | 36613 | 4.39 | 200783 | 2408 |
| Chittoor | 45071 | 5.41 | 223980 | 2687 |
| Tirupati | 81619 | 9.79 | 345792 | 4148 |
| Andhra Pradesh | 1422094 | 170.57 | 266995 | 3202 |

== Related Articles ==
1. Tamil Nadu district income estimates
2. Bihar district income estimates
3. West Bengal district income estimates
