= Nand Lal Chaudhary =

Indian politician (c.1936–2020)

Bihar Legislative Assembly
- In office 1980–1990
- Preceded by: Tulsi Ram
- Succeeded by: Sahdev Paswan
- Constituency: Pipra, Purvi Champaran

Personal details
- Born: c. 1936 Mehsi, Bihar
- Died: 14 January 2020 (aged 84)
- Party: Indian National Congress

Nand Lal Chaudhary (c. 1936 – 14 January 2020) was an Indian politician from Bihar belonging to Indian National Congress. He was elected twice as a legislator of the Bihar Legislative Assembly. He also served as the president of East Champaran unit of Indian National Congress from 1995 to 2005.

== Biography ==
Chaudhary was elected as a legislator of the Bihar Legislative Assembly from Pipra, Purvi Champaran in 1980. He was also elected from this constituency in 1985. He served as the president of East Champaran unit of Indian National Congress from 1995 to 2005.

Chaudhary died on 14 January 2020 at the age of 84.
