= Kanti, Muzaffarpur =

Kanti
- Municipality
- Interactive map of Kanti
- Location in Bihar, India Kanti (India)
- Coordinates: 26.2167°N 85.3000°E
- Country: India
- State: Bihar
- District: Muzaffarpur

Government
  - MLA: Mohammad Israil Mansuri
  - Member of Parliament: Veena Devi

Population (2001)
  - Total: 20,873

Languages
  - Official: Hindi
- Time zone: UTC+5:30 (IST)
- Postal code: 843109
- ISO 3166 code: IN-BR
- Lok Sabha constituency: Vaishali
- Vidhan Sabha constituency: Kanti
- Civic agency: Kanti Nagar Parishad

Kanti is a town and a notified area in Muzaffarpur district in the Indian state of Bihar. It is also a block headquarters belongs to Tirhut division. It is located 15km by road from district headquarters located in Muzaffarpur. Kanti holds a distinct history for it was a spot for indigo production. Kanti was once a site for saltpeter production. In 2022, Kanti Nagar Panchayat was upgraded to Nagar Parishad (Municipal Council). The PIN (Postal Index Number) code of this location is 843109.

== Transportation ==
Kanti is connected by rail and Kanti railway station is situated on Muzaffarpur–Gorakhpur main line. It is 13 km by railway from Muzaffarpur Junction and 4 km from Piprahan.

== Demographics ==
As of 2011 India census, Kanti had a population of 272,858. Males constitute 53% of the population and females 47%. Kanti has an average literacy rate of 66.68%, lower than the national average of 74.04%: male literacy is 61.01%, and female literacy is 48.27%. In Kanti, 17.54% of the population is under 6 years of age.
