= Tamil Nadu district income estimates =

Income estimates of districts in Indian state

Districts of Tamil Nadu

Tamil Nadu GDP as of 2023-24 is INR 26,88,963 Crore with percapita GDP of INR 3,49,248. Tamil Nadu state consists of 38 districts. Department of Economics and statistics, Government of Tamil Nadu releases district income estimates every year.

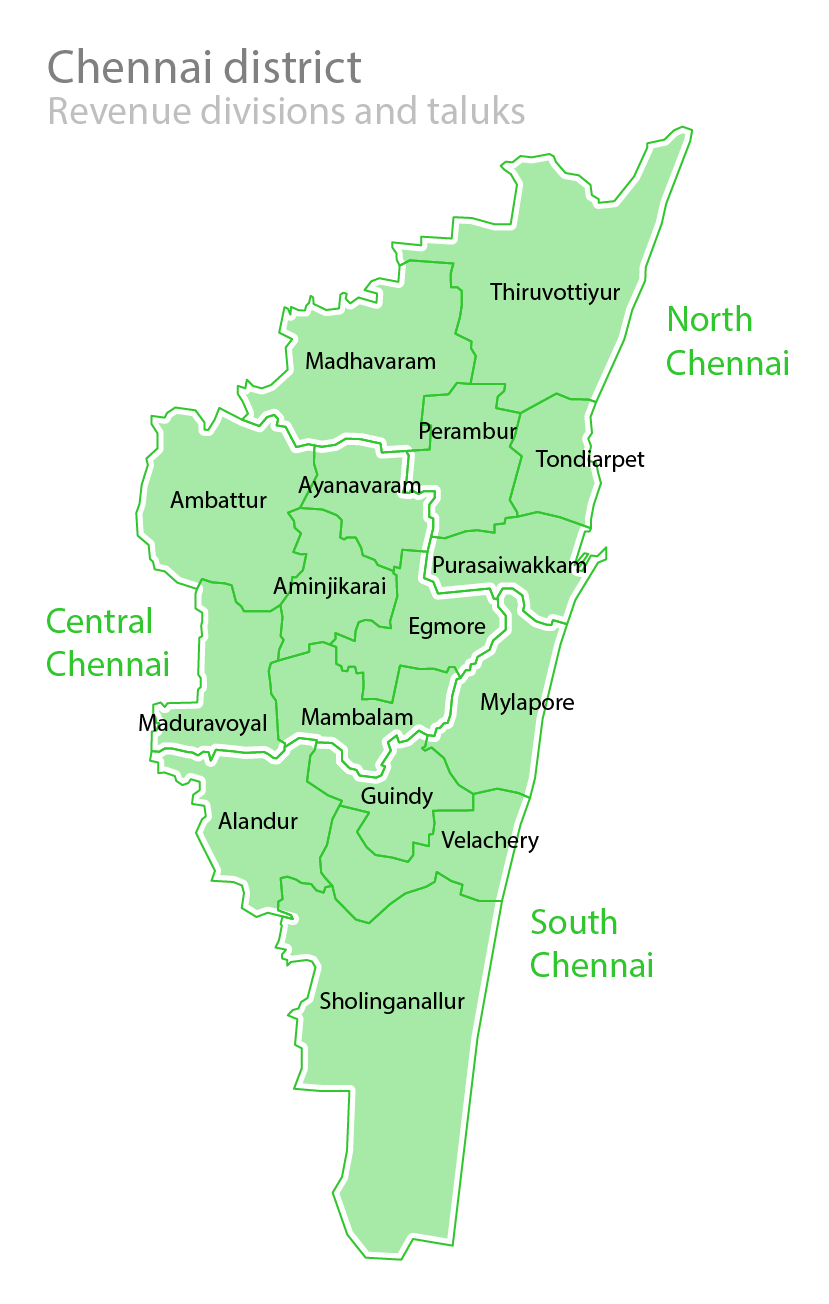
Taluks of Chennai district

In below data Chennai district denotes old Chennai (175 km^{2}) and data of extended parts of Chennai is included in neighbouring districts i.e., Alandur, Sholinganallur taluks is included in Chengalpattu district and Thiruvottiyur, Madhavaram, Ambattur, Maduravoyal taluks is included in Thiruvallur district for administrative convenience. Overall Chennai Urban Agglomeration which is combination of four districts Chennai, Thiruvallur, Kanchipuram and Chengalpattu produced a GDP of US$102.1 Billion Contributing 31.66% to state's economy.

For Currency conversion, financial year end exchange rates as given by Reserve Bank of India is applied. Wikipedia inbuilt currency converter is not applied due to difference between calendar year and financial year of India.

Tamil Nadu district income estimates 2023-24
| District | Nominal GDP (Lakhs INR) | Nominal GDP (Billion US$) | Percapita GDP (INR) | Percapita GDP (US$) |
|---|---|---|---|---|
| Chennai | 32044952 | 38.44 | 646218 | 7751 |
| Kanchipuram | 10513879 | 12.61 | 844661 | 10131 |
| Chengalpattu | 23315269 | 27.97 | 854684 | 10251 |
| Thiruvallur | 19250476 | 23.09 | 483861 | 5804 |
| Vellore | 4641778 | 5.57 | 269453 | 3232 |
| Tirupathur | 3256137 | 3.91 | 274434 | 3292 |
| Ranipet | 3422303 | 4.11 | 264973 | 3178 |
| Tiruvannamalai | 6107425 | 7.33 | 232183 | 2785 |
| Cuddalore | 6079468 | 7.29 | 218611 | 2622 |
| Villupuram | 4104263 | 4.92 | 183752 | 2204 |
| Kallakurichi | 3005078 | 3.6 | 205501 | 2465 |
| Thanjavur | 5646676 | 6.77 | 219930 | 2638 |
| Nagapattinam | 1625353 | 1.95 | 218173 | 2617 |
| Mayiladuthurai | 2012868 | 2.41 | 205386 | 2463 |
| Thiruvarur | 2404310 | 2.88 | 178203 | 2137 |
| Salem | 10390092 | 12.46 | 279609 | 3354 |
| Namakkal | 9300229 | 11.16 | 504741 | 6054 |
| Dharmapuri | 4851481 | 5.82 | 301699 | 3619 |
| Krishnagiri | 8584122 | 10.3 | 427907 | 5132 |
| The Nilgiris | 1760029 | 2.11 | 224268 | 2690 |
| Tiruchirapalli | 8416693 | 10.1 | 289717 | 3475 |
| Karur | 3012789 | 3.61 | 265212 | 3181 |
| Perambalur | 1073051 | 1.29 | 177897 | 2134 |
| Ariyalur | 1579183 | 1.9 | 196026 | 2351 |
| Pudukkottai | 3632741 | 4.36 | 210344 | 2523 |
| Coimbatore | 16827767 | 20.18 | 455998 | 5469 |
| Tiruppur | 12871153 | 15.44 | 486518 | 5835 |
| Erode | 7830709 | 9.39 | 325874 | 3909 |
| Madurai | 9964080 | 11.95 | 307313 | 3686 |
| Theni | 3196394 | 3.83 | 240406 | 2884 |
| Dindigul | 6664282 | 7.99 | 289143 | 3468 |
| Ramanathapuram | 3272699 | 3.93 | 226586 | 2718 |
| Sivagangai | 3196606 | 3.83 | 223688 | 2683 |
| Virudhunagar | 5602048 | 6.72 | 270272 | 3242 |
| Tirunelveli | 4767512 | 5.72 | 268274 | 3218 |
| Tenkasi | 4036055 | 4.84 | 268681 | 3222 |
| Thoothukudi | 5459535 | 6.55 | 292308 | 3506 |
| KanniyaKumari | 5176846 | 6.21 | 259361 | 3111 |
| Tamil Nadu | 268896332 | 322.52 | 349248 | 4189 |

== See also ==
- Andhra Pradesh district income estimates
- Bihar district income estimates
- West Bengal district income estimates
