= Nariyar railway station =

Railway station in Bihar, India

Nariyar

General information
- Location: Nariyar, Muzaffarpur district, Bihar; India
- Coordinates: 26°14′25″N 85°13′04″E
- Elevation: 59 m (194 ft)
- System: Passenger train station
- Owner: Indian Railways
- Operator: East Central Railway
- Line: Muzaffarpur–Gorakhpur main line
- Platforms: 1
- Tracks: 2

Construction
- Structure type: Standard (on ground station)

Other information
- Status: Active
- Station code: NRV
- Zone(s): East Central Railway zone
- Division(s): Samastipur

History
- Opened: 1930s

Services
| Preceding station | Indian Railways | Following station |
|---|---|---|
| Motipur towards ? | East Central Railway zone Muzaffarpur–Gorakhpur main line | Piprahan towards ? |
Location

Nariyar railway station (station code: NRV), is F category (halt) railway station on Muzaffarpur–Gorakhpur main line under the Samastipur railway division of East Central Railway zone. This is situated at Nariyar in Muzaffarpur district of the Indian state of Bihar.
