= Dekuli Dham =

Hindu religious Teerth in Mithila

- भुवनेश्वर नाथ महादेव मंदिर

Religion
- Affiliation: Hinduism
- District: Sheohar district
- Region: Mithila region
- Deity: Lord Shiva
- Festivals: Sawan Sambari, Mahashivratri

Location
- Location: Dekuli
- State: Bihar
- Country: India
- Interactive map of Dekuli Dham
- Coordinates: 26.5122570°N 85.3465947°E

Architecture
- Established: Dwapar Yuga

Dekuli Dham (Maithili: देकुली धाम) is a Hindu teerth in the Sheohar district of the Mithila region in Bihar. According to legend it is believed to be associated with the epic Mahabharata and Ramayana. There is a famous Lord Shiva temple at the campus of the Dekuli Dham known Baba Bhuvaneshwar Nath Mahadev Mandir. The chief minister Nitish Kumar of the Bihar Government has declared the campus of the Dekuli Dham as a tourist destination for Hindu pilgrimage. The government has announced plans for the renovation of the temple complex. The Dekuli Dham is a sacred place and a destination of faith for the Hindu adherents in the region.

== Description ==
Devotees from the neighbouring country Nepal, Sitamarhi district, Champaran district and Sheohar district keep coming here throughout the year. The temple is connected by the National Highway 104 with the different parts of the country. In the campus of the Dekuli Dham, there are several temples of different Hindu deities. The Baba Bhuvaneshwar Nath Mahadev Mandir located in the campus is very ancient having unique architecture. The thickness of the walls of the temple is about thirty inches. The sanctum sanctorum of the temple is about fifteen feet below where stairs have been built.

On the left and right sides of the Lord Shiva temple, there are the temples of Goddess Parvati and deity Kaal Bhairava respectively. Similarly, in the south-east corner of the complex is Mahavir Hanuman Mandir.

During the festival of Mahashivratri and Sawan Sombari, a huge numbers of adherents flock here to perform the sacred ritual Jalabhisheka on the Shivalinga of the Baba Bhuvaneshwar Nath Mahadev Mandir. The devotees take sacred water from the Bagmati river at Dubbaghat and perform Jalabhisheka at the Shivalinga of the Dekuli Dham. Every year in the Hindu month of Sawan, a famous religious fair known as Shravani Mela is held at the campus of the temple. Similarly during the festival of Kartik Purnima Snana, a large number of devotees come to the temple for worshiping the deities of the temple.

== History ==
According to the English Gazette published in 1956, Dekuli Dham is situated between the Pashupatinath of Nepal and the Harihar Kshetra of India. There is a Lord Shiva temple known as Baba Bhuvaneshwar Nath Mahadev Mandir in the campus of the tirtha. According to the villagers, temple was also mentioned on the Chowkidari receipt of the East India Company. In 1962, a Saint named Prem Bhikshu who was the resident of Chhatauni village, excavated the pond near the temple. From the excavation several rare metal statues of Dwapara Yuga period were found. These statues were established at an ancient Maul tree near the temple. The temple was constructed by carving a single stone. According to a verdict of the Calcutta High Court, the temple had been considered as an ancient temple.

== Legend ==
There is a mound at Dekuli Dham spread over about one acre of land near a big pond which according to the legend believed to be the site of the fort of the King Dhrupad in the epic Mahabharata. Similarly according to another legend, it is said that earlier there was a tunnel in the sanctum sanctorum of the temple from where the five Pandavas escaped through this tunnel and saved their lives from the Lakhsha Griha burning in Mahabharata.
