= Nandangarh stupa =

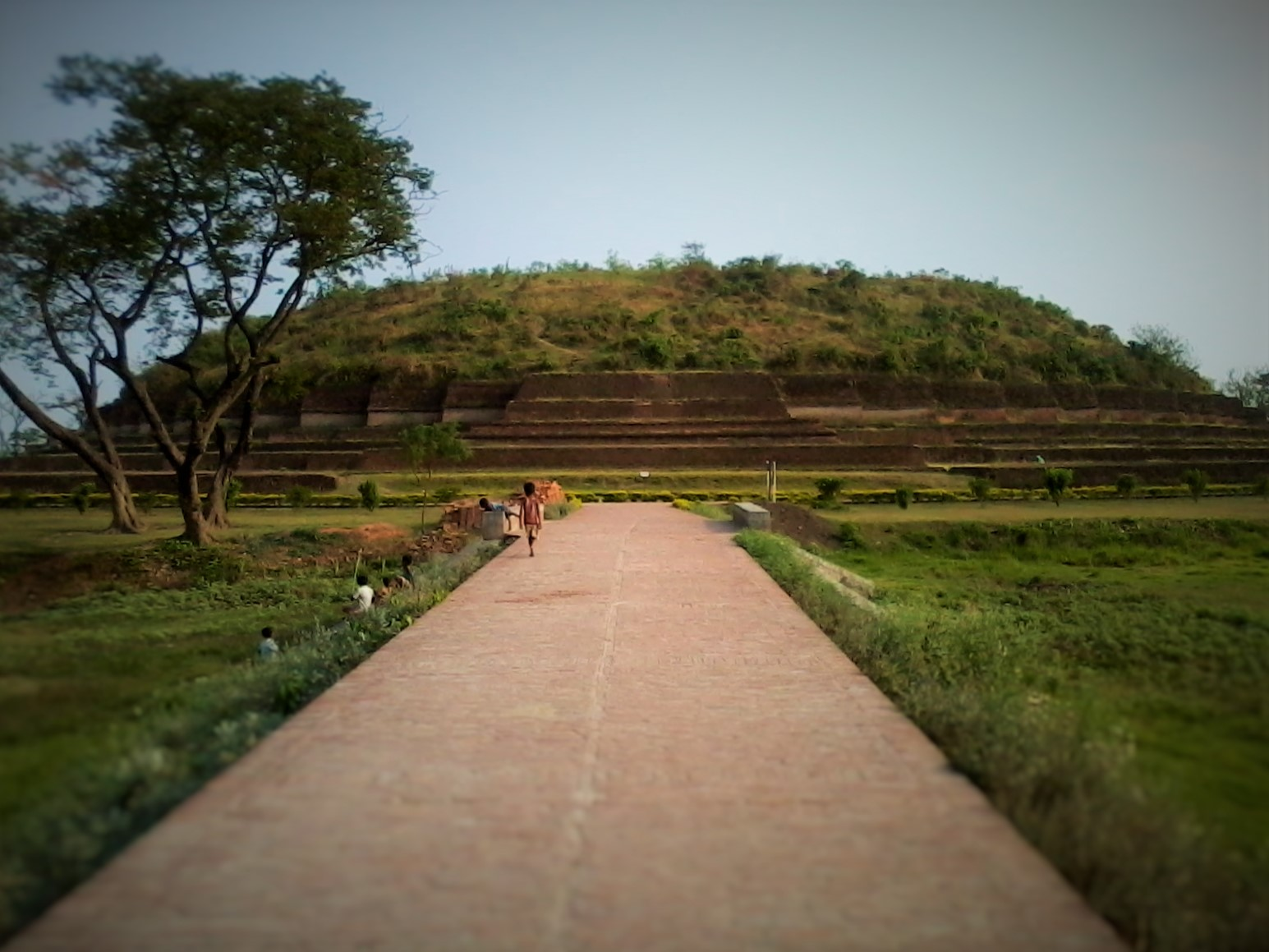
- The stupa at Nandangarh

- Location in Bihar, India

Religion
- Affiliation: Buddhism
- Status: Preserved

Location
- Location: Lauria Nandangarh, Bihar, India
- Interactive map of Nandangarh stupa
- Administration: Maurya Empire
- Coordinates: 26°59′54.52″N 84°24′30.52″E

Architecture
- Type: Stupa
- Style: Buddhist
- Completed: c. 3rd century BCE
- Materials: Brick

Nandangarh stupa is an ancient colossal stupa located near the town of Lauria Nandangarh in West Champaran district of Bihar in India. Archaeologists have identified five phases of development in the stupa with the earliest stage dating back to the Mauryan period around the third-century BCE and later alterations being made around the first century BCE.

== History ==
The stupa of Nandangarh was first excavated in 1935 and 1936 by the Archaeological Survey of India under the guidance of NG Majumdar and A Ghosh. The site itself was however noticed by Alexander Cunningham in 1861 although he initially believed the mound to have been a fort of some kind. Other archaeological finds are noted in the vicinity of the stupa including an Ashokan pillar as well as other mounds which resemble the shape of a stupa.

As was the custom of Buddhists in India at the time, the stupa itself was later enlarged upon in the following centuries with the earliest phase of the stupa being dated to the 3rd century BCE and later alterations and enlargements continuing until at least the 1st century BCE.

== Description ==
The stupa has a height of 25 metres and a width of 153 metres. It is composed of six terraces and three procession paths.
