= Kaparpura railway station =

Railway station in Muzaffarpur, Bihar, India

Kaparpura station कपरपुरा स्टेशन
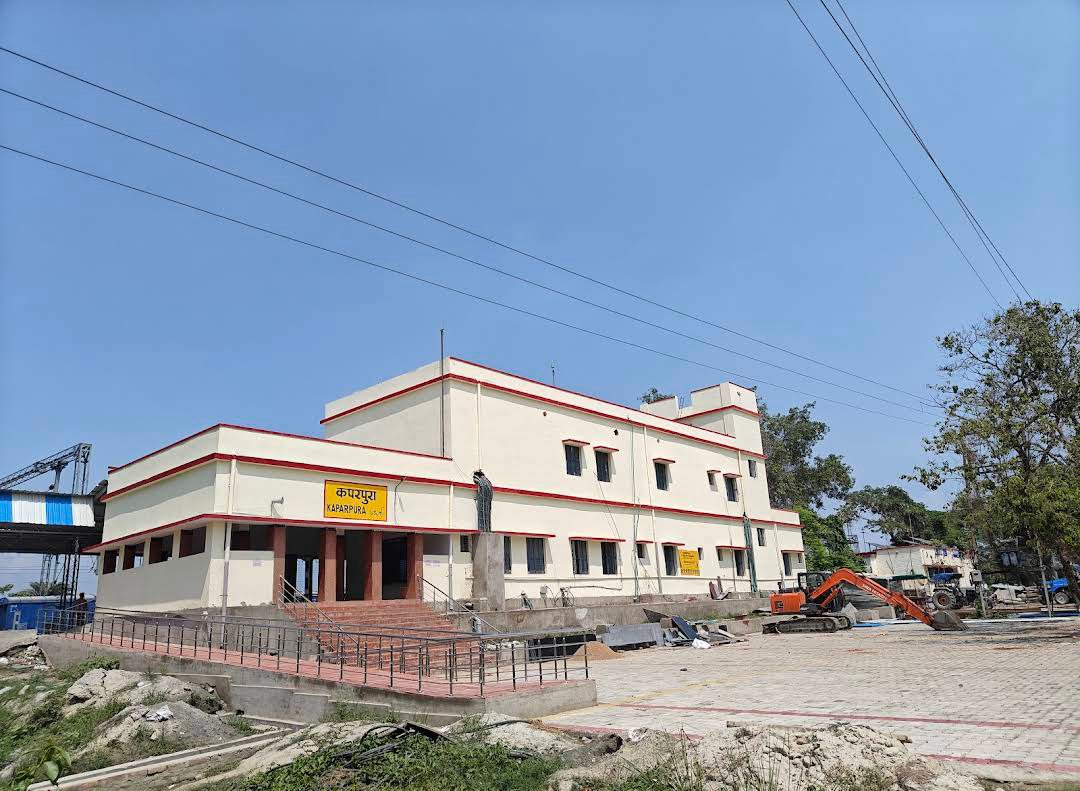

General information
- Location: Shahbazpur, Muzaffarpur, Bihar; India
- Coordinates: 26°09′50″N 85°19′34″E
- Elevation: 59 m (194 ft)
- System: Indian Railways station
- Owner: Indian Railways
- Operator: East Central Railway
- Line: Muzaffarpur–Gorakhpur main line
- Platforms: 3
- Tracks: 6

Construction
- Structure type: At-grade
- Parking: Available

Other information
- Status: Active
- Station code: KVC
- Zone(s): East Central Railway zone
- Division(s): Samastipur

History
- Opened: 1930

Services
Preceding station	Indian Railways	Following station
Kanti towards ?	East Central Railway zone Muzaffarpur–Gorakhpur main line	Muzaffarpur Junction towards ?
Location
- Location within Bihar Location within India
- Interactive map

Kaparpura railway station (station code: KVC), is a railway station on Muzaffarpur–Gorakhpur main line under the Samastipur railway division of East Central Railway zone. Kaparpura is situated beside National Highway 28 near Shahbazpur and Sadatpur in Muzaffarpur district, of the Indian state of Bihar.

== Future Plans for Kaparpura Railway Station ==
According to media reports, Kaparpura Railway Station, situated on the Gorakhpur–Muzaffarpur rail section, is proposed to be developed as the New Muzaffarpur Terminal Station. This strategic redevelopment plan is aimed at decongesting Muzaffarpur Junction, which currently experiences high passenger and train traffic.

As part of this initiative, the East Central Railway zone is planning to develop Kaparpura as a full-fledged terminal station, capable of handling originating and terminating trains. This will facilitate better train operations, reduce turnaround time, and improve service reliability in the region.

Additionally, it has been decided that a New Railway Cabin will be constructed at Sadatpur, located just before Kaparpura station. The cabin will be managed by a Station Master-level officer, and will serve as a crucial operational control point. It will manage signalling and point operations for trains moving towards both Kaparpura and the Sitamarhi rail section

The proposed cabin at Sadatpur will also function as a Junction point, enabling trains to diverge towards different directions—Kaparpura and Sitamarhi—thereby enhancing operational flexibility. Currently, trains bound for both sections operate on a shared line, but with the new junction point in place, the two routes will be operationally independent.

== Trains ==
MEMU Train Schedule: Narkatiaganj–Muzaffarpur–Raxaul Section
Train No.	Train Name	From	To	Type	Arrival	Departure	Frequency
63338	NKE–MFP MEMU	Narkatiaganj Jn (NKE)	Muzaffarpur Jn (MFP)	MEMU	06:38	06:39	Daily
63311	MFP–RXL MEMU	Muzaffarpur Jn (MFP)	Raxaul Jn (RXL)	MEMU	09:05	09:06	Daily
63314	RXL–MFP MEMU	Raxaul Jn (RXL)	Muzaffarpur Jn (MFP)	MEMU	09:19	09:20	Daily
63341	MFP–NKE MEMU	Muzaffarpur Jn (MFP)	Narkatiaganj Jn (NKE)	MEMU	12:37	12:38	Daily
63342	NKE–MFP MEMU	Narkatiaganj Jn (NKE)	Muzaffarpur Jn (MFP)	MEMU	14:30	14:31	Daily
63309	MFP–NKE MEMU	Muzaffarpur Jn (MFP)	Narkatiaganj Jn (NKE)	MEMU	15:49	15:50	Daily
63313	MFP–RXL MEMU	Muzaffarpur Jn (MFP)	Raxaul Jn (RXL)	MEMU	18:49	18:50	Daily
63312	RXL–MFP MEMU	Raxaul Jn (RXL)	Muzaffarpur Jn (MFP)	MEMU	21:17	21:18	Daily
