= Kanti railway station =

Railway station in Bihar, India

Kanti
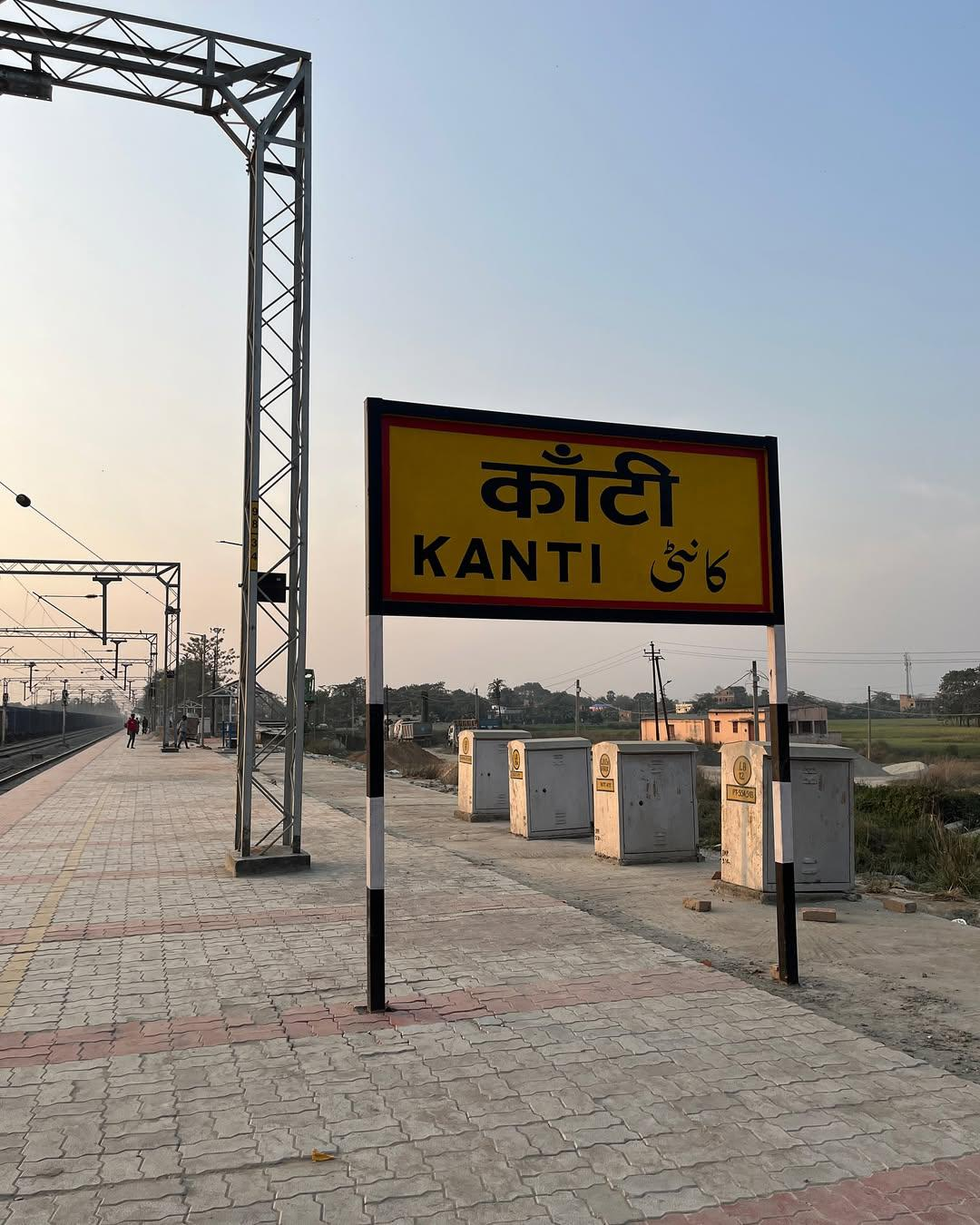

General information
- Location: Kanti, Muzaffarpur district, Bihar; India
- Coordinates: 26°11′56″N 85°17′06″E
- Elevation: 58 m (190 ft)
- System: Passenger train station
- Owner: Indian Railways
- Operator: East Central Railway
- Line: Muzaffarpur–Gorakhpur main line
- Platforms: 2
- Tracks: 2

Construction
- Structure type: Standard (on ground station)

Other information
- Status: Active
- Station code: KTI
- Zone(s): East Central Railway zone
- Division(s): Samastipur

History
- Opened: 1930s

Services
Preceding station	Indian Railways	Following station
Piprahan towards ?	East Central Railway zone Muzaffarpur–Gorakhpur main line	Kaparpura towards ?
Location

Kanti railway station (station code: KTI), is a railway station on Muzaffarpur–Gorakhpur main line under the Samastipur railway division of East Central Railway zone of India. This is situated at Kanti in Muzaffarpur district, of the Indian state of Bihar.
