= Lauria Nandangarh =

Lauria Nandangarth
- City/town
- lauriya ashok pillar
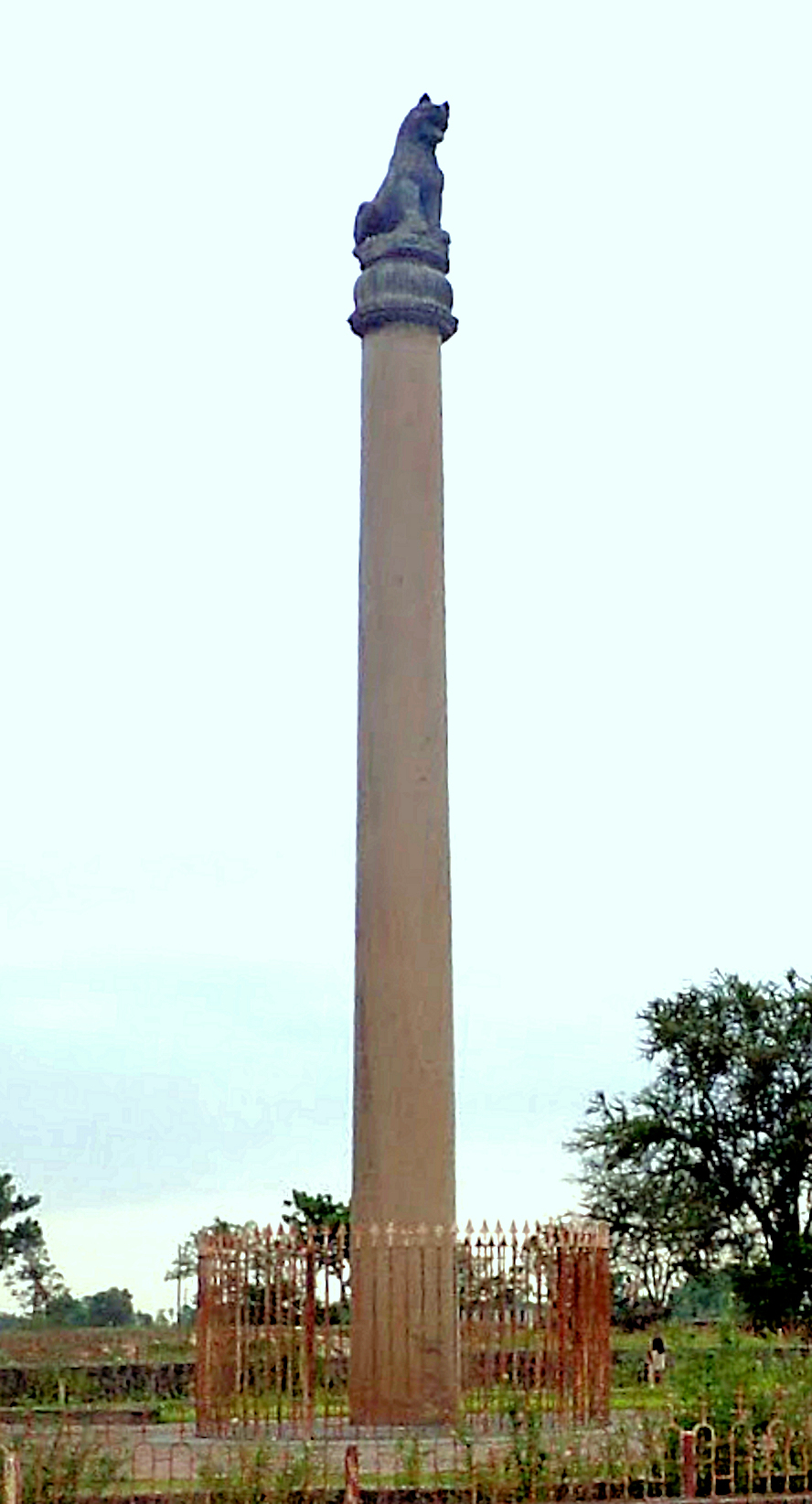
- The Pillar of Ashoka at Lauria Nandangarh. Another recent photograph here.

- Location in Bihar, India Lauria Nandangarth (Bihar)
- Coordinates: 26°59′54.52″N 84°24′30.52″E
- Country: India
- State: Bihar
- District: West Champaran

Languages
  - Official: Bhojpuri, Hindi
- Time zone: UTC+5:30 (IST)
- PIN: 845453
- Nearest city: Bettiah
- Lok Sabha constituency: Valmikinagar
- Vidhan Sabha constituency: Lauriya Yogapatti

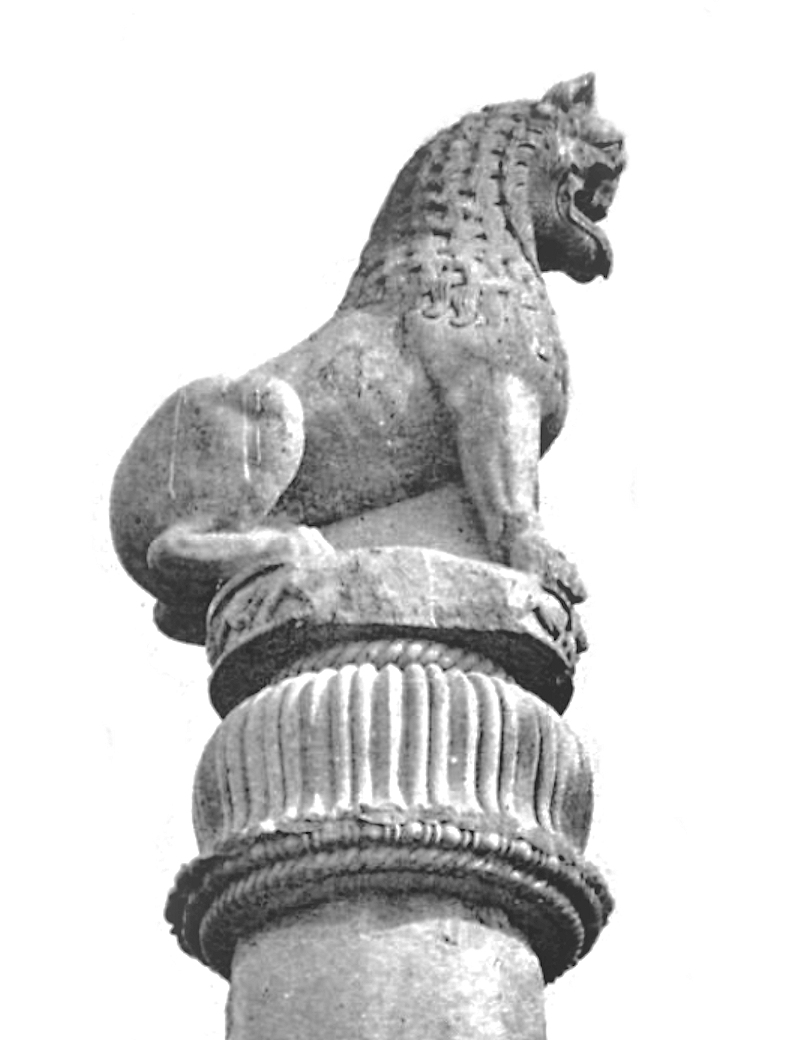
Close-up of the Capital of the Lauria Nandangarh pillar (jaws of the lion broken).

Lauria Nandangarh, also Lauriya Navandgarh, is a city or town about 14 km from Narkatiaganj (or Shikarpur) and 28 km from Bettiah in West Champaran district of Bihar state in northern India. It is situated near the banks of the Burhi Gandak River. The village draws its name from a pillar (laur) of Ashoka standing there and the stupa mound Nandangarh (variant Nanadgarh) about 2 km south-west of the pillar. Lauriya Nandangarh is a historical site located in West Champaran district of Bihar. Remains of Mauryan period have been found here.

== History & Archaeological Excavations ==
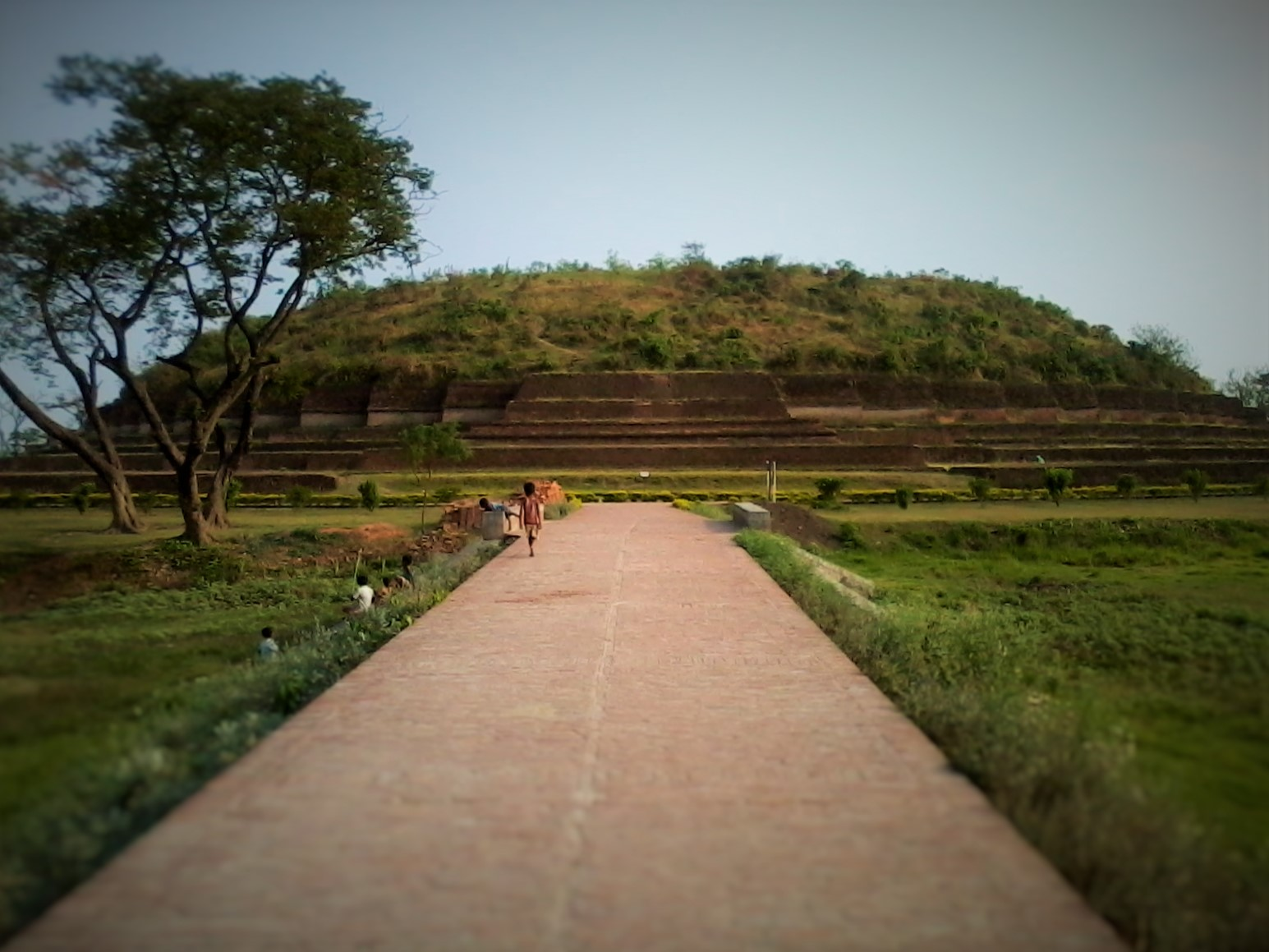
Nandangarh stupa which dates back to the 3rd century BCE

Lauriya has 15 Stupa mounds in three rows, each row upwards of 600 m; the first row begins near the pillar and goes E to W, while the other two are at right angles to it and parallel to each other.

Alexander Cunningham partially excavated one of them in 1862 and found a retaining wall of brick (size 51 X 20 cm). A few years later Henry Bailey Wade Garrick excavated several mounds with indifferent results. In 1905 T. Block excavated four mounds, two in each of the N to S rows. In two of them, he found at the center of each, at a depth of "1.8 m to 3.6 m" (probably meaning 1.8 m in one and 3.6 m in the other) a gold leaf with a female figurine standing in frontal pose and a small deposit of burnt human bones mixed with charcoal. The core of the mounds was, according to him, built of layers of yellow clay, a few centimeters in thickness, with grass leaves laid between. Further down in one of them he found the stump of a tree. His conclusions were that the earthen barrows had some connection with the funeral rites of the people who erected them, and he found an explanation of the phenomena encountered by him in the rites of cremation and post-cremation prescribed in the Vedas. On the basis of this hypothesis he identified the gold female figurine as the earth goddess Prithvi and ascribed the mounds to a pre-Mauryan age. After him the mounds came to be known loosely as "Vedic burial mounds". The locals call these mounds Bhisa, a word also recorded by Cunningham. Some believe that the 26-metre-high ancient brick sepulchral mound is the stupa where the ashes of Lord Buddha were enshrined.

In 1935–36, archaeologist Nani Gopal Majumdar re-examined the four mounds with important results. He found that all of them were earthen burial memorials with burnt brick revetments, two being faced with a brick lining in a double tier, so that there was no justification of regarding them as mere earthen barrows. He also pointed out that the golden leaves found by Block had their exact replica in the Stupa at Piprahwa which is definitely a Buddhist Stupa of 300 B.C. or earlier. The respective Lauriya Stupas might be of a comparable date and there is nothing to connect them with Vedic burial rites. The layers of yellow clay which had a share in the building up of the Vedic theory of Block, are according to observations of archaeologist Amalananda Ghosh, nothing but mud bricks, husk and straw being a common ingredient in ancient brick.

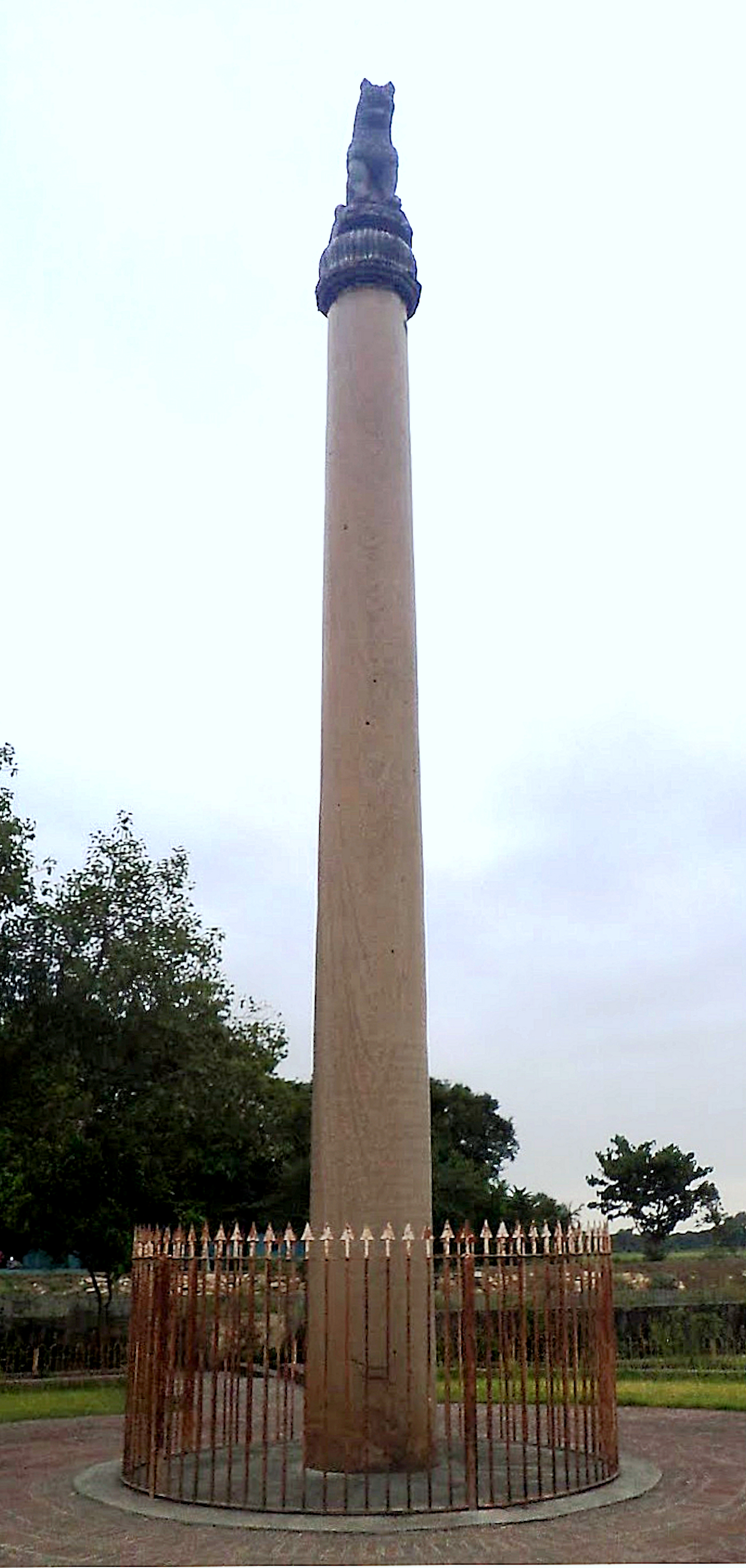
Frontal view of the pillar.

Excavation of the Nandangarh site was started by Majumdar in 1935 and continued by Ghosh until 1939. Before excavation the mound had a height of 25 m and a circumference of about 460 m, standing at the East of a brick fortification about 1.6 km in perimeter and roughly oval of plan, no doubt enclosing a habitation area, perhaps the headquarters of a clan that was responsible for the erection of the Lauriya Stupas. Surface finds indicate that it was inhabited in Shunga (if not earlier) and Kushans times.

On excavation, Nandangarh turned out to be stupendous Stupa with a polygonal or cruciform base; with its missing dome which must have been proportionately tall, the Stupa must have been one of the highest in India.

The walls of the four cardinal directions at the base (only the W ones and partly the S ones were excavated) are each 32 m long and the wall between each has a zigzag course with 14 re-entrant and 13 outer angles. The walls flanking the first and second terraces following the polygonal plan of the base; those pertaining to the upper terraces were circular. An extensive later restoration hid the four upper walls and provided new circular ones; the polygonal plan of the walls of the base and the first terrace were left unaltered. The top of each terrace served as a pradakshina-path (South facing pathway), though no staircase to reach the top was found in the excavated portion.

The core of the stupa consists of a filling of earth with a large number of animal and human figurines in the Shunga and Kushana idiom, a few punch marked coins and cast copper coins, terracotta sealing of the 2nd and 1st century B.C. and iron objects. As the earth was brought from outside, obviously from a part of the habitation area to the south of the stupa where the resultant pond is still visible, the objects are understandably not stratified.

In a shaft dug into center of the mound an undisturbed filling was found at a depth of 4.3 m the remains of a brick altar 1 m high; it has previously been truncated, perhaps by one of the explorers of the 19th and the early 20th centuries. Further down at a depth of 4.6 m from the bottom of the altar the top of an intact, miniature stupa was found, complete with a surmounting square umbrella. This stupa is 3.6 m high and polygonal on plan. An examination of its interior yielded nothing meaningful, but beside there lay a tiny copper vessel with a lid fastened to it by a wire. Inside the vessel was a long strip of the birch leaf manuscript, which having been squeezed into it was so fragile that it was impossible to spread it out and examine thoroughly without damaging it. The bits that could be extricated showed Buddhist text (probably the Pratītyasamutpāda since the word nirodha could be read a few times) written in characters of the 4th century A.D. No excavations were made at a further depth.

== Pillar of Ashoka ==
Less than half a kilometer from the village and 2 km from the mound, stands the famous pillar of Ashoka. It is a single block of polished sandstone over 32 feet (10 m) high. The top is bell shaped with a circular abacus ornamented with Brahmi geese supporting the statue of a lion.

The pillar is inscribed with the edicts of Ashoka in clear and beautifully cut characters. The lion has been chipped in the mouth and the column bears the mark of time just below the top which has itself been slightly dislodged. Signs of vandalism over the years are clearly visible.

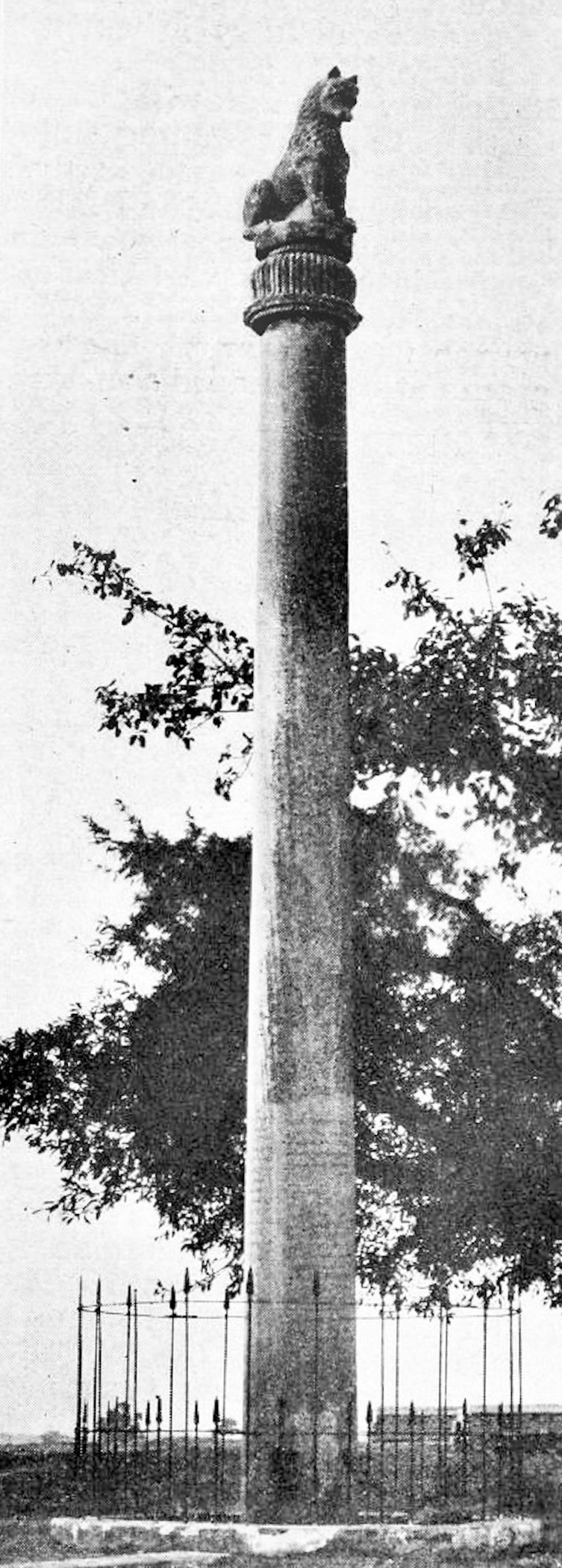
Photographed in 1911.

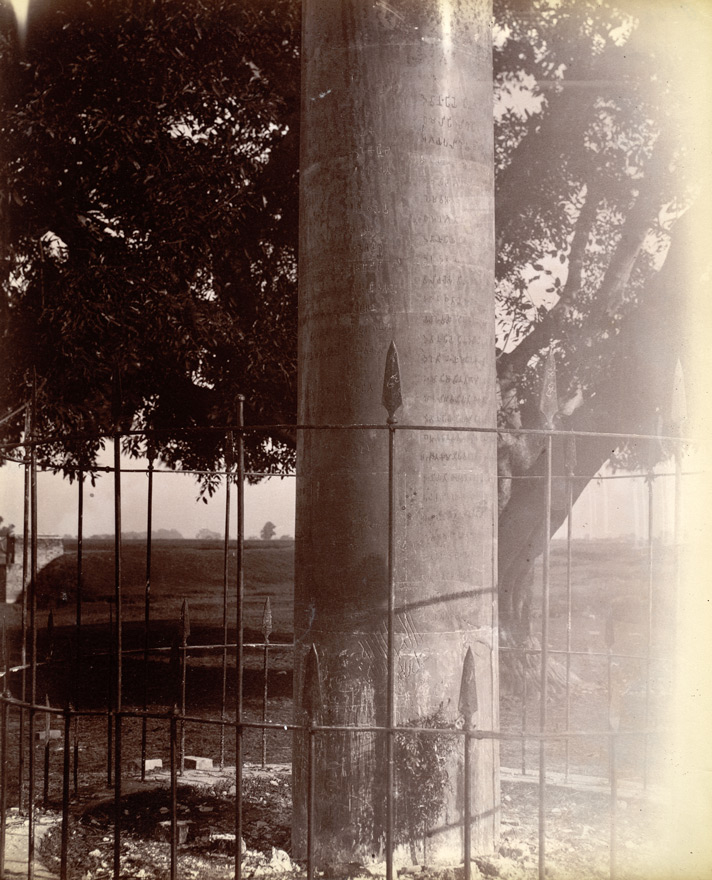
Close view of the inscriptions.

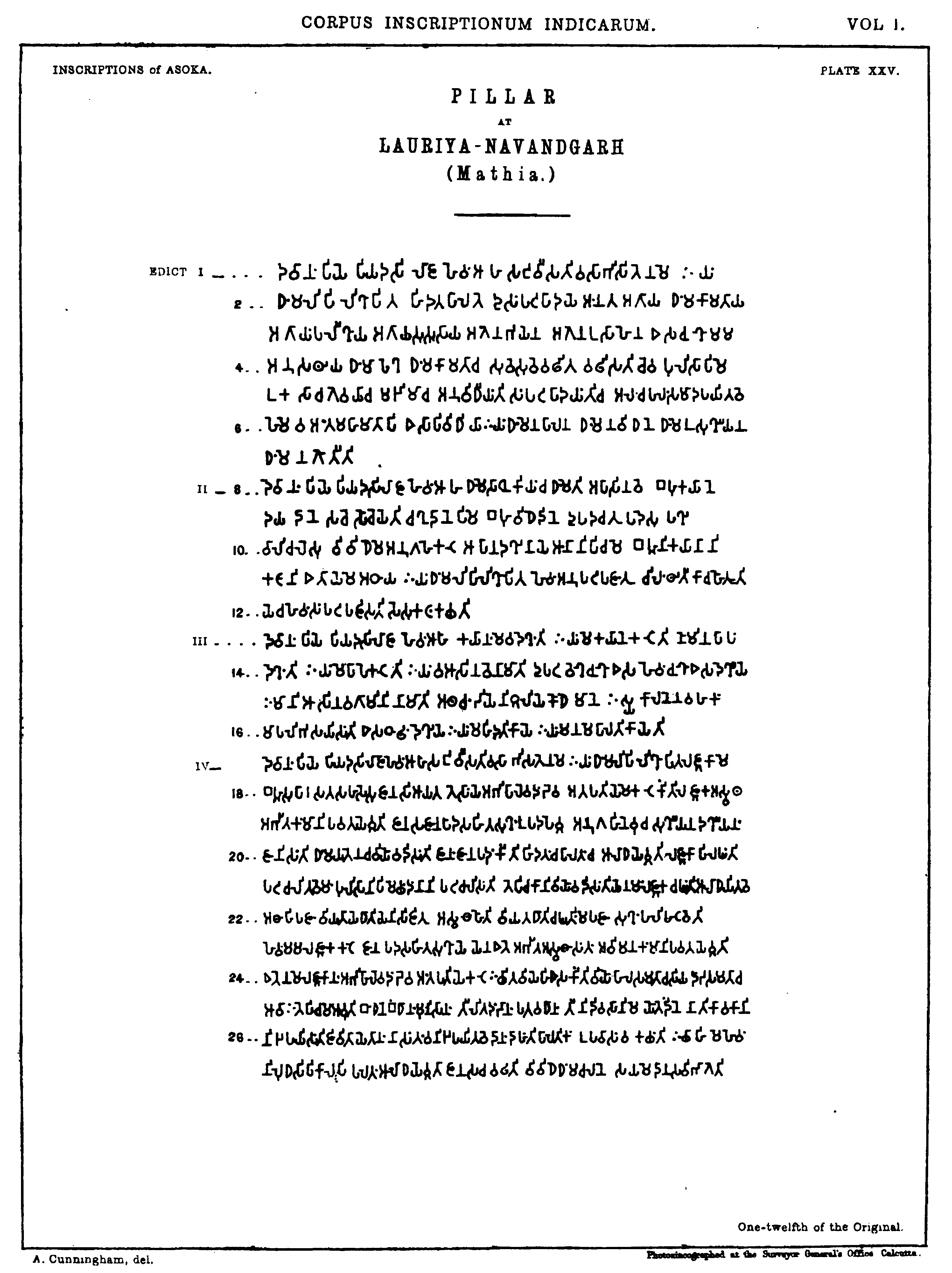
Edicts.

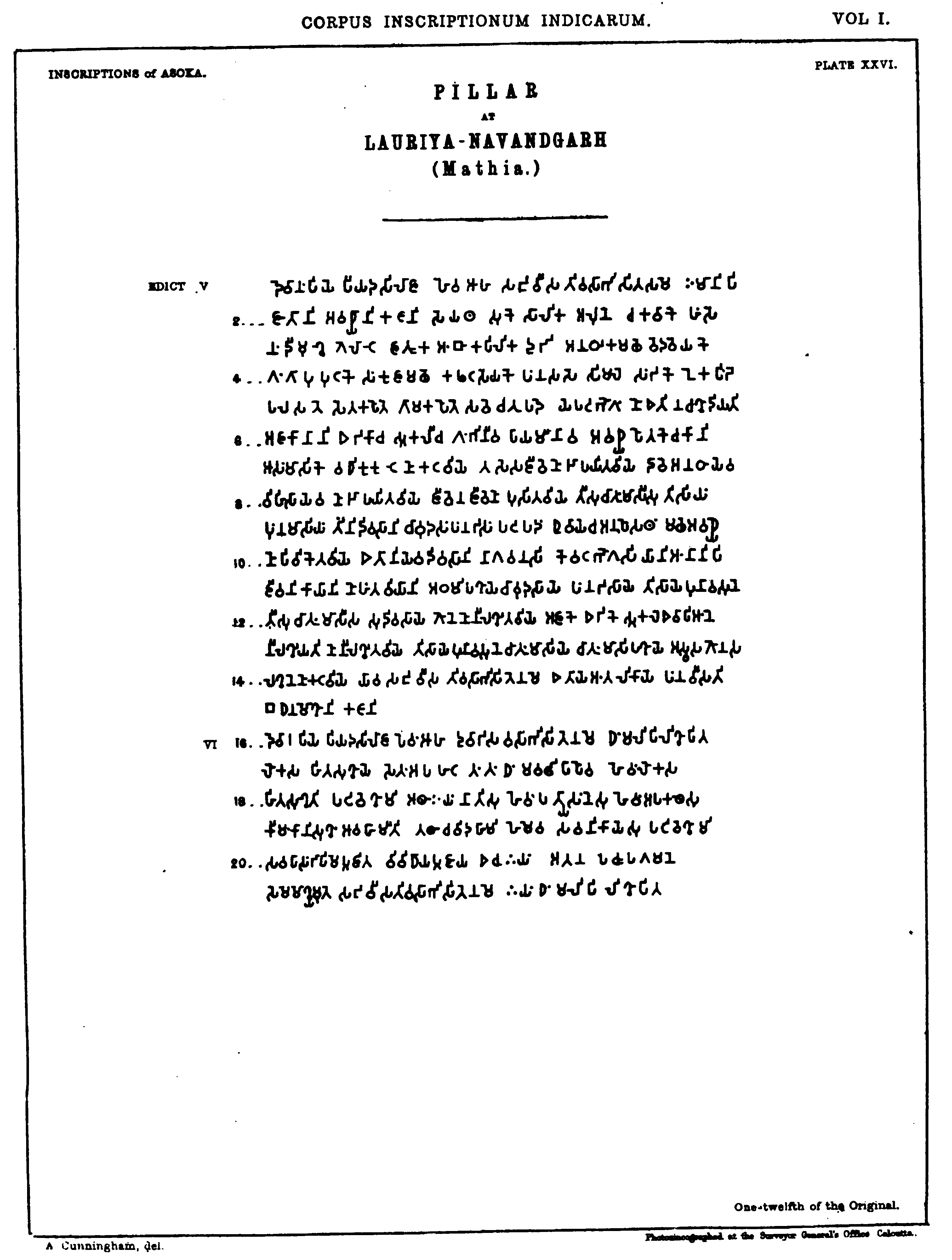
Edicts.

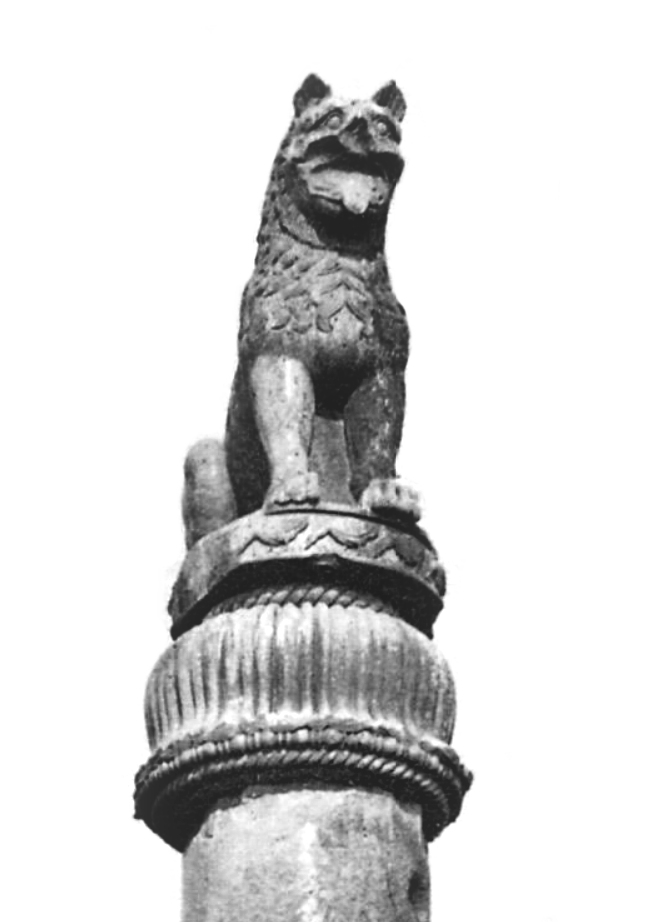
Frontal close-up of the lion (jaws broken). The geese of the abacus are clearly visible.

== See also ==
- Mauryan art
- Pillars of Ashoka
