= Piprahan railway station =

Railway station in Bihar, India

Piprahan

General information
- Location: Piprahan Asli, Muzaffarpur district, Bihar; India
- Coordinates: 26°13′28″N 85°14′49″E
- Elevation: 59 m (194 ft)
- System: Passenger train station
- Owner: Indian Railways
- Operator: East Central Railway
- Line: Muzaffarpur–Gorakhpur main line
- Platforms: 1
- Tracks: 1

Construction
- Structure type: Standard (on ground station)
- Parking: Yes (Note: Located at National Highway)

Other information
- Status: Active
- Station code: PPRH
- Zone(s): East Central Railway zone
- Division(s): Samastipur

History
- Opened: 1990s

Services
Preceding station	Indian Railways	Following station
Nariyar towards ?	East Central Railway zone Muzaffarpur–Gorakhpur main line	Kanti towards ?
Location

Piprahan railway station (station code: PPRH), is a halt railway station (Note: Halt railway station are those stations with less significance.)on Muzaffarpur–Gorakhpur main line under the Samastipur railway division of East Central Railway zone. It is established at Piprahan Asli in Muzaffarpur district of the Indian state of Bihar. It is mostly stoppage of MEMU and DMU trains crossing by.
