= Motipur, Muzaffarpur =

Motipur
- Town
- Location in Bihar, India
- Coordinates: 26.3°N 85.13°E Map
- Country: India
- State: Bihar
- District: Muzaffarpur

Government
  - MLA: Arun Kumar Singh (BJP)
  - Member of Parliament: Veena Devi
- Elevation: 60 m (200 ft)

Population (2011)
  - Total: 28,572

Languages
  - Official: Bhojpuri, Hindi
- Time zone: UTC+5:30 (IST)
- PIN: 843111
- Telephone code: 91-6223
- ISO 3166 code: IN-BR
- Vidhan Sabha constituency: Baruraj
- Lok Sabha constituency: Vaishali
- Civic agency: Motipur Nagar Parishad
- Website: www.nagarparishadmotipur.com

Motipur is a town and a notified area in Muzaffarpur district. It is located 14 kilometres south of Mehsi in the Indian state of Bihar. In 2021, Motipur Nagar Panchayat was upgraded to Nagar Parishad (Municipal Council).

== Location ==
Motipur is located 102 kilometres (63 mi) north of Patna, 30 kilometres (19 mi) north of Muzaffarpur and 14 kilometres (9 mi) south of Mehsi East Champaran District of 15 kilometres. National Highway 28 passes through Motipur. The nearest airport is Patna Airport.

Motipur is connected with the road and railways networks (Northern Eastern Railway). Railway services provide direct connections with all of the metropolitan cities of India. The railway has direct service from Motipur railway station.

== River ==
The river Budhi Gandak flows beside the town of Mehsi. Budhi Gandak is one of the branches of Gandak river.

== Demographics ==
As of 2001 India census, Motipur had a population of 21,933. Males constitute 53% of the population and females 47%. Motipur has an average literacy rate of 43%, lower than the national average of 59.5%: male literacy is 52%, and female literacy is 33%. In Motipur, 19% of the population is under 6 years of age.
