= Motipur railway station =

Railway station in Bihar, India

Motipur मोतीपुर
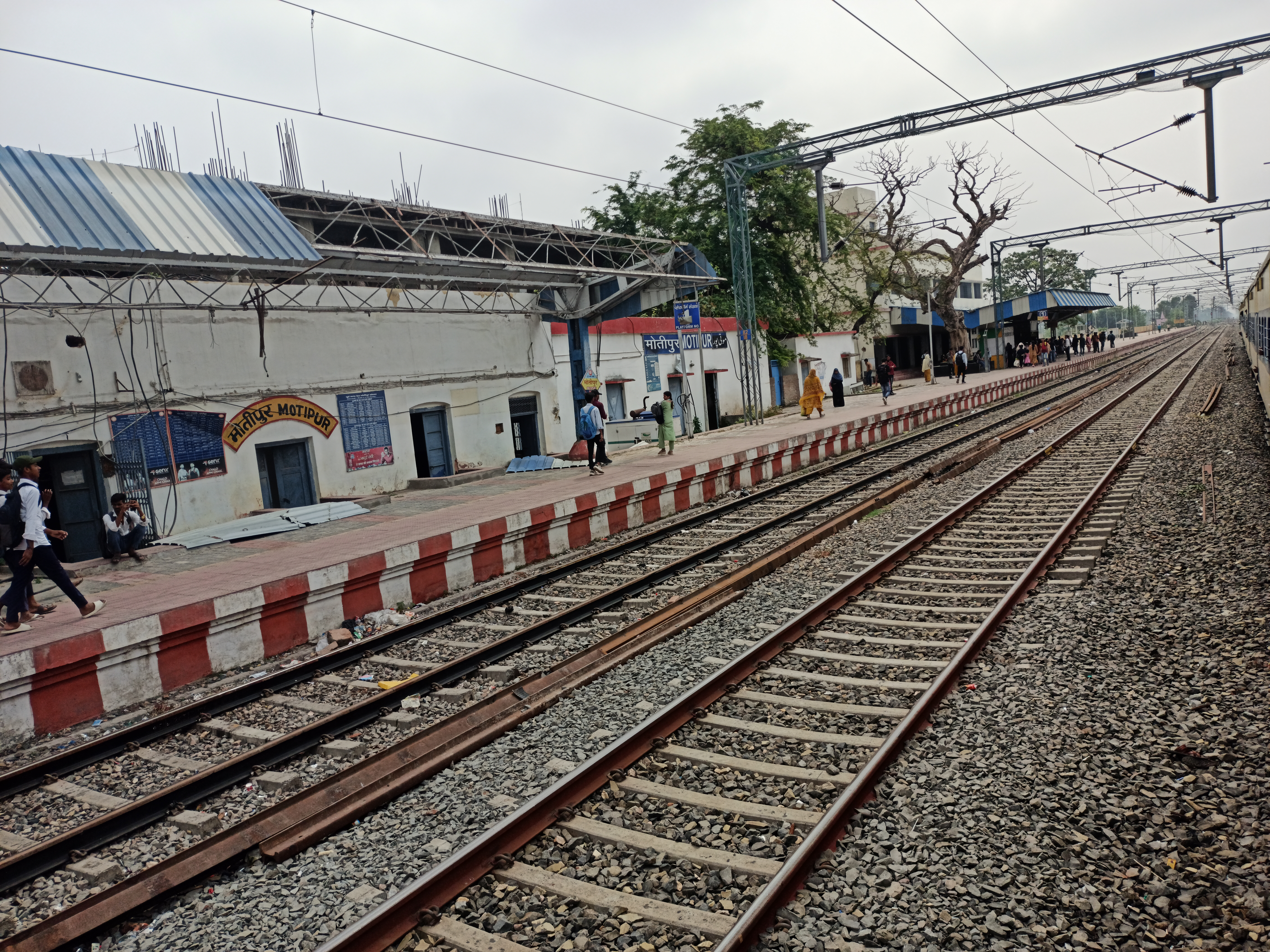
- Motipur Railway Station

General information
- Location: National Highway 28, Ratanpura, Motipur, Muzaffarpur district, Bihar; India
- Coordinates: 26°15′25″N 85°10′06″E
- Elevation: 61 m (200 ft)
- System: Passenger train station
- Owner: Indian Railways
- Operator: East Central Railway
- Line: Muzaffarpur–Gorakhpur main line
- Platforms: 2
- Tracks: 2

Construction
- Structure type: Standard (on ground station)

Other information
- Status: Active
- Station code: MTR
- Zone(s): East Central Railway zone
- Division(s): Samastipur

History
- Opened: 1930s

Services
Preceding station	Indian Railways	Following station
Mahwal towards ?	East Central Railway zone Muzaffarpur–Gorakhpur main line	Nariyar towards ?
Location

Motipur railway station (station code: MTR) is a F category (halt) railway station on Muzaffarpur–Gorakhpur main line under the Samastipur railway division of East Central Railway zone. This is situated beside National Highway 28 at Ratanpura, Motipur in Muzaffarpur district of the Indian state of Bihar.

== Trains schedule ==
Train No.	Train Name	Route	Type	Classes	Frequency	Arrival	Departure
14015	SADBHAVANA EXP	Raxaul Jn (RXL) – Anand Vihar Terminal (ANVT)	Mail Express	–	🟨 Mon, Wed	01:18	01:20
15654	AMARNATH EXP	Jammu Tawi (JAT) – Guwahati (GHY)	Mail Express	–	🟨 Sun	02:04	02:06
15556	BMKI–PPTA INTERCITY EXP	Bapudm Motihari (BMKI) – Patliputra (PPTA)	Mail Express	GEN	🟩 Daily	06:54	06:56
15653	AMARNATH EXP	Guwahati (GHY) – Jammu Tawi (JAT)	Mail Express	–	🟨 Thu	07:37	07:39
15202	BUG–PPTA INTERCITY EXP	Bagaha (BUG) – Patliputra (PPTA)	Mail Express	–	🟩 Daily	07:51	07:53
15215	MFP–NKE EXPRESS	Muzaffarpur Jn (MFP) – Narkatiaganj Jn (NKE)	Mail Express	–	🟩 Daily	08:04	08:06
12558	SAPT KRANTI EXP	Anand Vihar Terminal (ANVT) – Muzaffarpur Jn (MFP)	Superfast	–	🟩 Daily	09:28	09:30
19038	AVADH EXPRESS	Barauni Jn (BJU) – Bandra Terminus (BDTS)	Mail Express	–	🟩 Daily	10:12	10:14
12557	SAPT KRANTI EXP	Muzaffarpur Jn (MFP) – Anand Vihar Terminal (ANVT)	Superfast	–	🟩 Daily	12:07	12:09
15216	NKE–MFP EXPRESS	Narkatiaganj Jn (NKE) – Muzaffarpur Jn (MFP)	Mail Express	–	🟩 Daily	16:19	16:21
14016	SADHBHAWNA EXP	Anand Vihar Terminal (ANVT) – Raxaul Jn (RXL)	Mail Express	–	🟨 Mon, Sat	18:43	18:45
19037	AVADH EXP	Bandra Terminus (BDTS) – Barauni Jn (BJU)	Mail Express	–	🟩 Daily	18:58	19:00
15201	PPTA–BUG INTERCITY EXP	Patliputra (PPTA) – Bagaha (BUG)	Mail Express	–	🟩 Daily	20:18	20:20
15211	DBG–ASR JAN NAYAK EXP	Darbhanga Jn (DBG) – Amritsar (ASR)	Mail Express	–	🟩 Daily	20:54	20:56
15555	PPTA–BMKI INTERCITY EXP	Patliputra (PPTA) – Bapudm Motihari (BMKI)	Mail Express	–	🟩 Daily	21:31	21:33
15212	ASR–DBG JAN NAYAK EXP	Amritsar (ASR) – Darbhanga Jn (DBG)	Mail Express	–	🟩 Daily	22:58	23:00

== See also ==
- Muzaffarpur Junction
