= Mehsi railway station =

Railway station in Bihar, India

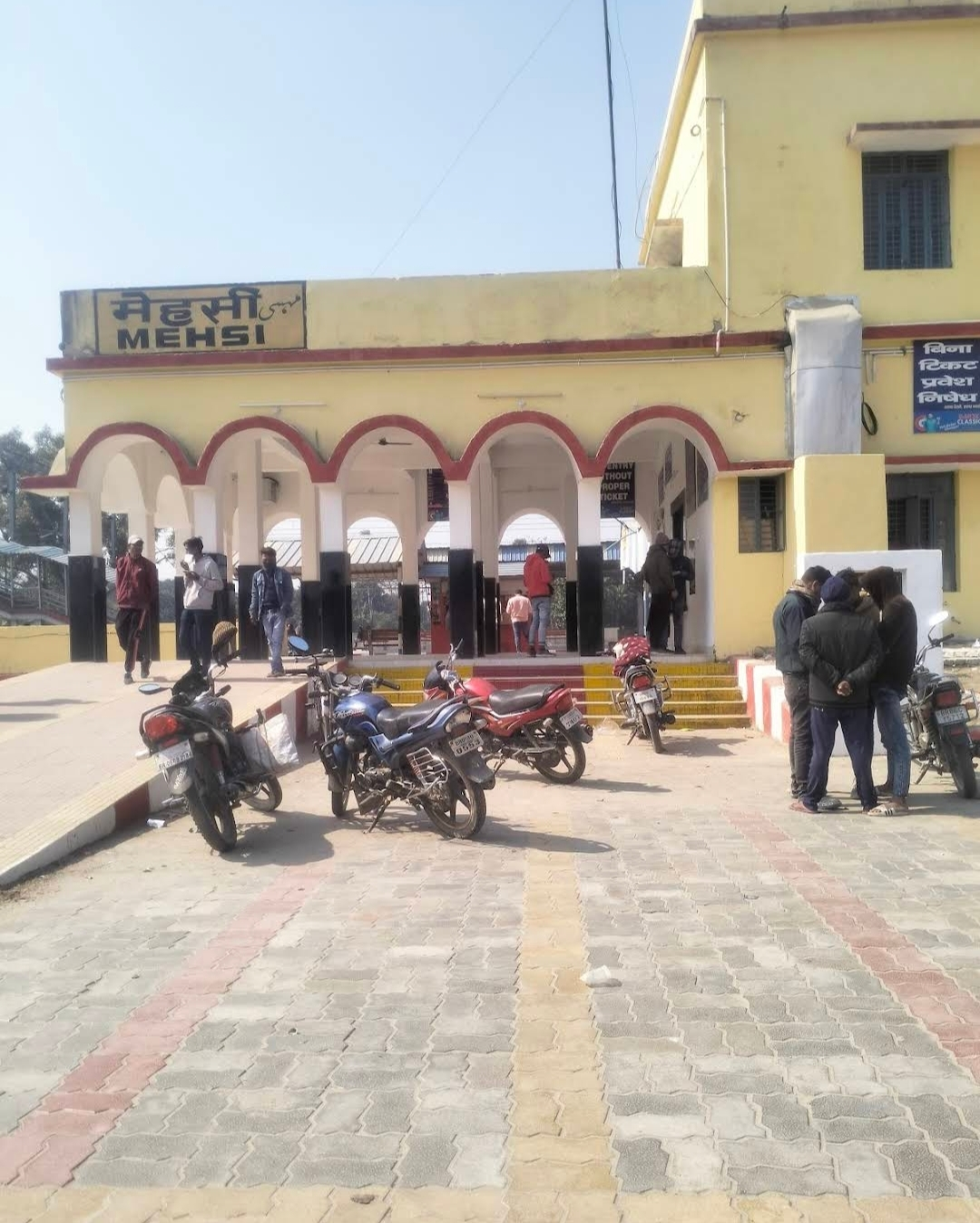
- Main view of Mehsi Railway Station

General information
- Coordinates: 26°21′18″N 85°05′47″E
- Elevation: 65 m (213 ft)
- System: Express train and Passenger train station
- Owner: Indian Railways
- Operator: East Central Railway
- Line: Muzaffarpur–Gorakhpur main line
- Platforms: PF-1, PF-2, (PF-3, PF-4, PF-5 Not Complete)
- Tracks: 3
- Connections: auto rickshaw, taxi services

Construction
- Structure type: Standard (on ground station)
- Parking: available

Other information
- Status: Functioning
- Station code: MAI
- Zone(s): East Central Railway zone
- Division(s): Samastipur

History
- Opened: 1930s
- Former names: East Indian Railway

Passengers
- 86,025 per day

Services
Preceding station	Indian Railways	Following station
Harpur Nag Halt towards ?	East Central Railway zone Muzaffarpur–Gorakhpur main line	Mahwal towards ?
Location
- Interactive map

Mehsi railway station (station code: MAI), is a railway station serving the city of Mehsi in the Indian state of Bihar. Mehsi is in the Samastipur railway division of the East Central Railway zone. Mehsi is well connected with Muzaffarpur Junction, Motihari, Hajipur Junction, Patna Junction, Barauni Junction, Gorakhpur Junction and other major stations through daily passenger and express train services. It is situated on the Muzaffarpur–Gorakhpur main line in East Champaran district and serves as an important railhead for Mehsi town and the surrounding region.

== History and significance ==
Mehsi railway station is an important railway station located in the East Champaran district of Bihar, India. It lies on the Muzaffarpur–Motihari railway section under the Samastipur railway division of the East Central Railway zone. The station serves Mehsi town and nearby rural regions, connecting the area with major cities of Bihar and northern India.

The railway station has historical importance due to its association with the Champaran Satyagraha, one of the earliest movements of the Indian independence struggle led by Mahatma Gandhi in 1917. During his journey toward Champaran to investigate the condition of indigo farmers under British rule, Gandhi passed through the Mehsi region and received public support from local residents. The railway route connecting Muzaffarpur and Motihari played a significant role in facilitating communication and movement during the freedom movement in Champaran.

Mehsi and its surrounding areas were actively involved in political and social activities during the Indian independence movement. Several local leaders and freedom fighters from the region participated in nationalist campaigns and public mobilization. Among the prominent personalities associated with the area was Siyaram Thakur, who later became a Member of the Legislative Assembly (MLA) from the Janata Party government during 1977–1979.

Over the decades, Mehsi railway station has developed as an important transportation hub for passengers, traders, students, and daily commuters. The station supports regional agricultural trade and local business activities, especially for nearby villages dependent on railway connectivity. It also serves pilgrims and visitors travelling toward historical locations in the Champaran region.

The station is equipped with basic passenger facilities including platforms, waiting areas, ticket booking services, and railway connectivity to major towns such as Muzaffarpur, Motihari, Patna, and Delhi. Electrification and modernization projects on the railway section have improved train operations and passenger convenience in recent years.

Today, Mehsi railway station continues to play a vital role in the socio-economic development of the region while also preserving its historical association with the Champaran movement and India's freedom struggle.
