= Sheohar district =

District in Bihar, India

Sheohar district Shivahar
- District of Bihar
- Location of Sheohar district in Bihar
- Country: India
- State: Bihar
- Division: Tirhut
- Established: 1994
- Headquarters: Sheohar

Government
  - Lok Sabha constituencies: Sheohar
  - Vidhan Sabha constituencies: Sheohar

Area
  - Total: 349 km^{2} (135 sq mi)

Population (2011)
  - Total: 656,246
  - Density: 1,880/km^{2} (4,870/sq mi)

Demographics
  - Sex ratio: 893
- Time zone: UTC+05:30 (IST)
- PIN: 843329
- Major highways: Gorakhpur–Siliguri Expressway, SH-54, NH-227, Mehsi–Sheohar Road, Sheohar–Muzaffarpur Expressway
- Average annual precipitation: 720.4 mm
- Website: https://sheohar.nic.in/

Map

The area of present-day Sheohar has historical connections with the wider Mehsi Pargana region. Historical records of Champaran describe Mehsi and Babra as parganas associated with the Sheohar Raj during the late 18th century. The two parganas were included in the 1791 Decennial Settlement and the arrangement was subsequently confirmed under the Permanent Settlement in 1793. These historical administrative and zamindari relationships predate the creation of the present-day Sheohar district in 1994 and illustrate the historical links between Mehsi and the surrounding territory of northern Bihar.

The district occupies an area of 349 km^{2} and had a population of 656,246 in the 2011 Census. Agriculture is an important part of the district economy. The district has a predominantly rural population and is affected by seasonal flooding.

The district headquarters, Sheohar, is located about 27 km south of Sitamarhi. It is connected by road with Sitamarhi, Bairgania, Mehsi and Muzaffarpur. Mehsi is located approximately 31 km north-east of Sheohar and forms an important road connection between Sheohar and the Muzaffarpur region. The road network connects Sheohar with neighbouring towns and districts in northern Bihar.

The name Sheohar is traditionally associated with the words Shiva (शिव) and Har (हर), names associated with Shiva. Agriculture is the mainstay of the district. Sheohar is among the flood-affected districts of Bihar, particularly because of flooding associated with the Bagmati and Budhi Gandak river systems. Devkuli is a religious site known for its ancient temple dedicated to Shiva.

As of the 2011 Census, Sheohar was the second least populous district in Bihar, after Sheikhpura.

== Geography ==
Sheohar district occupies an area of 349 square kilometres (135 sq mi). It is bordered by three districts from north and east Sitamarhi, from west East Champaran and from south Muzaffarpur. Belwa Ghat (a panchayat) is sharing bordered by west East Champaran, from where devotees take jal for offer jal at Areraj temple from Bagmati river. Belwa Ghat and Indarwa Khurd is most flooded area of Sheohar District.

== Politics ==
District	No.	Constituency	Name	Party	Alliance	Remarks
Sheohar	22	Sheohar	Shweta Gupta	JD(U)	NDA	

== Economy ==
In 2006 the Ministry of Panchayati Raj named Sheohar one of the country's 250 most backward districts (out of a total of 640). It is one of the 36 districts in Bihar currently receiving funds from the Backward Regions Grant Fund Programme (BRGF).

== Sub-divisions ==
The district comprises only one sub-division, namely, Sheohar, which is further divided into five blocks: Sheohar, Tariyani, Piprahi, Dumri-katsari, Purnahiya.

== Demographics ==
Historical population
Year	Pop.	±% p.a.
1901	157,686	—
1911	162,800	+0.32%
1921	157,618	−0.32%
1931	168,264	+0.66%
1941	185,635	+0.99%
1951	201,431	+0.82%
1961	228,420	+1.27%
1971	258,839	+1.26%
1981	304,431	+1.64%
1991	377,699	+2.18%
2001	515,961	+3.17%
2011	656,246	+2.43%

Religions in Sheohar District (2011)
Religion	Percent
Hinduism	84.19%
Islam	15.14%
Other or not stated	0.67%

According to the 2011 census Sheohar district has a population of 656,246, roughly equal to the nation of Montenegro or the US state of Vermont. This gives it a ranking of 511th in India (out of a total of 640). The district has a population density of 1,880 inhabitants per square kilometre (4,900/sq mi). Hiramma is a village known for its highest illiteracy rate. Its population growth rate over the decade 2001-2011 was 27.32%. Sheohar has a sex ratio of 893 females for every 1000 males, and a literacy rate of 72%. 4.29% of the population lives in urban areas. Scheduled Castes and Scheduled Tribes made up 14.73% and 0.05% of the population respectively.

Languages of Sheohar district (2011)
1. Other 'Hindi' (68.7%)
2. Hindi (23.0%)
3. Urdu (7.78%)
4. Others (0.55%)

At the time of the 2011 Census of India, 22.97% of the population in the district spoke Hindi and 7.78% Urdu as their first language. 68.70% of the population recorded their first language as a dialect classified as Other Hindi on the census. The main language of the region is Bajjika, variously regarded as dialect of Maithili.

== Politicians ==
- Thakur Jugal Kishore Sinha, Freedom Fighter, Member 1st Lok Sabha, popularly known as the father of Cooperative Movement
- Ram Dulari Sinha, Freedom Fighter, Former Union Minister & Governor
- Raghunath Jha, Former Union Minister, maker of Sheohar District
- Hari Kishore Singh, Former Ambassador of Syria
- Anwarul Haque, Former MP of Sheohar
- Sitaram Singh, Former MP of Sheohar
- Rama Devi, former MP of Sheohar
- Lovely Anand Current MP of Sheohar JDU, alliance of NDA.
- SWETTA GUPTA Current MlA of Sheohar

BJP, alliance of Bjp
