= Mehsi, Bihar =

Town in Bihar, India

Mehsi Kasba Mehsi
- Town
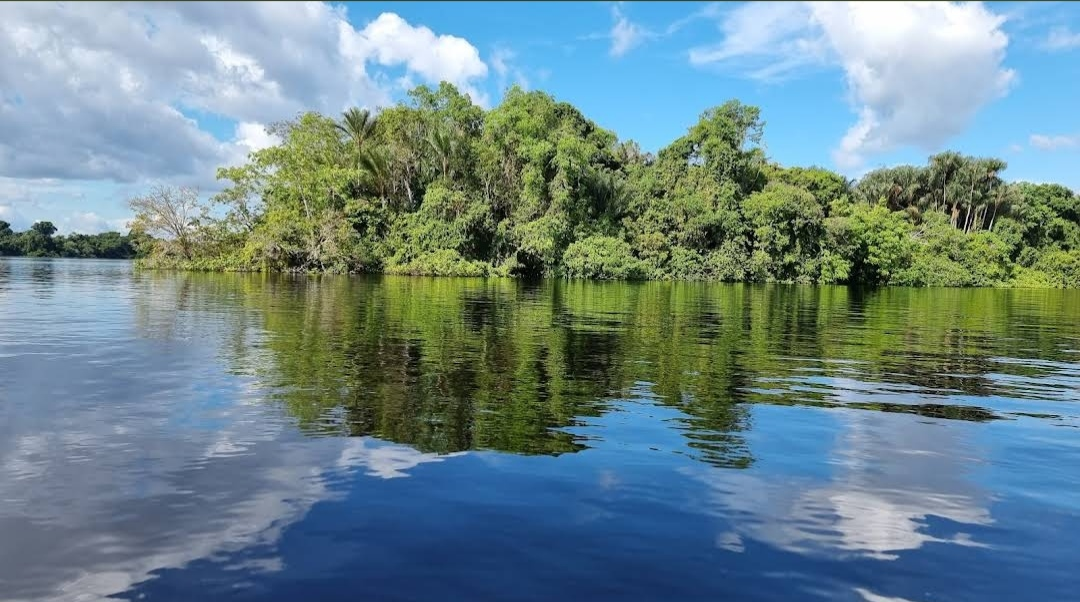
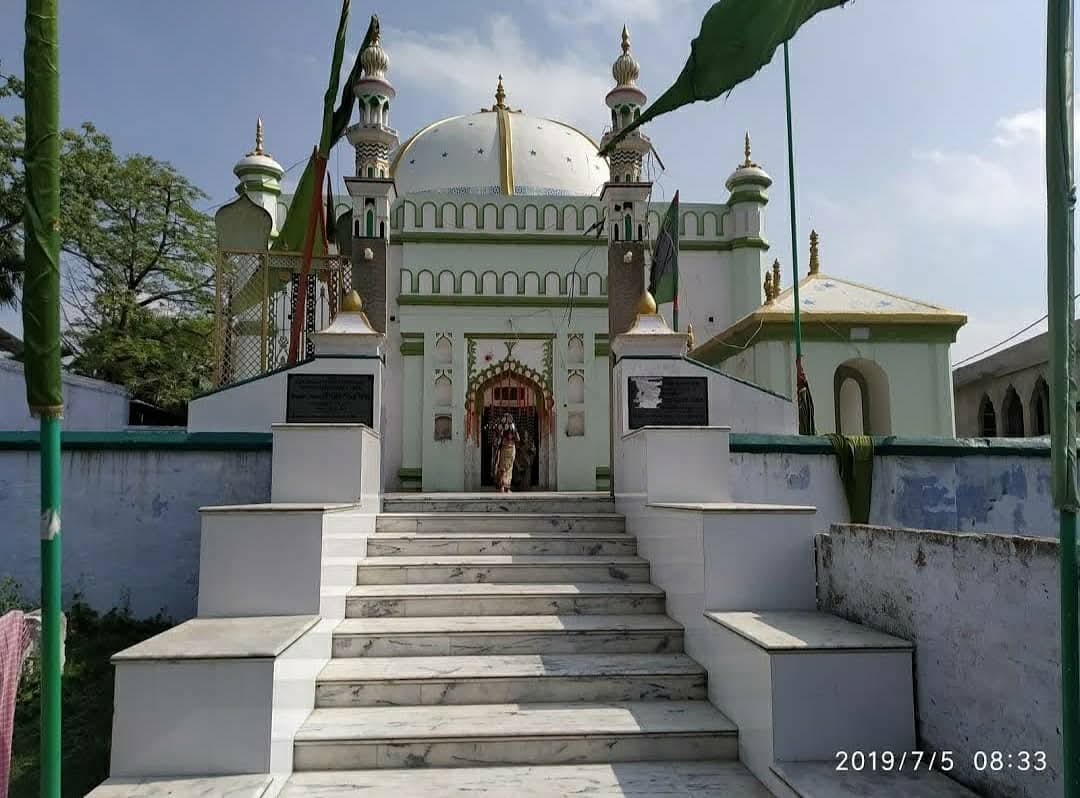
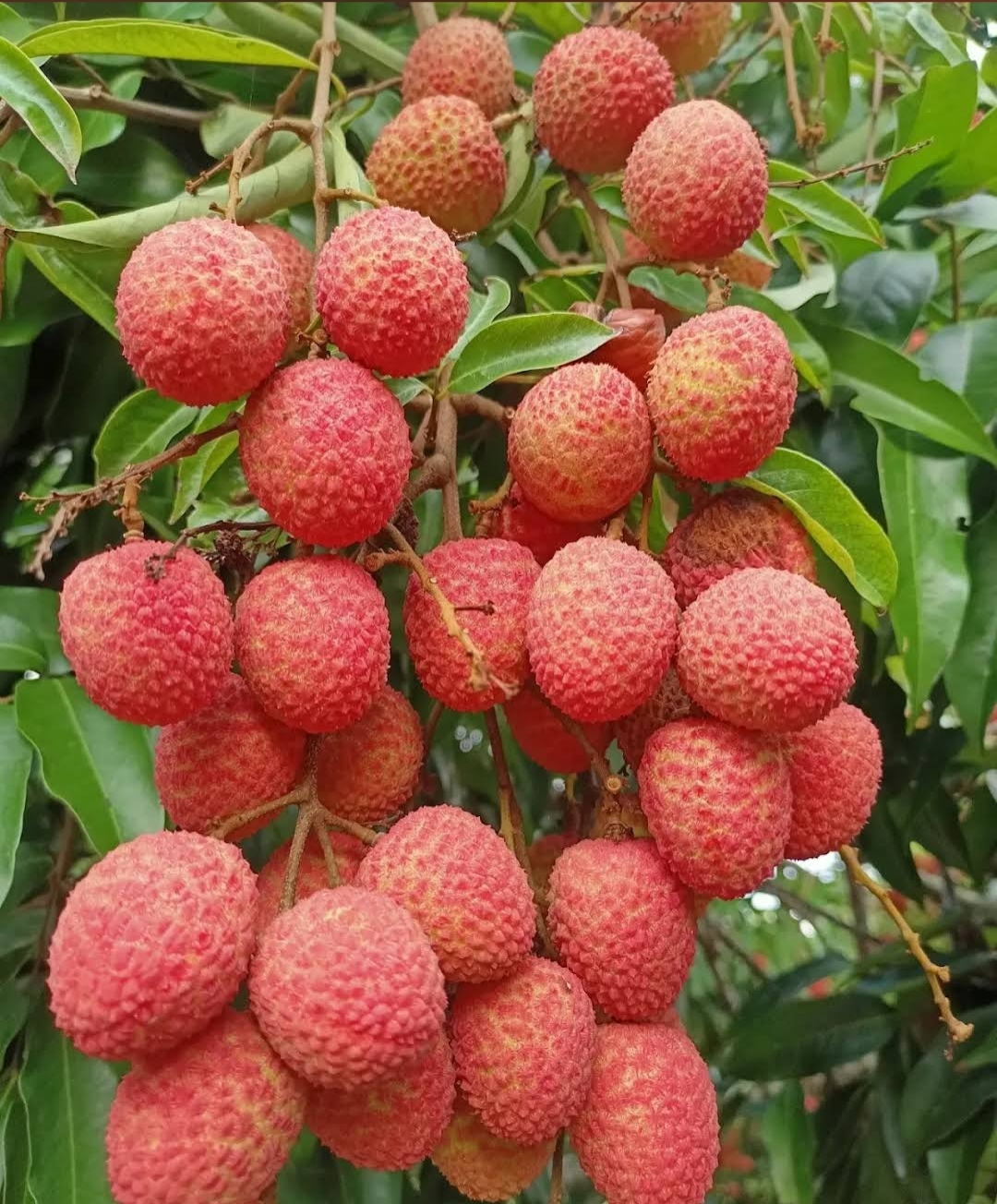
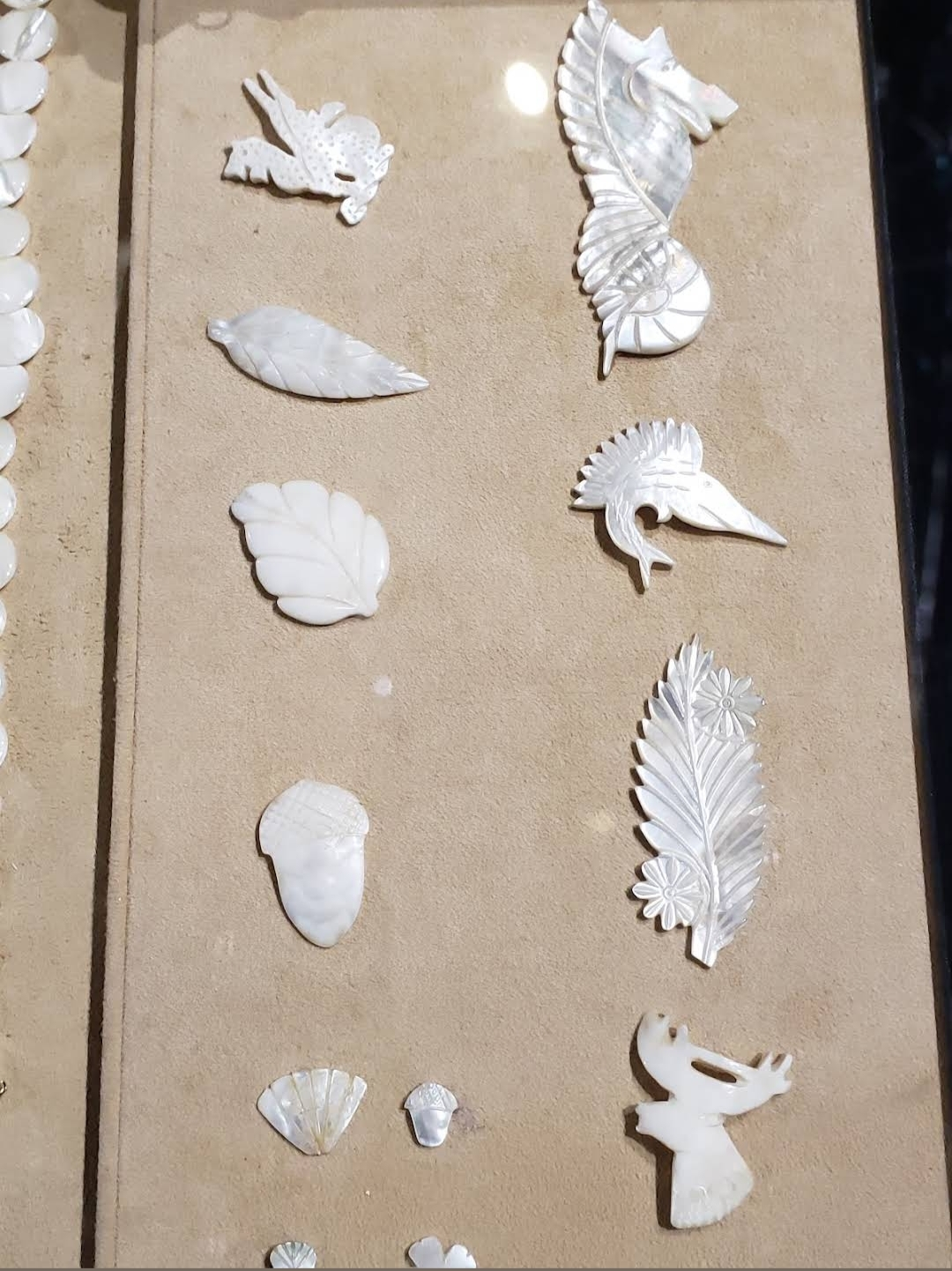
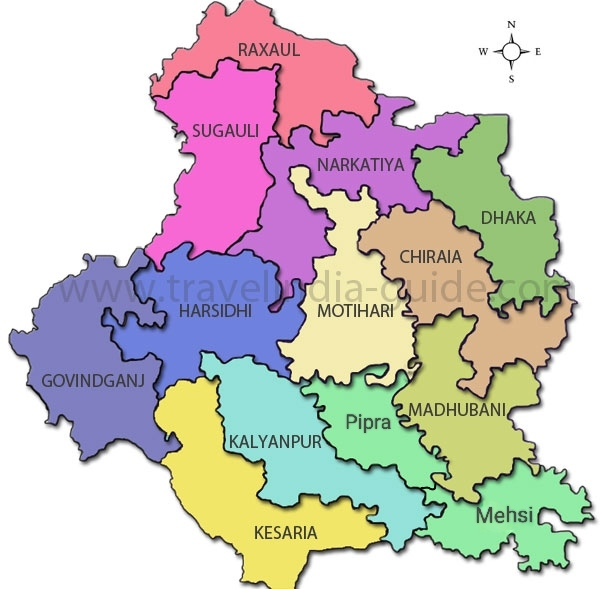
- From top, left to right: Bhimalpur Forest, Mirza Halim Shah Dargah, litchi orchards, pearl button industry and Public Dimand: Mehsi Assembly Constituency covering, GI Tag and Mehsi Subdivision
- Interactive map of Mehsi
- Location in Bihar, India Mehsi (India)
- Coordinates: 26°21′30″N 85°06′48″E
- Country: India
- State: Bihar
- District: East Champaran
- Division: Tirhut division
- Founder: Mirza Halim Shah
- Named for: Mahesh Ray

Government
  - Type: Municipal governance in India
  - Body: Mehsi Nagar Parishad
- Elevation: 64 m (210 ft)

Population (2011)
  - Mehsi (city): 41,587
  - Mehsi (Community Development Block): 188,995
- Demonym: Mehsiwashi

Languages
  - Official: Hindi, Urdu
  - Regional: Bhojpuri
- Time zone: UTC+5:30 (IST)
- PIN: 845426
- Telephone code: 06257
- ISO 3166 code: IN-BR
- Vehicle registration: BR-05
- Sex ratio: 915 females per 1,000 males
- Literacy: 52.08%
- Lok Sabha constituency: Purvi Champaran (Lok Sabha constituency)
- Vidhan Sabha constituency: Pipra
- Major industries: Pearl button industry, fruit trade, agriculture
- Website: eastchamparan.nic.in

Mehsi (/ˈmeɪhsi/; pronounced Mayh-see) is a town and Nagar Parishad in the East Champaran district of the Indian state of Bihar. Situated in the Tirhut division on the National Highway 27 corridor, it is an important commercial, agricultural and transportation centre of northern Bihar and East Champaran district, serving the surrounding region through its road and railway connectivity.

Mehsi is widely recognised for its litchi orchards, fruit trade and historic pearl button industry. The town forms part of Bihar's litchi-producing belt, a product recognised under the Government of India's One District One Product (ODOP) initiative for East Champaran. The East Champaran district administration describes the Mehsi pearl button industry as a unique traditional industry that has provided employment to thousands of people and contributed significantly to the local economy.

Owing to its strategic location between Muzaffarpur, Sheohar and northern East Champaran, Mehsi has developed as an important urban, market and service centre for the surrounding region. The town also has historical significance in the Champaran Satyagraha, where Mahatma Gandhi received a public welcome at Mehsi railway station on 15 April 1917 before proceeding to Motihari.

== Urban significance ==
Mehsi is one of the prominent urban centres of the subdivision and serves as a commercial and service hub for surrounding rural areas. Its municipal status, railway connectivity and market activities contribute to its regional importance within East Champaran district.

== Economy ==
Agriculture, horticulture, trade and small-scale industries form the backbone of Mehsi's economy. The town lies within the North Bihar litchi-producing belt, which is part of one of the largest litchi-producing regions in India, with Bihar being a leading producer of the crop.

Mehsi functions as a local aggregation and trading point for agricultural produce from surrounding rural areas, particularly litchi during the harvest season. The produce is transported to major markets across India through road connectivity and the Muzaffarpur–Gorakhpur railway corridor via Mehsi railway station.

The district economy of East Champaran is predominantly agricultural, with strong market linkages supporting trade and distribution networks in rural towns such as Mehsi.

Mehsi is also associated with small-scale industries, particularly the pearl button manufacturing cluster, which is recognised as a notable rural industry in the region.

== Transport ==
Mehsi is connected by road and rail networks. Mehsi railway station lies on the Muzaffarpur–Motihari rail route under the Samastipur railway division. The town is connected to nearby urban centres including Motihari, Muzaffarpur, Sheohar and Patna through regional highways.

== Geography ==
Mehsi is located at 26°21′28″N 85°6′48″E in the East Champaran district of the Indian state of Bihar. The town lies on the banks of the Budhi Gandak River and is situated about 41 km southeast of Motihari, the district headquarters, and about 105 km northwest of the state capital Patna. Mehsi is located near the boundary of East Champaran and Muzaffarpur district and serves as an important gateway to the Champaran region due to its location on National Highway 27 and the Barauni–Gorakhpur line railway route.

== Climate ==
Climate data for Mehsi
Month	Jan	Feb	Mar	Apr	May	Jun	Jul	Aug	Sep	Oct	Nov	Dec	Year
Record high °C (°F)	29 (84)	33 (91)	38 (100)	42 (108)	44 (111)	42 (108)	36 (97)	35 (95)	35 (95)	34 (93)	32 (90)	29 (84)	44 (111)
Record low °C (°F)	5 (41)	6 (43)	10 (50)	15 (59)	20 (68)	23 (73)	24 (75)	24 (75)	22 (72)	18 (64)	10 (50)	6 (43)	5 (41)

=== Demographics ===
Location of Bihar in India

Historical population
Year	Pop.	±%
1991	16,540	—
2001	21,482	+29.9%
2011	25,995	+21.0%
2021	41,380	+59.2%
Data up to 2011 is based on the Census of India. The 2021 figure is an estimate. Source: Census of India

=== Sex ratio and literacy ===
According to the 2011 Census of India,

- Males: 52%
- Females: 48%
- Average literacy rate: 69.6%
- Male literacy: 75.4%
- Female literacy: 63.3%

The literacy rate of Mehsi was higher than the national average at the time of the census.

=== Age structure ===
Children below the age of six years constituted approximately 16% of the population.

=== Languages ===
The principal languages spoken in Mehsi include:

- Bhojpuri
- Maithili
- Hindi
- Urdu

Bhojpuri and Maithili are widely spoken in the region, while Hindi serves as the language of administration and education. Urdu is also spoken by a section of the population.

== Tourism ==
=== Bhimalpur Forest ===
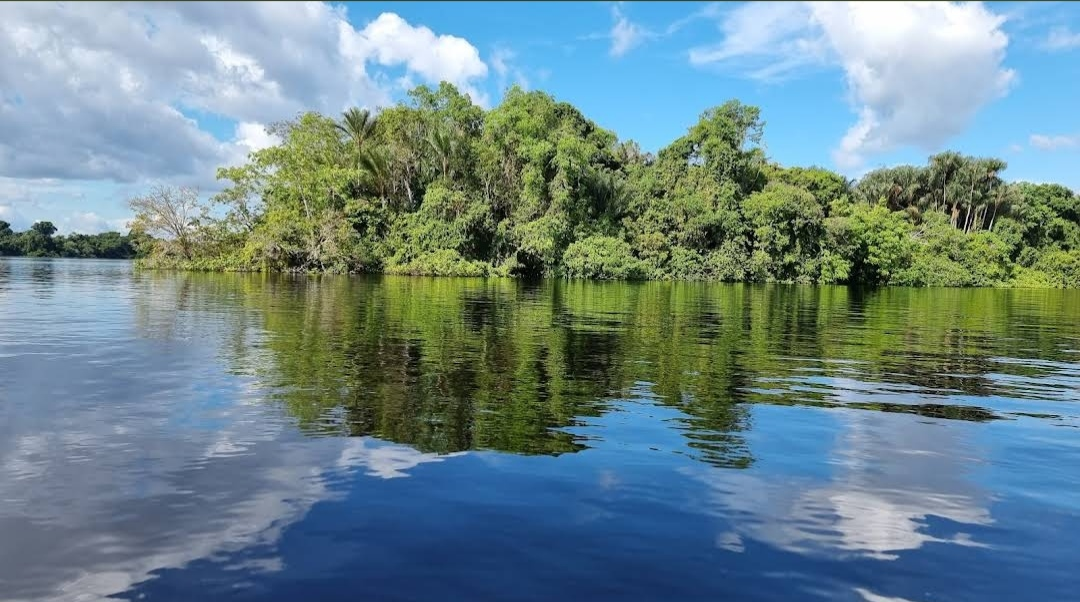
Bhimalpur Forest near Mehsi

Bhimalpur Forest, situated near Mehsi, is being developed as a biodiversity park and eco-tourism destination under various government initiatives. The forest area is known for its greenery, plantation zones, and environmental significance in the region.

Plans for nature safari, tourism infrastructure, and beautification projects have also been proposed for the forest area.

The forest has gradually developed into a local tourist attraction in East Champaran district.

=== Shrine ===
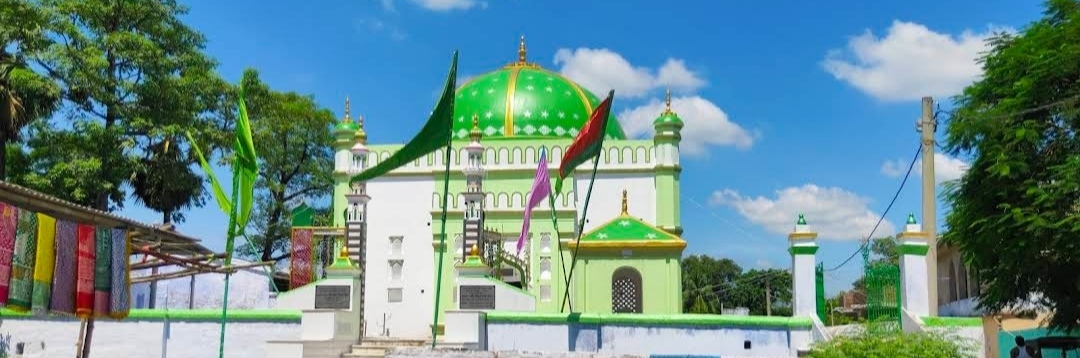
Mirza Halim Shah Dargah, Mehsi

The Mirza Halim Shah Dargah is one of the most prominent religious and cultural landmarks in Mehsi. The shrine is dedicated to the Sufi saint Mirza Halim Shah and attracts devotees from different communities across Bihar and neighbouring regions throughout the year.

An annual Urs Mela is organised at the dargah, drawing thousands of pilgrims and visitors who participate in religious observances and cultural activities. The event has become one of the major gatherings in the region and contributes to the local economy through trade and tourism.

The shrine is also regarded as a symbol of Mehsi's Sufi heritage and communal harmony, where people from different backgrounds visit to offer prayers and pay their respects. The annual fair further supports local businesses and promotes the town's cultural identity.

=== Litchi Orchards ===
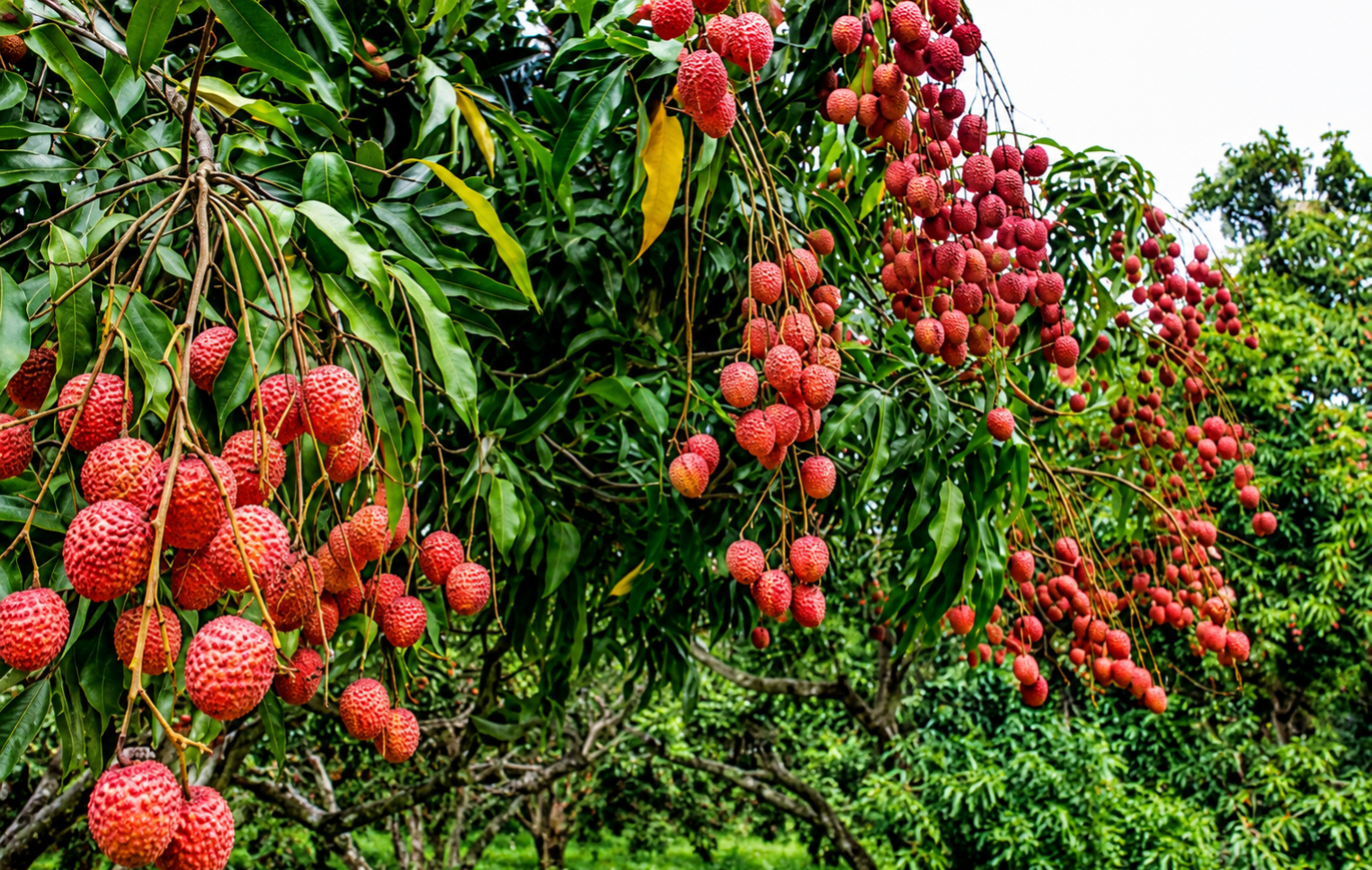

Mehsi and its surrounding rural areas are known for litchi cultivation, which forms an important part of the local agricultural economy. During the harvesting season, orchards in and around Mehsi become popular among visitors and traders.

The fertile plains of the Budhi Gandak region support large-scale fruit cultivation, especially litchi Orchards and mango orchards, contributing to the agricultural tourism potential of the area.

== Notable people ==
- Nand Lal Chaudhary – Indian politician associated with Bihar state politics. from Mehsi, East Champaran.
- Awadhesh Prasad Kushwaha – Indian politician associated with regional politics in Bihar.
- Pradeep Pandey – Bhojpuri film actor and singer from Mehsi, East Champaran.
- Shyambabu Prasad Yadav – Indian politician and Member of the Bihar Legislative Assembly from East Champaran district.

== Education ==
Mehsi serves as an important educational centre for the north-western part of East Champaran district. The town has government and private institutions providing primary, secondary and undergraduate education, attracting students from Mehsi and surrounding villages and blocks. Schools are primarily affiliated with the Bihar School Examination Board (BSEB), while some institutions follow the Central Board of Secondary Education (CBSE) curriculum.

=== Higher education ===
Mahatma Gandhi College is affiliated with Babasaheb Bhimrao Ambedkar Bihar University, Muzaffarpur. The college offers undergraduate programmes in Arts, Science and Commerce and serves students from Mehsi and neighbouring parts of East Champaran district.
