= Bihar =

State in eastern India

- State
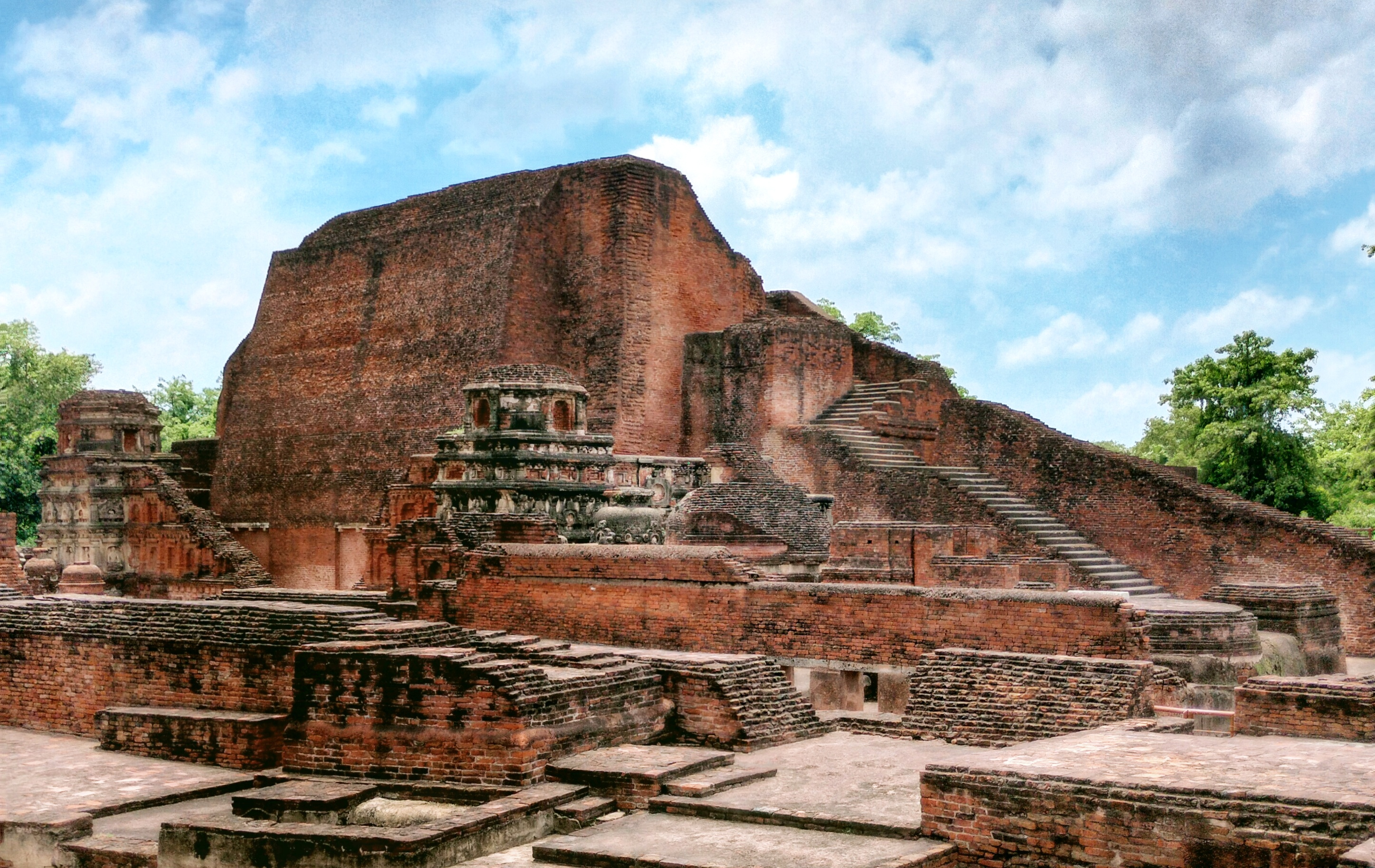
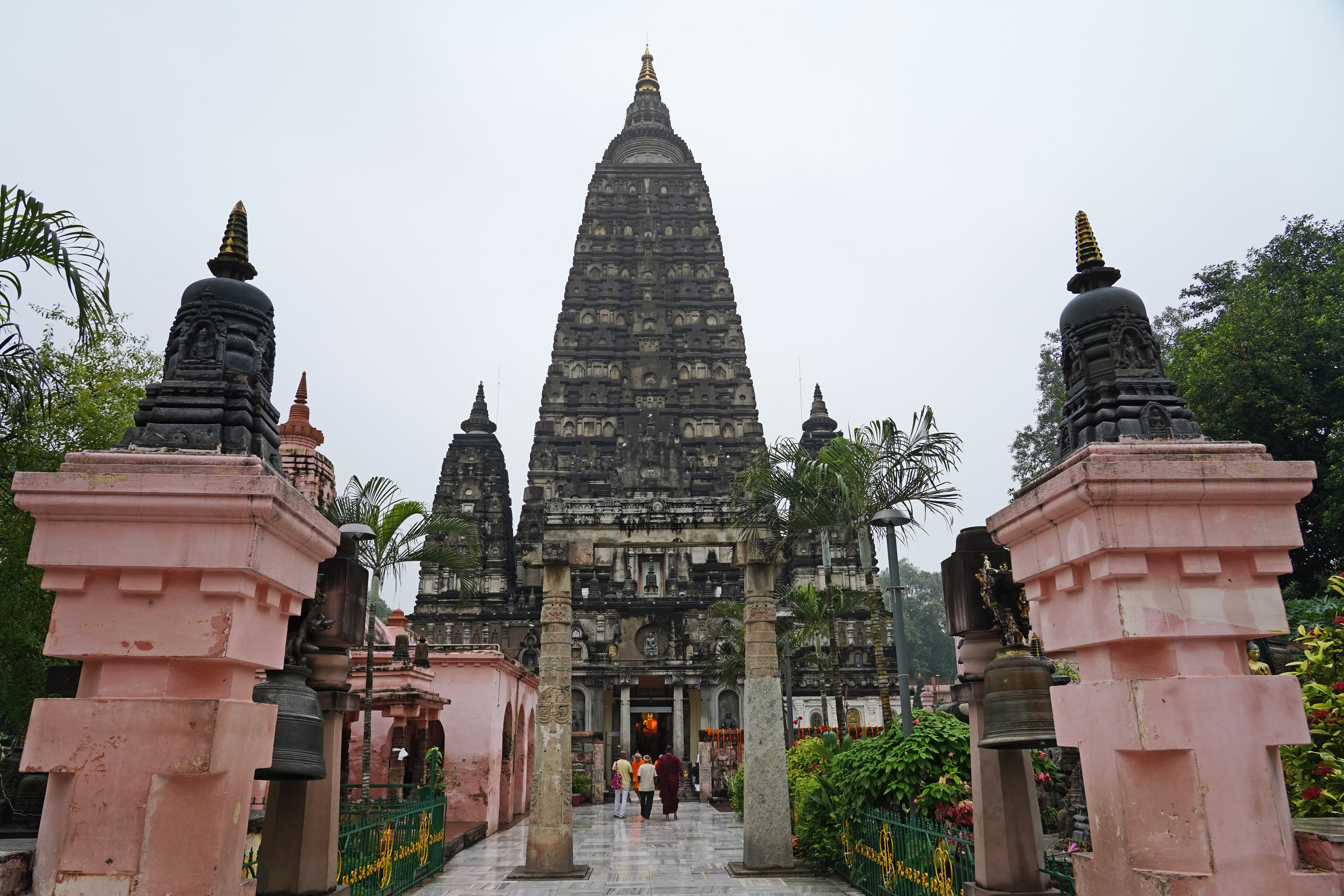
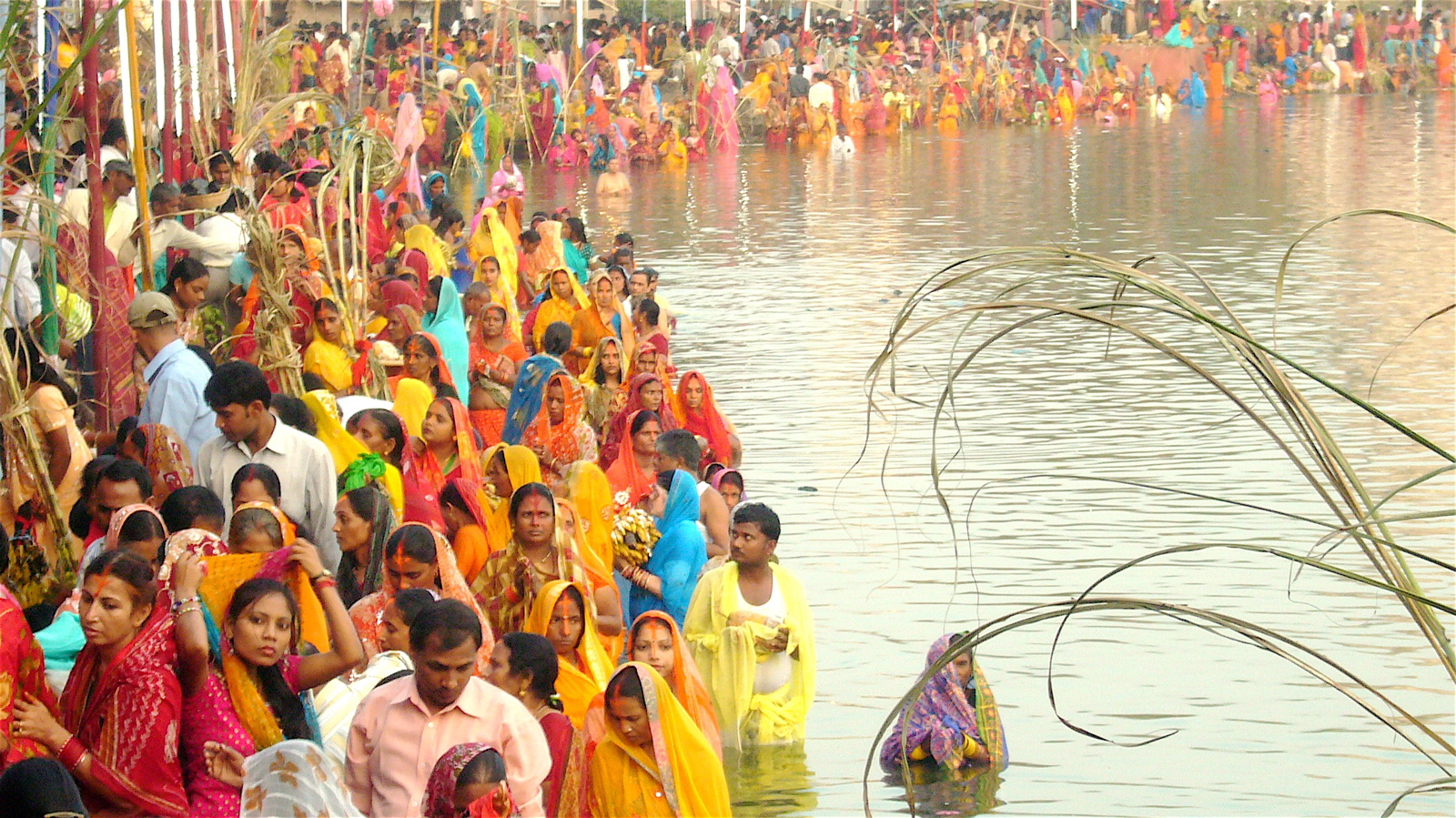
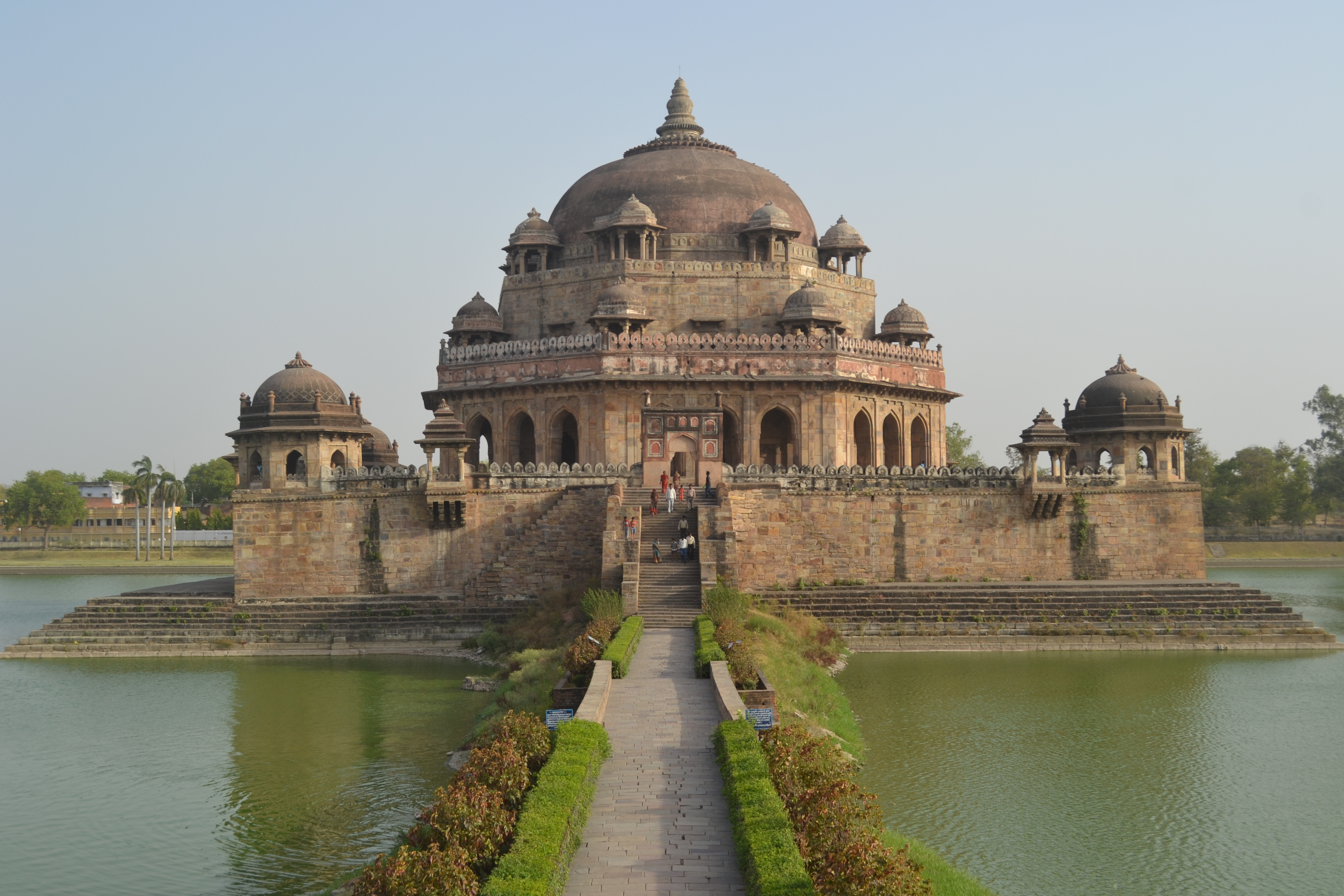
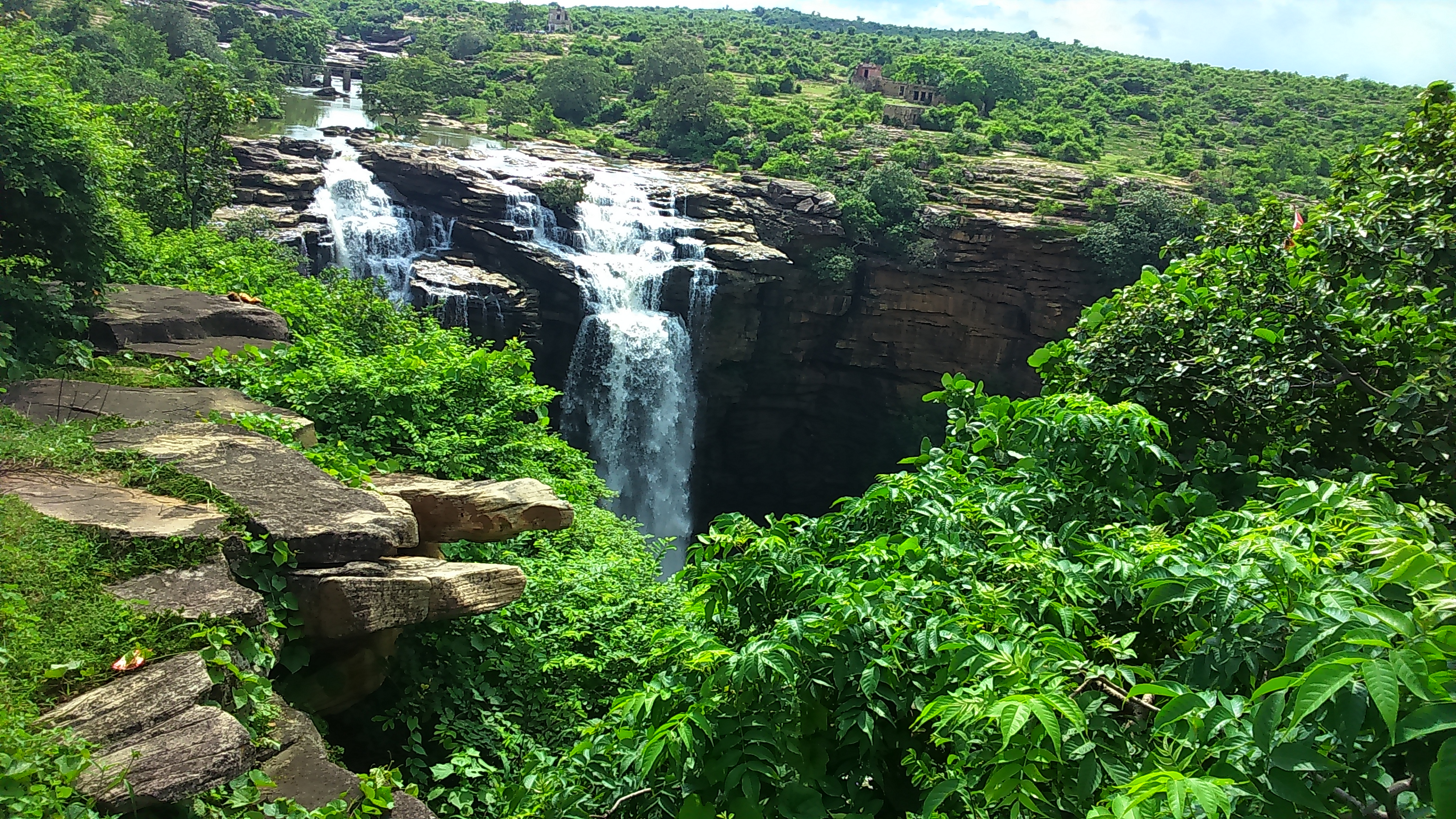
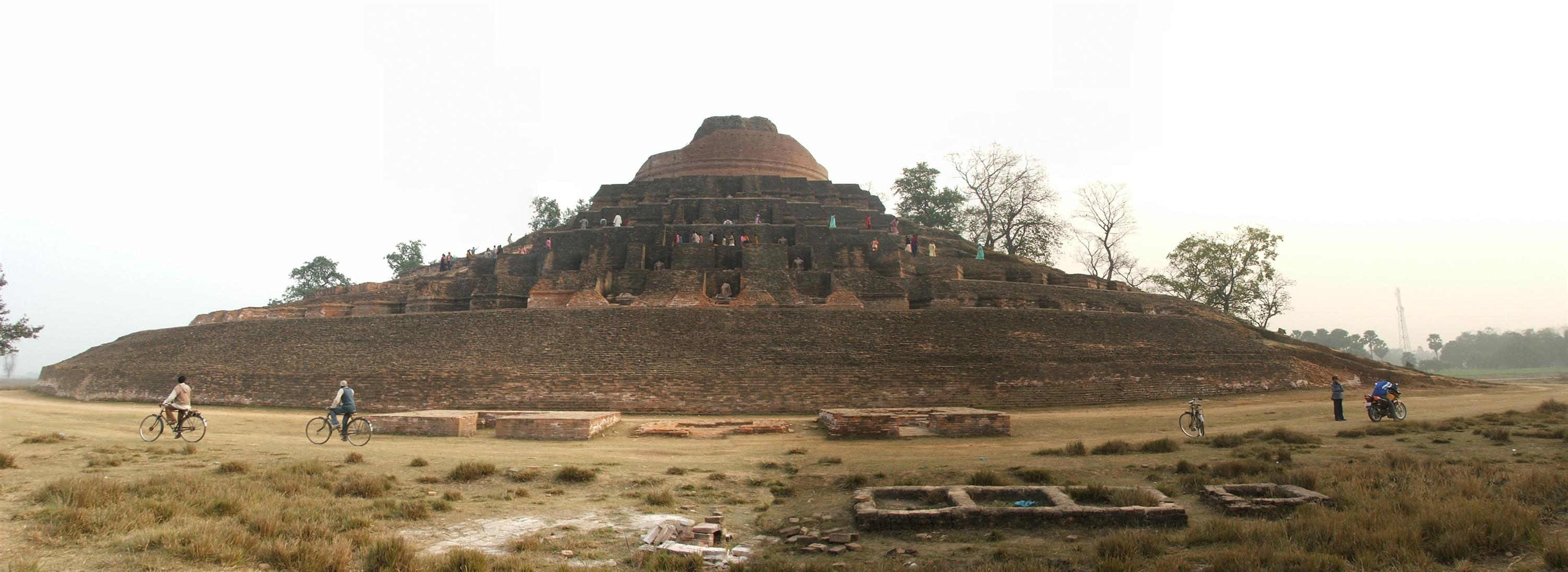
- Nalanda Mahavihara Mahabodhi Temple Chhath Sher Shah Suri Tomb Dhua Kund Kesaria stupa

- Emblem of Bihar
- Nickname: "Land of Monasteries"
- Motto: Satyameva Jayate (Truth alone triumphs)
- Anthem: Mere Bharat Ke Kanthahar (The Garland of My India)
- Location of Bihar in India
- Coordinates: 25.4°N 85.1°E
- Country: India
- Region: East India
- Previously was: Bihar Province
- Formation: 22 March 1912
- Capital and largest city: Patna
- Districts: 38

Government
  - Body: Government of Bihar
  - Governor: Syed Ata Hasnain
  - Chief Minister: Samrat Choudhary (BJP)
  - Deputy Chief Minister: Vijay Kumar Chaudhary (JD(U)); Bijendra Prasad Yadav (JD(U))

Area
  - Total: 98,940 km^{2} (38,200 sq mi)
  - Rank: 12th

Dimensions
  - Length: 345 km (214 mi)
  - Width: 483 km (300 mi)
- Elevation: 53 m (174 ft)
- Highest elevation (Someshwar Fort): 880 m (2,890 ft)
- Lowest elevation (Ganges River): 11 m (36 ft)

Population (2022 census)
  - Total: ▲130,725,310
  - Rank: 2nd
  - Density: 1,388/km^{2} (3,590/sq mi)
  - Urban: 16.2%
  - Rural: 83.8%
- Demonym: Bihari

Language
  - Official: Hindi
  - Additional official: Urdu
  - Official script: Devanagari script

GDP
  - Total (2026-27): ▲₹13.1 lakh crore (US$140 billion) (nominal) ▲ ~$560 billion (PPP)
  - Rank: 14th
  - Per capita: ▲ ~₹98,500 (US$1,100) (nominal) (2026 est.) (Note: Based on an estimated population of 133 million for Bihar in 2026, the per capita figure has been calculated approximately.) ▲ ~$4,060 (PPP) (33rd)
- Time zone: UTC+05:30 (IST)
- ISO 3166 code: IN-BR
- Vehicle registration: BR
- HDI (2023): ▲0.650 (Medium) (36th)
- Literacy (2024): 74.3% (35th)
- Sex ratio (2023): 1090♀/1000 ♂
- Website: state.bihar.gov.in
- Symbols of Bihar
- Foundation day: Bihar Day
- Bird: House sparrow
- Fish: Walking catfish
- Flower: Marigold
- Fruit: Mango
- Mammal: Gaur
- Tree: Peepal tree
- State highway mark
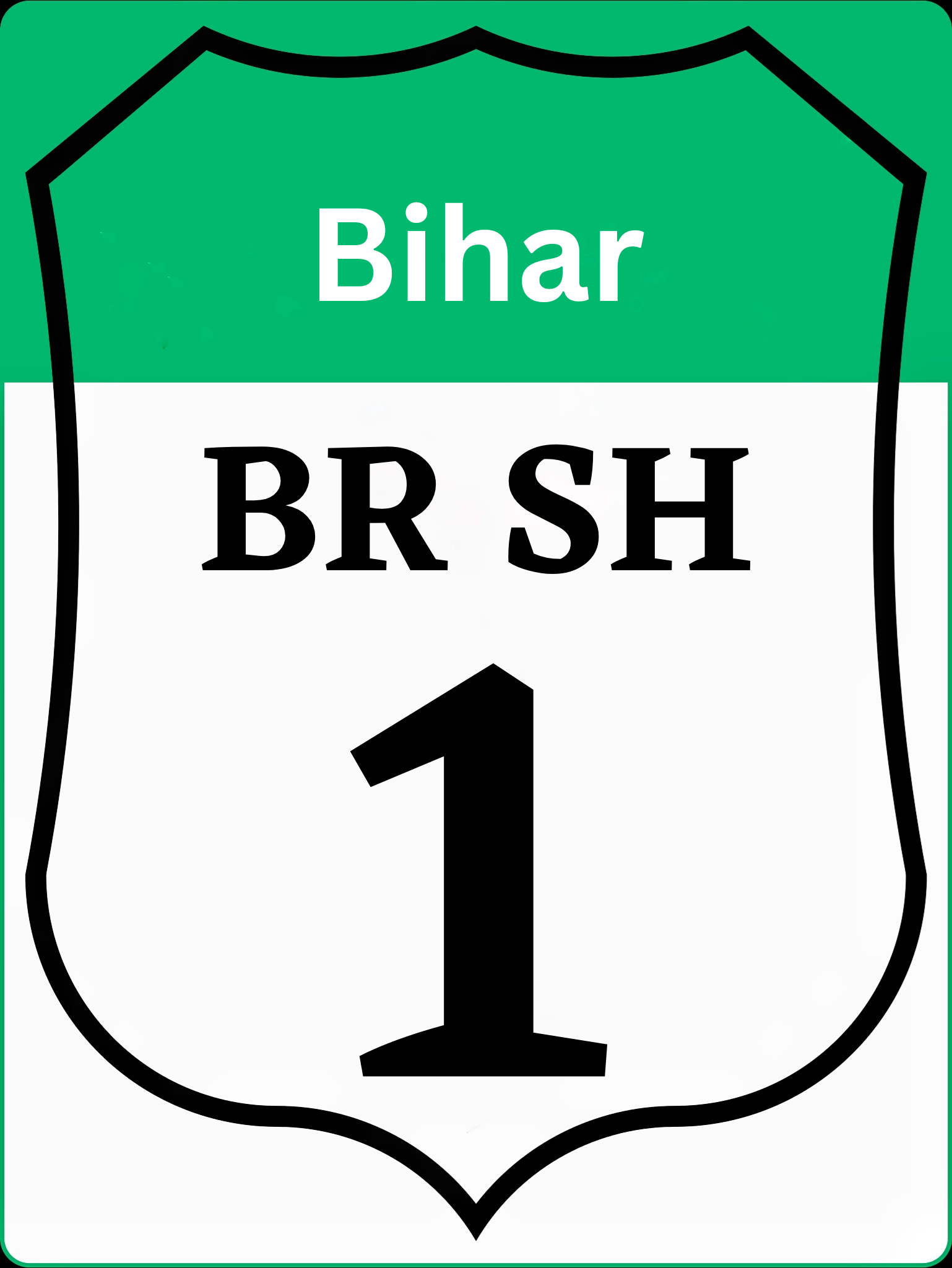
- State highway of Bihar; BR SH1 - BR SH82
- List of Indian state symbols

Part of a series on the
History of Bihar
Ancient History
Prehistoric and Vedic Era

- Chirand (Neolithic) - Vedic period - Videha - Mithila (ancient) - Anga - Kikata

Urbanisation and Shramana

- Second Urbanisation - Rise of Shramana - Buddhism • Jainism • Ajivika

Gaṇasaṅghas

- Magadha - Vajjika League

  - Nāya
  - Vajji (tribe)
  - Licchavis of Vaishali

- Malla (tribe) - Kashi - Bulis

Imperial Magadha

- Brihadratha dynasty - Haryanka dynasty

  - Bimbisara
  - Ajatashatru

- Shishunaga dynasty - Nanda Empire

  - Mahapadma Nanda

- Maurya Empire

  - Chandragupta Maurya
  - Ashoka
Post-Mauryan and Smriti

- Shunga Empire

  - Pushyamitra Shunga

- Kanva dynasty - Development of Smriti - Brahmanical Revival

The Interregnum

- Kushan Influence - Mitra Dynasty - Resurgence of Licchavis

Classical and medieval
The Classical Age

- Gupta Empire

Early Medieval

- Later Gupta dynasty - Maukharis

Pala Era and Feudatories

- Pala Empire - Khayaravala dynasty - Pithipatis of Magadha

Medieval Mithila

- Karnats of Mithila - Oiniwar dynasty

Islamic Incursions

- Delhi Sultanate

Centers of Learning

- Nalanda - Vikramashila - Odantapuri - Telhara monastery

Early-modern
Afghan and Mughal Rule

- Sur Empire

  - Sher Shah Suri

- Mughal Empire

  - Bihar Subah
Regional Chieftaincies

- Chakwars - Chero dynasty - Gidhaur chieftaincy - Kharagpur Raj - Khokhra chieftaincy

Major Zamindari Estates

- Bettiah Raj - Khandavala dynasty - Dumraon Raj - Hathwa Raj - Jagdishpur estate

Colonial & Independence Era
Colonial Rule (1764–1947)

- Battle of Buxar (1764) - East India Company - Permanent Settlement (1793) - Santhal rebellion - Indian Rebellion of 1857

  - Kunwar Singh

- Bihar famine of 1873–74 - Bihar Province (Est. 1912) - 1934 Nepal–Bihar earthquake

Freedom Struggle

- Champaran Satyagraha (1917) - Salt Satyagraha - Bihar Vidyapeeth - Kisan Sabha

  - Swami Sahajanand Saraswati

- Quit India Movement

  - Azad Dasta
Modern Era (Post-1947)
Congress Era (1947–1967)

- Sri Krishna Sinha - Anugrah Narayan Sinha - Zamindari Abolition

Socialist and JP Era (1967–1989)

- Karpoori Thakur - Bihar Movement (1974) - Jayaprakash Narayan - Bhagalpur riots (1989)

RJD Era (1990–2005)

- Lalu Prasad Yadav - Rabri Devi - Fodder Scam

State Division (2000)

- Bihar Reorganisation Act, 2000 - Creation of Jharkhand

NDA Era (2005–Present)

- Nitish Kumar - Politics of Bihar

Culture, art, and society
Art and architecture

- Mahabodhi Temple - Nalanda - Barabar Caves - Tomb of Sher Shah Suri - Rohtas Fort - Golghar - Mithila Painting - Patna Qalam - Manjusha Art - Didarganj Yakshi

Society and language

- Bihari culture - Mithila • Magadh • Anga - Bihari languages

  - Maithili • Magahi
  - Bhojpuri • Angika
Religion

- Religion in Bihar - Buddhism in Bihar - Jainism in Bihar - Islam in Bihar - Sikhism in Bihar

Portal India Portal Bihar

Bihar (Hindi: Bihār, pronounced [bɪˈɦaːr]) is a state in eastern India. It borders Uttar Pradesh to its west, Nepal to the north, the northern part of West Bengal to the east, and Jharkhand to the south. Bihar is split by the river Ganges, which flows from west to east. It is the second largest state by population, the 12th largest by area, and the 14th largest by GDP in 2024. Bihar's official languages are Hindi and Urdu. The main native languages are Maithili, Magahi and Bhojpuri, but there are several other languages being spoken at smaller levels.

Bihar played a central role in the history and development of Buddhism. According to Buddhist tradition, the Buddha attained enlightenment in Bodh Gaya at the Mahabodhi Temple, a UNESCO World Heritage Site. Early Buddhist schools, such as Nalanda and Vikramashila emerged in Bihar as major centres of Buddhist learning, attracting students and scholars from across Asia. Under dynasties including the Mauryas and Guptas, Buddhism received royal patronage and expanded from the region to other parts of Asia.

Since the late 1970s, Bihar has lagged far behind other Indian states in terms of social and economic development. Economists and social scientists claim that this is a direct result of the policies of the central government, such as the freight equalisation policy, its apathy towards Bihar, lack of Bihari sub-nationalism, and the Permanent Settlement of 1793 by the British East India Company. The state government has, however, made significant strides in developing the state. Improved governance has led to an economic revival in the state through increased investment in infrastructure, better healthcare facilities, greater emphasis on education, and a reduction in crime and corruption.

== Etymology ==
The name Bihar is generally believed to derive from the Sanskrit and Pali word vihāra (विहार), meaning "monastery" or "religious dwelling". The region was an important centre of Buddhism from the Mauryan period onward and was home to numerous Buddhist monastic establishments, including those at Nalanda and Vikramashila. Medieval Persian and Turkic writers applied the name Bihar to the area, a form thought to have evolved from vihāra. The name subsequently came to designate the wider region and was retained for the modern state.

== History ==
=== Ancient period ===
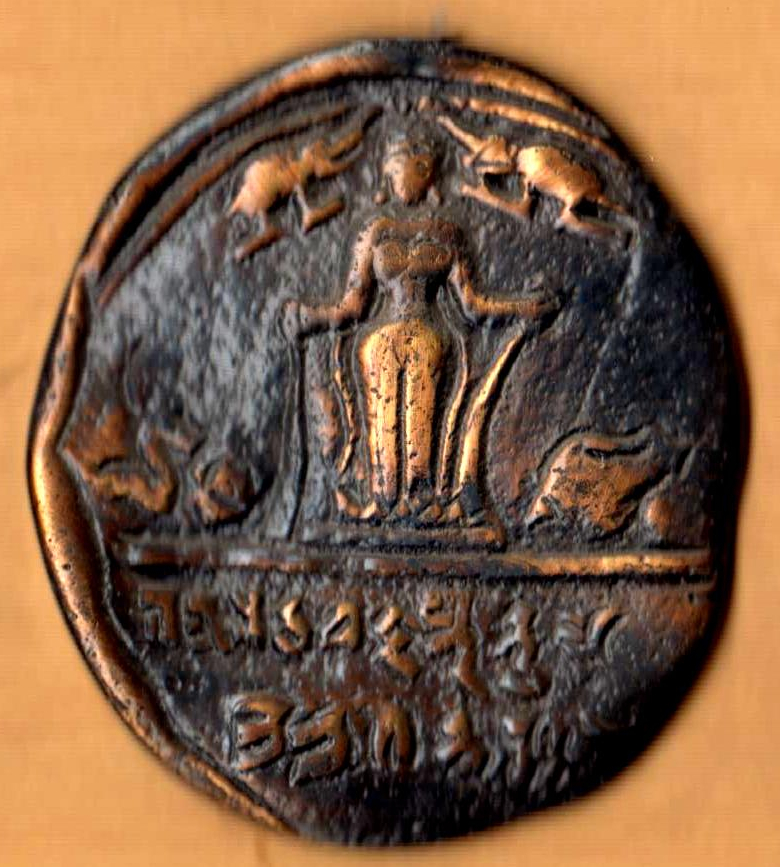
Copy of the seal excavated from Kundpur, Vaishali

Chirand, on the northern bank of the Ganga River, in Saran district, has an archaeological record from the Neolithic age (c. 2500–1345 BCE). Regions of Bihar – such as Magadha, Mithila, and Anga – are mentioned in religious texts and epics of ancient India.

Mithila gained prominence after the establishment of the Videha Kingdom. During the late Vedic period (c. 1100–500 BCE), Videha became one of the major political and cultural centers of South Asia, along with Kuru and Pañcāla. The kings of the Videha Kingdom were called Janakas. Sita, a daughter of one of the Janakas of Mithila is mentioned as the consort of Rama, in the Hindu epic Ramayana, written by Valmiki. The Videha Kingdom later became incorporated into the Vajjika League which had its capital in the city of Vaishali, which is also in Mithila. Vajji had a republican form of government where the head of state was elected from the rajas. Based on the information found in texts pertaining to Jainism and Buddhism, Vajji was established as a republic by the sixth century BCE, before the birth of Gautama Buddha in 563 BCE, making it the first known republic in India.

The Haryanka dynasty, founded in 684 BCE, ruled Magadha from the city of Rajgriha (modern Rajgir). The two well-known kings from this dynasty were Bimbisara and his son Ajatashatru, who imprisoned his father to ascend the throne. Ajatashatru founded the city of Pataliputra which later became the capital of Magadha. He declared war and conquered the Vajjika League. The Haryanka dynasty was followed by the Shishunaga dynasty. Later, the Nanda dynasty ruled a vast tract stretching from Punjab to Odisha.

The Nanda dynasty was replaced by the Maurya Empire, India's first empire. The Maurya Empire and the religion of Buddhism arose in the region that now makes up modern Bihar. The Mauryan Empire, which originated from Magadha in 321 BCE, was founded by Chandragupta Maurya, who was born in Magadha. It had its capital at Pataliputra (modern Patna). Mauryan Emperor Ashoka, who was born in Pataliputra (Patna), is often considered to be among the most accomplished rulers in world history.

The Gupta Empire, which originated in Magadha in 240 CE, is referred to as the Golden Age of India in science, mathematics, astronomy, commerce, religion, and Indian philosophy. Bihar and Bengal were invaded by Rajendra Chola I of the Chola dynasty in the 11th century.

=== Medieval period ===
Buddhism in Magadha declined due to the invasion of Muhammad bin Bakhtiyar Khalji, during which many of the viharas were destroyed along with the universities of Nalanda and Vikramashila. Some historians believe that thousands of Buddhist monks were massacred during the 12th century. D. N. Jha suggests, instead, that these incidents were the result of Buddhist–Brahmin skirmishes in a fight for supremacy. After the rule of the Pala Empire, the Karnat dynasty came into power in the Mithila region in the 11th century and they were succeeded by the Oiniwar dynasty in the 14th century. Aside from Mithila, there were other small kingdoms in medieval Bihar. The area around Bodh Gaya and much of Magadha came under the Buddhist Pithipatis of Bodh Gaya. The Khayaravala dynasty were present in the southwestern portions of the state until the 13th century.

Many famous Buddhist and Hindu philosophers and scholars have originated or studied in Bihar during the period from the 5th to 13th century at institutions like Nalanda and Vikramashila including Kamalaśīla, Ratnākaraśānti, Śāntarakṣita, Abhayakaragupta, Udayana and Gaṅgeśa.

Sasaram was also the first capital city of the Sur Empire founded by the ruler of Bihar, Sultan Sher Shah Suri who was Pashtun.

=== Colonial era ===
After the Battle of Buxar (1764), the British East India Company obtained the diwani rights (rights to administer and collect tax revenue) for Bihar, Bengal, and Odisha. The rich resources of fertile land, water, and skilled labour had attracted the foreign imperialists, particularly the Dutch and British, in the 18th century. A number of agriculture-based industries had been started in Bihar by foreign entrepreneurs. Bihar remained a part of the Bengal Presidency of British India until 1912, when Bihar and Orissa were carved out of the Bengal Presidency to form a new province.

=== Pre- and post-Independence ===
Farmers in Champaran had revolted against indigo cultivation in 1914 (at Pipra) and 1916 (Turkaulia). In April 1917, Mahatma Gandhi visited Champaran, where Raj Kumar Shukla had drawn his attention to the exploitation of the peasants by European indigo planters. The Champaran Satyagraha that followed received support from many Bihari nationalists, such as Rajendra Prasad, Shri Krishna Sinha and Anugrah Narayan Sinha.

In the northern and central regions of Bihar, the Kisan Sabha (peasant movement) was an important consequence of the independence movement. It began in 1929 under the leadership of Swami Sahajanand Saraswati who formed the Bihar Provincial Kisan Sabha (BPKS), to mobilise peasant grievances against the zamindari attacks on their occupancy rights. The movement intensified and spread from Bihar across the rest of India, culminating in the formation of the All India Kisan Sabha (AIKS) at the Lucknow session of the Indian National Congress in April 1936, where Saraswati was elected as its first president.

Following independence, Bihari migrant workers have faced violence and prejudice in many parts of India, such as Maharashtra, Punjab, and Assam.

Decades following the independence in 1947 were full of violent conflicts between the landless section of Bihari society and the landed elite who controlled the government at various level. This was an outcome of the failed land reform drive and improper implementation of the land ceiling laws that were passed by Indian National Congress government in the 1950s. Landed castes like Rajput and Bhumihar became suspicious of the land reforms and used their influence in government to hinder the efforts of the land redistribution programme, which may have alleviated the huge caste based income inequalities. Unscrupulous tactics such as absentee landlordism neutralised the reforms which was architected by Krishna Ballabh Sahay.

In the Zamindari areas of Bihar, such as Bhojpur district, the Dalits were also subjected to frequent humiliation and practice of begar existed. This led to first spark of mass scale naxalism to grew up in the plains of Bhojpur. This armed struggle was led initially by Master Jagdish Mahto, a school teacher turned naxalite. Soon, the struggle spread into other parts of Bihar, where the landlords and agricultural labourers locked horns against each other. Between 1950 and 2000, several massacres took place. In Bihar, unlike the other parts of India, the naxalism took the form of caste conflict as the landed section of society belonged primarily to Forward Castes and a section of Upper Backward Castes, on the other hand, the landless were the people belonging to Schedule Castes and a section of Other Backward Castes. Formation of caste based private armies called senas took place in response to violent activities of the naxalites. One of the most dreaded caste army of the landlord was Ranvir Sena, which was involved in massacres of Dalits in Laxmanpur Bathe. The Dalit struggle against these caste armies was led by Indian People's Front and its successor Communist Party of India (Marxist-Leninist) Liberation, which was controlled at the upper echelon by the middle peasant castes such as the Koeris and Yadavs, with Dalits and Extremely Backward Castes forming its mass support base and activists.

Meanwhile, the 1960s saw the rise of political instability in the state with dwindling power of Indian National Congress and rise of parties like Samyukta Socialist Party. The leaders belonging to Backward Castes became vocal for their political rights. The toppling of Mahamaya Prasad Sinha government by Jagdeo Prasad hastened the end of dominance of Forward Caste backed Indian National Congress in the state.

In 1990 the 10th Assembly elections to Bihar Legislative Assembly was held and Lalu Prasad Yadav became the Chief Minister of Bihar. He led the Janata Dal political party, which won majority in assembly elections due to strong wave of discontent against Indian National Congress.

== Geography ==
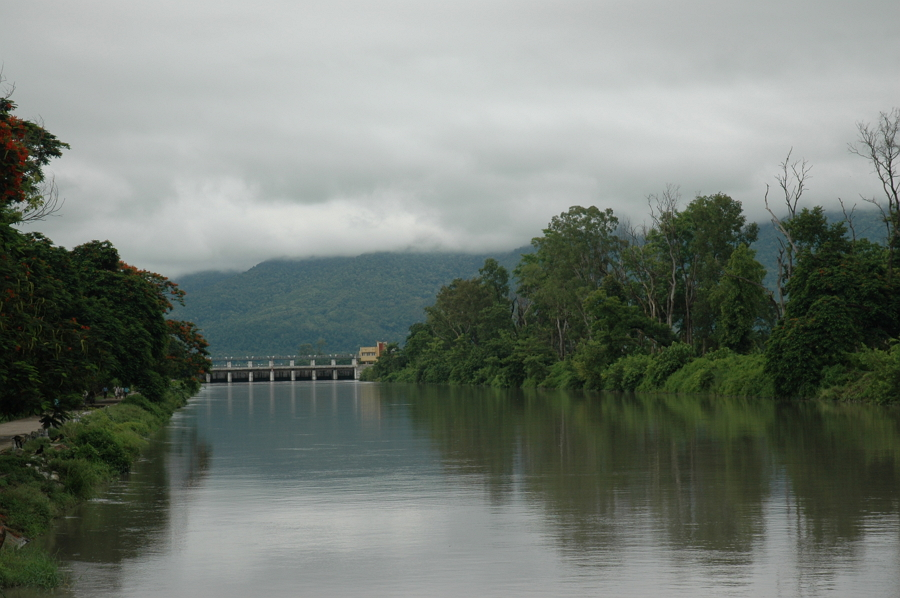
Himalayan Foothills in Valmikinagar, Bihar

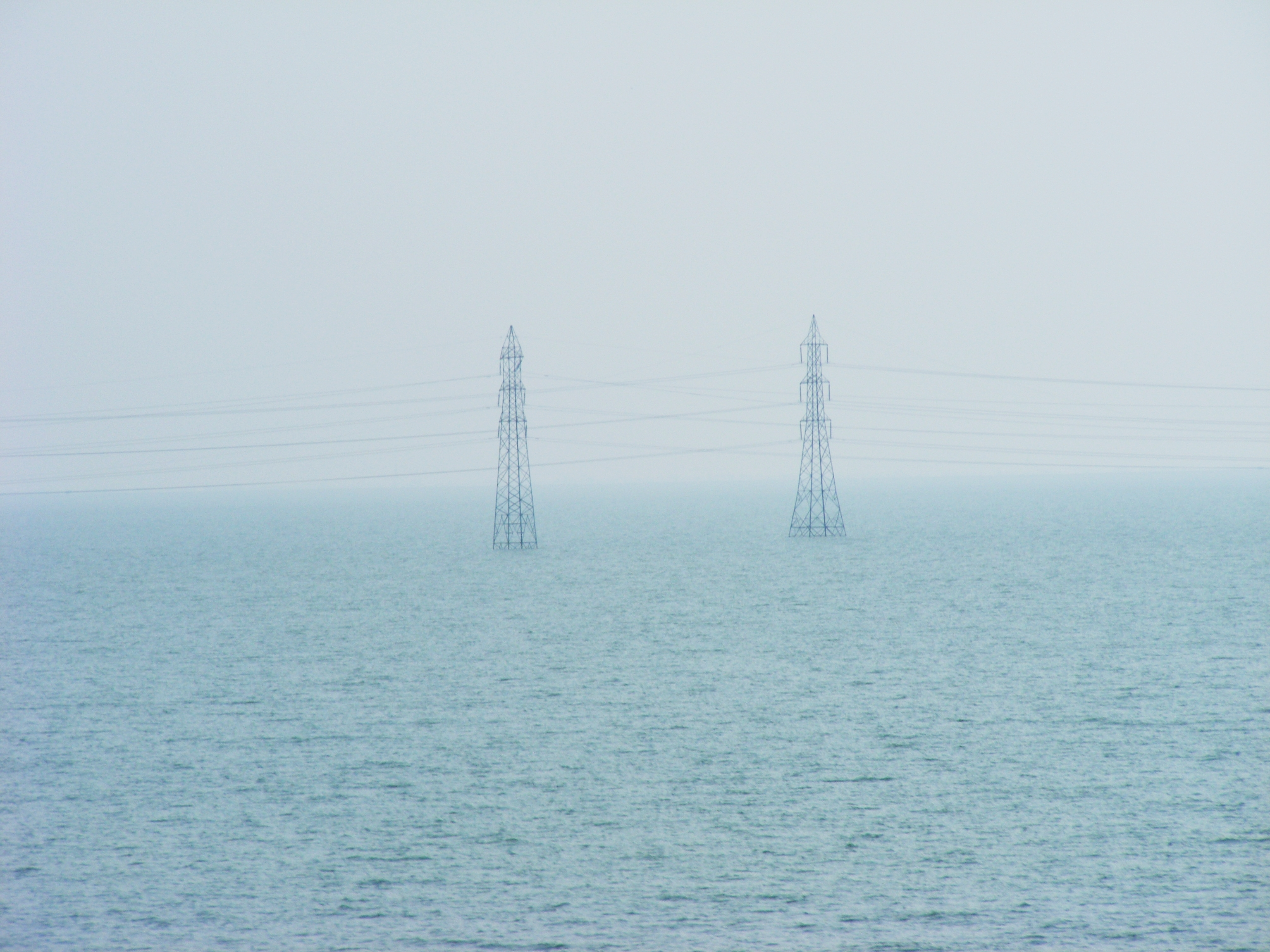
Flooded farmlands during 2008 Bihar flood

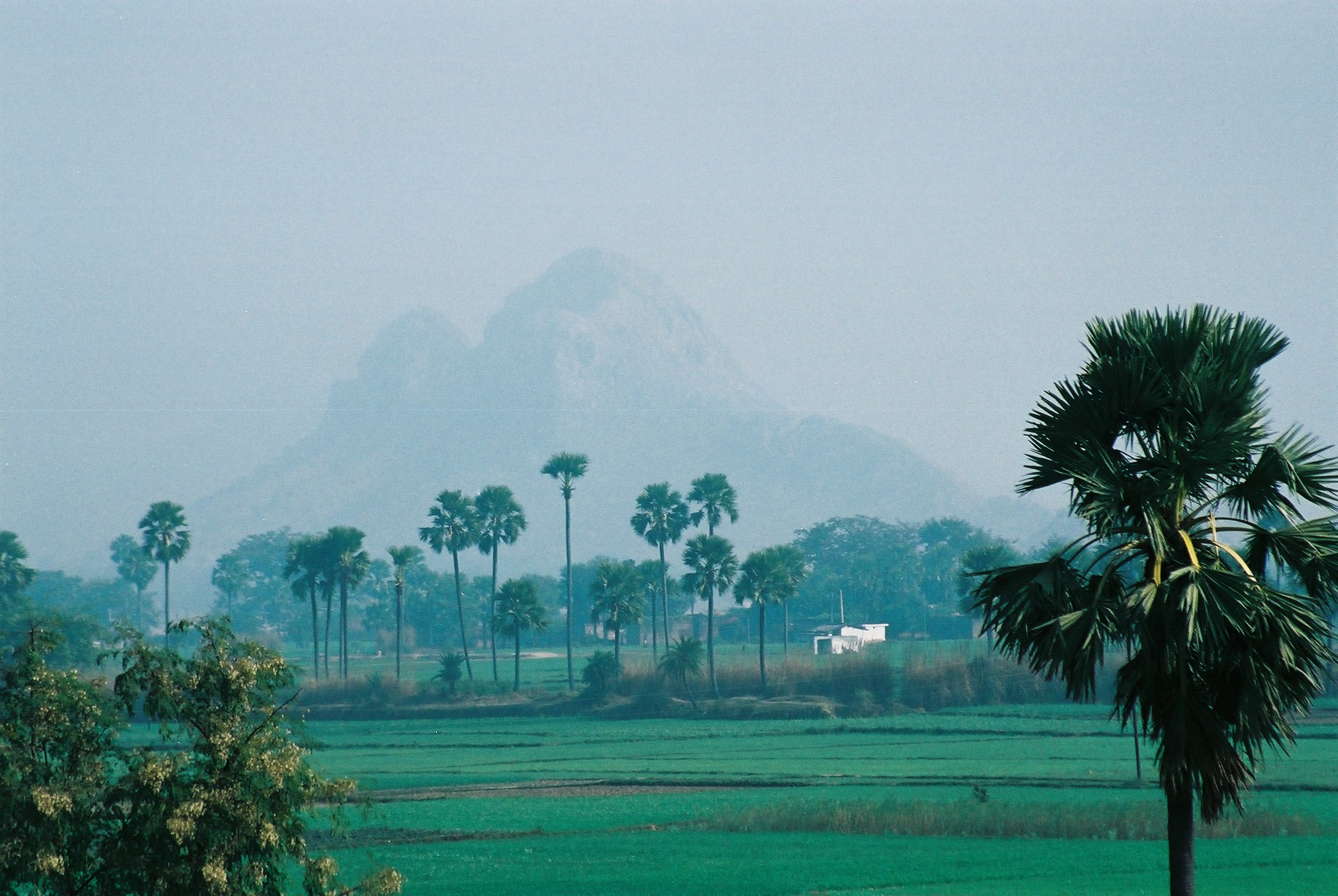
Mountain of Ashrams, Vindhya range Bodh Gaya

Climate of Bihar

Climate chart (precipitation, max. and min. temperature)
| J | F | M | A | M | J | J | A | S | O | N | D |
| 12 24 9 | 9.9 26 11 | 12 32 16 | 24 37 21 | 56 37 24 | 165 36 26 | 325 33 25 | 276 33 25 | 217 32 25 | 83 32 21 | 6.4 29 15 | 6 25 10 |
- █ Average max. and min. temperatures in °C
- █ Precipitation totals in mm
Imperial conversion
| J | F | M | A | M | J | J | A | S | O | N | D |
| 0.5 74 49 | 0.4 79 53 | 0.5 90 61 | 0.9 98 70 | 2.2 99 75 | 6.5 96 78 | 13 91 78 | 11 91 78 | 8.5 90 77 | 3.3 89 71 | 0.3 84 59 | 0.2 77 51 |
- █ Average max. and min. temperatures in °F
- █ Precipitation totals in inches

Bihar covers a total area of 94,163 km^{2} (36,357 sq mi), with an average elevation above sea level of 173 feet (53 m). It is landlocked by Nepal in the north, Jharkhand in the south, West Bengal in the east and Uttar Pradesh in the west. It has three parts on the basis of physical and structural conditions: the Southern Plateau, the Shivalik Region, and Bihar's Gangetic Plain. Furthermore, the vast stretch of the fertile Bihar Plain is divided by the Ganges River into two unequal parts – North Bihar and South Bihar. The Ganges flows west–east and, along with its tributaries, regularly floods parts of the Bihar plain. The main northern tributaries are the Gandak and Koshi, which originate in the Nepalese Himalayas, and the Bagmati, which originates in the Kathmandu Valley. Other tributaries are the Son, Budhi Gandak, Chandan, Orhani and Phalgu. Bihar has some small hills, such as the Rajgir hills in center, Kaimur Range in south-west and Shivalik Range in North. Bihar has a forest area of 6,764.14 km^{2}, which is 7.1 per cent of its geographical area. The sub-Himalayan foothills of Shivalik ranges, primary Someshwar and Dun mountain, in West Champaran district are clad in a belt of moist deciduous forest. As well as trees, this consists of brush, grasses and reeds.

Bihar lies completely in the Subtropical region of the Temperate Zone, and its climatic type is humid subtropical. Its temperature is subtropical in general, with hot summers and cold winters. Bihar has an average daily high temperature of only 26 °C with a yearly average of 26 °C. The climate is very warm, but has only a very few tropical and humid months. Several months of the year it is warm to hot at temperatures continuously above 25 °C, sometimes up to 29 °C. Due to less rain the best time for travelling is from October to April. The rainiest days occur from May to September.

=== Flora and fauna ===
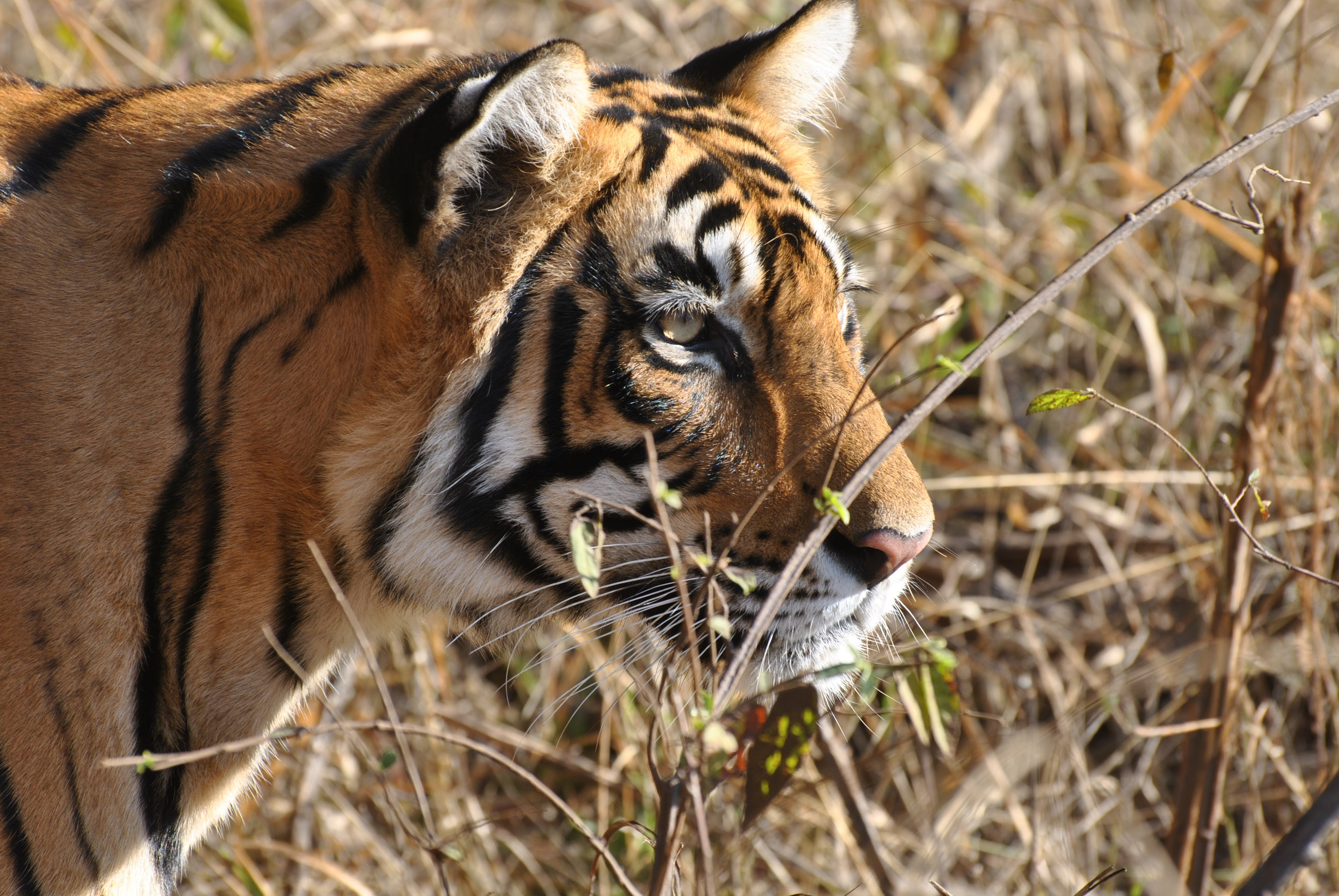
Bengal Tiger is main attraction at Valmiki Tiger Reserve.

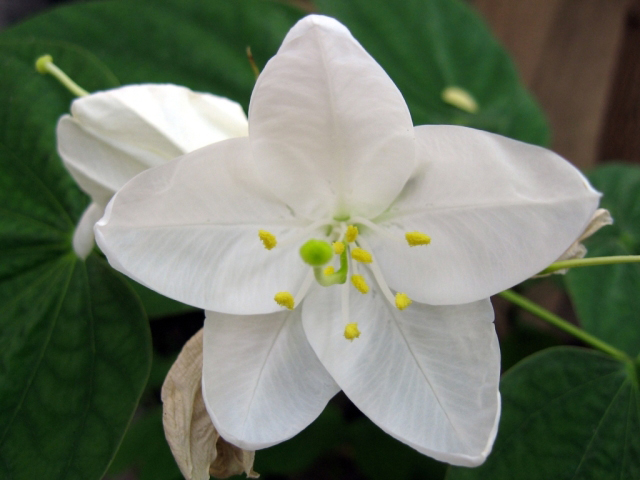
Bauhinia acuminata, locally known as Kachnaar

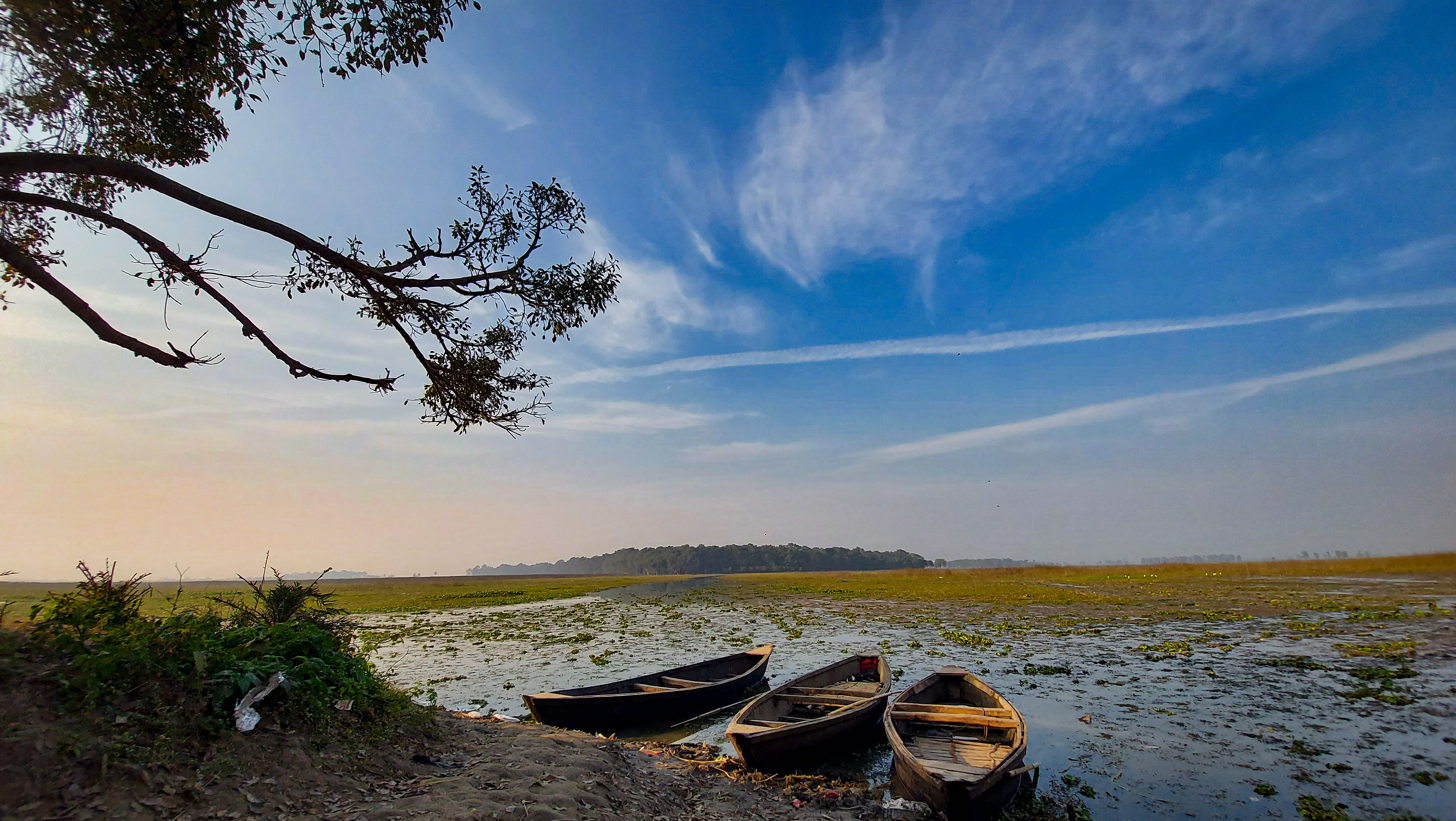
Kanwar Lake Bird Sanctuary, The only Ramsar site in Bihar

Bihar has a nature conservation area of 6,845 km^{2} (2,643 sq mi), which is 7.27% of its geographical area. The sub-Himalayan foothill of Someshwar and the Dun ranges in the Champaran district have belts of moist deciduous forests, mixed with shrubs, grass and reeds. High rainfall (above 1,600 mm [63 in]) promotes forests of Sal (Shorea robusta) in these areas. Other important trees are Sal Cedrela Toona, Khair, and Semal. Deciduous forests also occur in the Saharsa and Purnia districts, with common trees including Shorea robusta (sal), Diospyros melanoxylon (kendu), Boswellia serrata (salai), Terminalia tomentose (asan), Terminalia bellerica (bahera), Terminalia arjuna (arjun), Pterocarpus marsupium (paisar), and Madhuca indica (mahua).

Valmiki National Park covers about 800 km^{2} (309 sq mi) of forest and is the 18th Tiger Reserve of India, ranked fourth in terms of the density of its tiger population. It has a diverse landscape and biodiversity in addition to sheltering protected carnivores. Vikramshila Gangetic Dolphin Sanctuary in Bhagalpur region is a reserve for the endangered South Asian river dolphin. Other species in Bihar include leopard, bear, hyena, bison, chital and barking deer. Crocodilians including gharials and muggers as well as Gangetic turtles can be found in the river systems. Karkatgarh Waterfall on Karmanasa River is a natural habitat of the crocodilians. In 2016, the government of Bihar has accepted the proposal of the forest authorities to turn the area into a Crocodile Conservation Reserve (CCR). Other notable wildlife sanctuaries include Kaimur Wildlife Sanctuary, Bhimbandh Wildlife Sanctuary and Gautam Buddha Wildlife Sanctuary. Many varieties of local and migratory bird species can be seen in natural wetland of Kanwar Lake Bird Sanctuary, Asia's largest oxbow lake and only Ramsar site in Bihar, and other notable wetlands of Baraila lake, Kusheshwar Nath Lake, Udaypur lake.

=== Natural resources ===
Bihar is the principal holder of the country's pyrite reserves and possesses 95% of all known resources.

In May 2022, a gold mine was found in the district of Jamui. It accounts for more than 44% of the country's gold reserve, approximately 223 million tons.

== Demographics ==
Historical population
| Year | Pop. | ±% |
|---|---|---|
| 1901 | 21,243,632 | — |
| 1911 | 21,567,159 | +1.5% |
| 1921 | 21,358,905 | −1.0% |
| 1931 | 23,438,371 | +9.7% |
| 1941 | 26,302,771 | +12.2% |
| 1951 | 29,085,000 | +10.6% |
| 1961 | 34,841,000 | +19.8% |
| 1971 | 42,126,000 | +20.9% |
| 1981 | 52,303,000 | +24.2% |
| 1991 | 64,531,000 | +23.4% |
| 2001 | 82,999,000 | +28.6% |
| 2011 | 104,099,452 | +25.4% |
| 2023 | 130,725,310 | +25.6% |
Source: Census of India

At the 2011 census, Bihar was the third most populous state of India with a total population of 104,099,452. It was also India's most densely populated state, with 1,106 persons per square kilometre. The sex ratio was 1090 females per 1000 males in the year 2020. Almost 58% of Bihar's population was below 25 years age, which is the highest in India. In 2021, Bihar has had an urbanisation rate of 20%. Bihar has an adult literacy rate of 70.9% (79.7% for males and 60.5% for females) in 2017 according to NSC report 2017. According to Bihar caste survey 2023, Bihar's literacy rate grew up to 79.8% (which is 18% increase from 61.18% of Census 2011) showing remarkable growth in education sector from past decades. Population increased to 130,725,310 as per the Bihar caste survey conducted in 2023.

=== Religion ===
Religion in Bihar (2023)
1. Hinduism (82.0%)
2. Islam (17.7%)
3. Others (0.30%)

Bihar is religiously diverse, with Hinduism being the predominant religion. According to the 2011 Census of India, Hindus constituted 82.7% of the state's population, while Muslims accounted for 16.9%. Smaller religious communities include Christians, Sikhs, Buddhists, Jains, and followers of other faiths. Hindu religious traditions play a prominent role in the cultural life of Bihar. The festival of Chhath Puja, dedicated to Surya (the Sun God), is one of the most widely celebrated festivals in the state and is observed by Bihari communities worldwide.

Bihar occupies a significant place in the religious history of South Asia. It is regarded as a major centre of Buddhism, as Gautama Buddha attained enlightenment at Bodh Gaya, which remains one of the holiest pilgrimage sites in Buddhism. The state is also associated with the ancient Buddhist universities of Nalanda and Vikramashila. Jainism has deep historical roots in Bihar. Mahavira, the 24th Tirthankara and a central figure in Jain tradition, attained moksha at Pawapuri in present-day Nalanda district. The region formed an important part of the early development of Jainism. The state is also an important centre of Sikhism. Takht Sri Patna Sahib in Patna, the birthplace of Guru Gobind Singh, the tenth Sikh Guru, is one of the five Takhts (seats of authority) in Sikhism and a major pilgrimage destination.

=== Languages ===
Languages of Bihar from 2011 census
1. Hindi (25.6%)
2. Bhojpuri (24.9%)
3. 'Other' Hindi (14.3%)
4. Maithili (12.6%)
5. Magahi (10.9%)
6. Urdu (8.45%)
7. Surjapuri (1.79%)
8. Others (1.42%)

Maithili language speakers in Bihar. It is one of the 22 Scheduled language of India

Hindi is the official language of the state and is spoken natively by 25.54% of the total population. At 8.42%, Urdu is the second official language in 15 districts of the state. However, the majority of the people speak one of the Bihari languages, most of which were classified as dialects of Hindi during the census. The major ones are Bhojpuri (24.86%), Maithili (12.55%) and Magahi (10.87%). Angika and Bajjika, two other notable Bihari languages, are not represented in the census. Maithili is a recognised regional language of India under the Eighth Schedule to the Constitution of India. Proponents have called for Bhojpuri, Magahi, Angika, and Bajjika to receive the same status. Smaller communities of Bengali and Surjapuri speakers are found in some parts of the state, especially in the eastern districts and urban areas.

== Government and administration ==
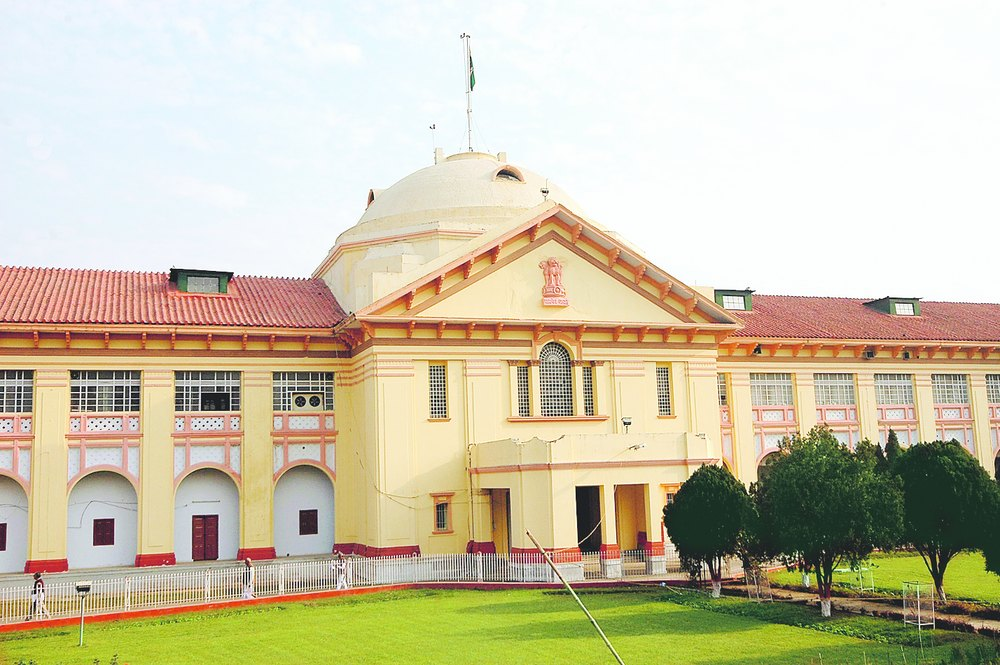
Patna High Court

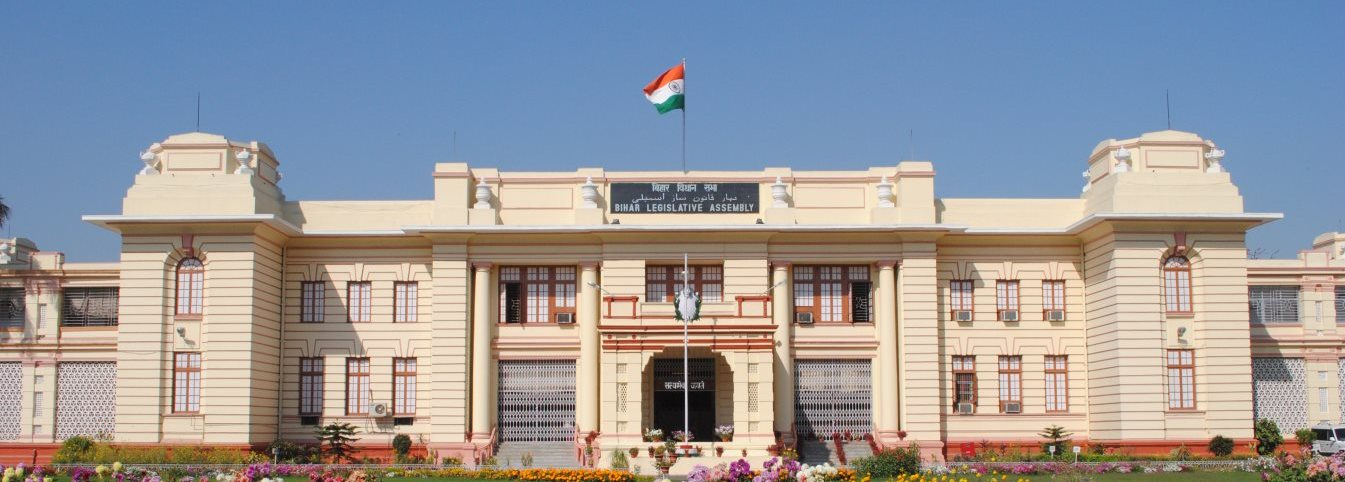
Bihar Vidhan Sabha

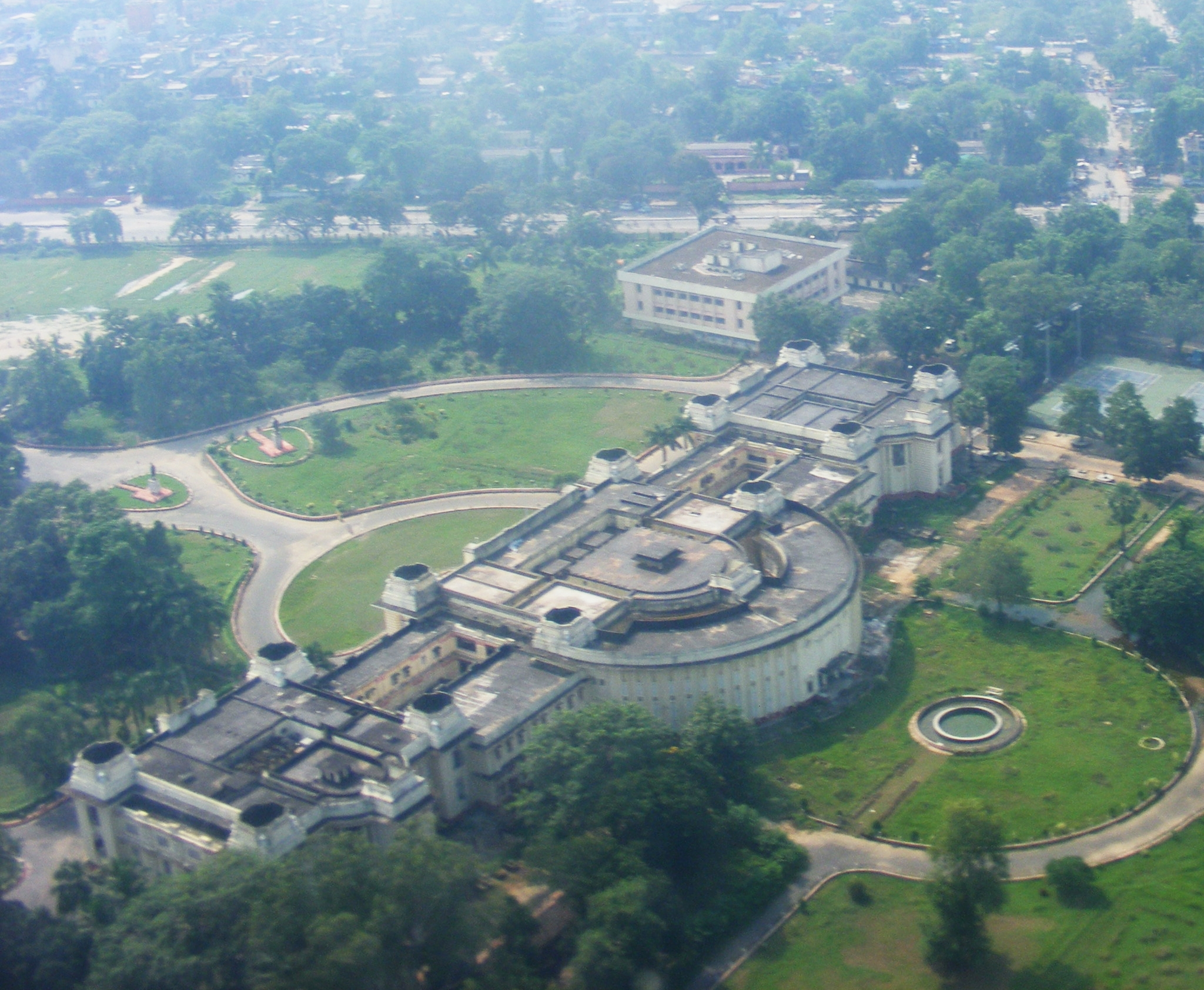
Patna Secretariat

Under the Constitution of India, the Governor is the head of the government of Bihar, and is appointed by the President of India. The Chief minister is the executive head of the government who, with its cabinet ministers, makes all important policy decisions. The political party or coalition of political parties having a majority in the Bihar Legislative Assembly forms the government.

The Chief Secretary is the head of the bureaucracy of the state, under whom a hierarchy of officials is drawn from the Indian Administrative Service, Indian Police Service, Indian Forest Service, and different wings of the state civil services. The judiciary is headed by the Chief Justice of the High Court. Bihar has a high court in Patna, which has been functioning since 1916. All the branches of the government are located in the state capital, Patna.

The state is administratively divided into nine divisions and 38 districts. Each division consists of several districts, overseen by a Divisional Commissioner, a senior IAS officer. Each district is headed by a District Magistrate–cum–Collector, an IAS officer appointed by the government. The district is further divided into subdivisions, which consist of tehsils for land revenue administration, headed by a Sub-Divisional Magistrate and Tehsildar, respectively. Districts are also divided into blocks, primarily for rural development administration.

The police administration in a district is headed by a Superintendent of Police (SP), an IPS officer appointed by the government.

For the governance of urban areas, Bihar has 19 municipal corporations, 89 nagar parishads (city councils), and 154 nagar panchayats (town councils).

For the governance of rural areas, Bihar has Panchayati Raj Institutions, comprising 8,053 gram panchayats (village councils), 533 panchayat samitis (block-level councils), and 38 zila parishads (district councils).

=== Politics ===
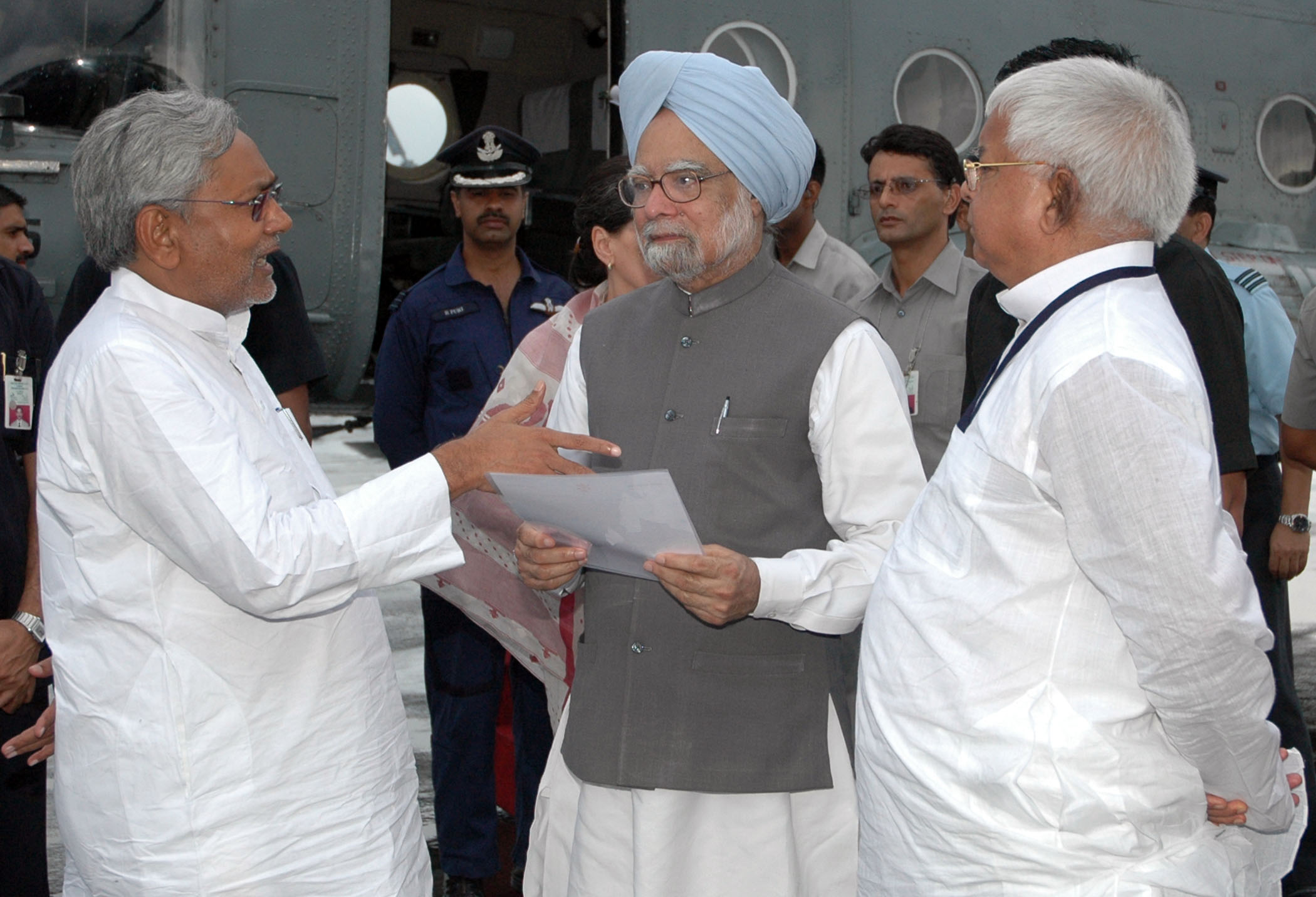
Nitish Kumar (left) with Lalu Prasad Yadav (right) discussing with former Prime Minister, Manmohan Singh (centre) about flood relief operation in Bihar.

The politics of Bihar have been based on caste since the onset of Indian independence. The important castes with political presence and influence in Bihar includes: Yadav, Koeri, Kurmi, Rajput, Bhumihar, and Brahmin. Before 1990, politics was dominated by Forward Castes– Brahmin, Rajput, Bhumihar, and Kayastha. The numerous Other Backward Class group was only given a token representation in the government. This over representation of upper castes was due to their dominance in the Indian National Congress, which dominated the politics of the state for three decades after the independence of India. According to political scientist Sanjay Kumar: "Using their dominant role in state's government, in the period before 1990, the Forward Castes deliberately subverted the 'land reforms', which could have helped Backward Castes and the Scheduled Castes". The upper backwards relied on the political parties of Lok Dal and later Janata Dal for increasing their political representation. The year of 1989–90 saw the implementation of Mandal Commission's recommendation by V. P. Singh's government, which reserved 27% per cent seats in government jobs and educational institutions for the members of Other Backward Class. This event mobilised them against the "politics of religion" of the Bhartiya Janata Party, which was backed by the Forward Castes. Important figures such as Lalu Prasad Yadav and Nitish Kumar took a leading role in this mobilisation, and by 1990, the upper backwards– Koeri, Kurmi, Yadav became the new political elites of the state.

Historically, a caste troika consisting the three communities, Kushwaha, Kurmi and Yadav also led an anti-upper caste agitation in the state of Bihar, pushing them to the prominence in the state's politics.

However, the tipping point of this Backward Caste unity came in 1995 Bihar Legislative Assembly election, when the dominant OBC castes, who were at the forefront in the collective struggle against the Forward Castes, were divided into two rival political camps. While one of these camps was led by Yadavs under Janata Dal, the other camp was led by Koeri and Kurmis, who assembled under the Samata Party. According to Sanjay Kumar, this was the election in which the caste divide in the state was most evident not between the Forward and Backward Castes, but rather between two groups of Backward Castes itself. It was this election from which the Forward Castes felt completely marginalised in Bihar's electoral politics and from then onwards, no longer held any significant role in the state's politics.

By 2004, The Economist magazine said that "Bihar [had] become a byword for the worst of India, of widespread and inescapable poverty, of corrupt politicians indistinguishable from mafia-dons they patronise, caste-ridden social order that has retained the worst feudal cruelties". In 2005, the World Bank believed that issues faced by the state were "enormous" because of "persistent poverty, complex social stratification, unsatisfactory infrastructure and weak governance". As of 2023, there are two main political formations: the National Democratic Alliance (NDA) which comprises Bharatiya Janata Party (BJP), Rashtriya Lok Janshakti Party (RLJP); and the United Progressive Alliance (UPA) between Rashtriya Janata Dal (RJD), Hindustani Awam Morcha, Rashtriya Lok Samta Party, Janata Dal (United) (JDU) and Indian National Congress (INC). There are many other political formations. The Communist Party of India had a strong presence in Bihar at one time, which has since weakened. The Communist Party of India (Marxist) CPI(M) and CPM and All India Forward Bloc (AIFB) have a minor presence, along with the other extreme leftist parties.

Nitish Kumar has been chief minister of Bihar for 13 years between 2005 and 2020. In contrast to prior governments, which emphasised divisions of caste and religion, his political platform was based on economic development, reduction of crime and corruption, and greater social equality. Since 2010, the government confiscated the properties of corrupt officials and redeveloped them into school buildings. They also introduced the Bihar Special Court Act to curb crime. It also legislated a two-hour lunch break on Fridays, to enable Muslim employees to pray and thereby reduce absenteeism. The government has prohibited the sale and consumption of alcohol in the state since March 2016, which has been linked to a drop in tourism and a rise in substance abuse.

On 14 April 2026, in a significant political shift Nitish Kumar resigned as the chief minister and was replaced by his deputy Samrat Chaudhary, who became the first chief minister of Bihar belonging to the BJP.

Chaudhary took several steps to strengthen the administration and maintain law and order in the state. He brought administrative changes like online registration of property for the elderly people for hassle free experience in the sale and purchase of land. This aimed to remove multiple lawsuits related to land pending in the courts of Bihar. Chaudhary also took stringent measures by giving free hand to police to act against the culprits. This, however, was criticised for promoting encounter culture in the state. He also launched scheme to elevate the infrastructure of government schools to the level of private schools and proposed to regulate the exorbitant fees charged by private schools for making education accessible to all.

In a step to give boost to industrial development and create jobs in manufacturing sector within the state, Chaudhary inaugurated a bottling and cement plant in the Buxar district worth 1700 crore rupees. For combatting unplanned urban development, he launched the ambitious project of developing twelve urban townships. This included Tirhut township in Muzaffarpur district. A number of projects were launched by him in 2026 under Chief Minister Comprehensive Urban Development Program which included allocation of ₹1047 crore for 982 projects in Muzaffarpur. In july 2026, Chaudhary announced opening of 211 degree colleges in the state in a drive to reform higher education sector.

== Divisions, districts and cities ==
Details of Divisions
| Map | Division | Headquarter | Area | Population^{*}2011 | #District | Districts |
|---|---|---|---|---|---|---|
| | Patna | Patna | 16,960 km^{2} (6,550 sq mi) | 17,734,739 | 6 | Patna |
| | Patna | Patna | 16,960 km^{2} (6,550 sq mi) | 17,734,739 | 6 | Nalanda |
| | Patna | Patna | 16,960 km^{2} (6,550 sq mi) | 17,734,739 | 6 | Bhojpur |
| | Patna | Patna | 16,960 km^{2} (6,550 sq mi) | 17,734,739 | 6 | Rohtas |
| | Patna | Patna | 16,960 km^{2} (6,550 sq mi) | 17,734,739 | 6 | Buxar |
| | Patna | Patna | 16,960 km^{2} (6,550 sq mi) | 17,734,739 | 6 | Kaimur |
| | Magadh | Gaya | 12,345 km^{2} (4,766 sq mi) | 10,931,018 | 5 | Gaya |
| | Magadh | Gaya | 12,345 km^{2} (4,766 sq mi) | 10,931,018 | 5 | Nawada |
| | Magadh | Gaya | 12,345 km^{2} (4,766 sq mi) | 10,931,018 | 5 | Aurangabad |
| | Magadh | Gaya | 12,345 km^{2} (4,766 sq mi) | 10,931,018 | 5 | Jehanabad |
| | Magadh | Gaya | 12,345 km^{2} (4,766 sq mi) | 10,931,018 | 5 | Arwal |
| | Tirhut | Muzaffarpur | 17,147 km^{2} (6,620 sq mi) | 21,356,045 | 6 | West Champaran |
| | Tirhut | Muzaffarpur | 17,147 km^{2} (6,620 sq mi) | 21,356,045 | 6 | East Champaran |
| | Tirhut | Muzaffarpur | 17,147 km^{2} (6,620 sq mi) | 21,356,045 | 6 | Muzaffarpur |
| | Tirhut | Muzaffarpur | 17,147 km^{2} (6,620 sq mi) | 21,356,045 | 6 | Sitamarhi. |
| | Tirhut | Muzaffarpur | 17,147 km^{2} (6,620 sq mi) | 21,356,045 | 6 | Sheohar |
| | Tirhut | Muzaffarpur | 17,147 km^{2} (6,620 sq mi) | 21,356,045 | 6 | Vaishali |
| | Saran | Chhapra | 6,893 km^{2} (2,661 sq mi) | 10,819,311 | 3 | Saran |
| | Saran | Chhapra | 6,893 km^{2} (2,661 sq mi) | 10,819,311 | 3 | Siwan |
| | Saran | Chhapra | 6,893 km^{2} (2,661 sq mi) | 10,819,311 | 3 | Gopalganj |
| | Darbhanga | Darbhanga | 8,684 km^{2} (3,353 sq mi) | 15,652,799 | 3 | Darbhanga |
| | Darbhanga | Darbhanga | 8,684 km^{2} (3,353 sq mi) | 15,652,799 | 3 | Madhubani |
| | Darbhanga | Darbhanga | 8,684 km^{2} (3,353 sq mi) | 15,652,799 | 3 | Samastipur |
| | Kosi | Saharsa | 5,899 km^{2} (2,277 sq mi) | 6,120,117 | 3 | Saharsa |
| | Kosi | Saharsa | 5,899 km^{2} (2,277 sq mi) | 6,120,117 | 3 | Madhepura |
| | Kosi | Saharsa | 5,899 km^{2} (2,277 sq mi) | 6,120,117 | 3 | Supaul |
| | Purnea | Purnea | 10,009 km^{2} (3,864 sq mi) | 10,838,525 | 4 | Purnia |
| | Purnea | Purnea | 10,009 km^{2} (3,864 sq mi) | 10,838,525 | 4 | Katihar |
| | Purnea | Purnea | 10,009 km^{2} (3,864 sq mi) | 10,838,525 | 4 | Araria |
| | Purnea | Purnea | 10,009 km^{2} (3,864 sq mi) | 10,838,525 | 4 | Kishanganj |
| | Bhagalpur | Bhagalpur | 5,589 km^{2} (2,158 sq mi) | 5,061,565 | 2 | Bhagalpur |
| | Bhagalpur | Bhagalpur | 5,589 km^{2} (2,158 sq mi) | 5,061,565 | 2 | Banka |
| | Munger | Munger | 9,862 km^{2} (3,807 sq mi) | 6,120,117 | 6 | Munger |
| | Munger | Munger | 9,862 km^{2} (3,807 sq mi) | 6,120,117 | 6 | Jamui |
| | Munger | Munger | 9,862 km^{2} (3,807 sq mi) | 6,120,117 | 6 | Khagaria |
| | Munger | Munger | 9,862 km^{2} (3,807 sq mi) | 6,120,117 | 6 | Lakhisarai |
| | Munger | Munger | 9,862 km^{2} (3,807 sq mi) | 6,120,117 | 6 | Begusarai |
| | Munger | Munger | 9,862 km^{2} (3,807 sq mi) | 6,120,117 | 6 | Sheikhpura |

Note

* Population data obtained from the sum of the populations of the districts.

List of largest populated cities in Bihar governed by a municipal corporation
| Rank | City | Population (2011) | Photograph | Rank | City | Population (2011) | Photograph |
|---|---|---|---|---|---|---|---|
| 1 | Patna | 1,684,222 | | 11 | Begusarai | 252,008 | |
| 2 | Gaya | 474,093 | | 12 | Katihar | 240,838 | |
| 3 | Bhagalpur | 400,146 | | 13 | Bettiah | 237,254 | |
| 4 | Muzaffarpur | 354,462 | | 14 | Motihari | 221,646 | |
| 5 | Purnia | 310,738 | | 15 | Saharsa | 216,491 | |
| 6 | Bihar Sharif | 297,268 | | 16 | Munger | 213,303 | |
| 7 | Darbhanga | 296,039 | | 17 | Chhapra | 202,352 | |
| 8 | Sasaram | 264,709 | | 18 | Sitamarhi | 167,818 | |
| 9 | Arrah | 261,430 | | 19 | Madhubani | 164,156 | |
| 10 | Samastipur | 253,136 | | | | | |

== Crime and sexual violence ==
Bihar has historically faced challenges related to violent crime, including murder, kidnapping, extortion, and crimes against women. According to data from the National Crime Records Bureau (NCRB), the state has reported substantial numbers of violent offences over the years, although trends have varied across different crime categories. Reports indicate that murders in Bihar declined from the high levels recorded in the early 2000s, while overall crime registration and certain categories of violent crime remained significant. Kidnapping has been a persistent concern in the state, including cases involving ransom and kidnapping for marriage. Land and property disputes, personal enmity, family conflicts and financial disputes have been identified among the major motives for violent crimes recorded in Bihar. Juvenile involvement in crime has emerged as a growing concern according to recent NCRB reporting. The National Human Rights Commission (NHRC) frequently issues notices and takes suo motu cognizance of human rights violations in Bihar.

Crimes against women, including rape, domestic violence and dowry-related offences, have remained an area of concern. NCRB data have shown continued reporting of rape cases and other offences against women across the state. Recent reports have also noted an increase in recorded violent crimes and offences involving juveniles, prompting discussions on law enforcement, social conditions and public safety. Recent high-profile cases, such as the Begusarai gang-rape incident, Vaishali Case, and a September 2026 assault in Jamui have highlighted ongoing concerns regarding sexual violence and safety for women in Bihar. According to the National Family Health Survey (NFHS), 45 per cent of married women aged 15 to 49 in Bihar have experienced physical, emotional, or sexual violence. This is higher than the national average of 33 per cent. Only about 13 per cent of women who experience physical or sexual violence in the state seek help. Experts attribute this low number to social stigma, fear, and a culture of silence.

== Public health ==
Bihar generally ranks among the weakest in health outcomes in comparison to other Indian states because it lacks adequate health care facilities. While the National Health Mission, the Clinical Establishments Act of 2010, and the formation of the Empowered Action Group (EAG) provide federal funds to expand and improve healthcare services, Bihar's ability to fully utilise this funding is lacking.

Research indicates that Bihar relies on privatised hospitals to provide healthcare to the masses, with the second-highest ratio among Indian states for private to public spending and high levels of corruption. These factors are associated with slower healthcare delivery and steep healthcare costs. Corruption is enabled as Bihar lacks continuity and transparency of health reporting as required by the Clinical Establishments Act of 2010. In turn, this prevents the government from making evidence-based conclusions about policy changes and hospital effectiveness, resulting in patterns of ill-informed spending and inconsistent hiring.

When comparing Bihar to Kerala, the number of healthcare professionals (including registered nurses, auxiliary nurses, physicians and health supervisors) at each hospital are significantly lower, and remain constant over time while they steadily increase in number in Kerala. According to Ministry of Health statistics, the greatest shortfalls are for physicians and specialists at 75%. Bihar has only 50% of the sub-health centres, 60% of the primary health centres, and 9% of the community health centres required by the national supply-to-population standards. The number of public hospital beds in Bihar decreased between 2008 and 2015. Given the high population density of the state, Bihar is significantly behind in the number of healthcare professionals that should be employed. Despite these shortcomings, Bihar has shown gradual signs of improvement for female health workers, the overall death rate, and infant, neo-natal, child and maternal mortality rates.

== Economy ==
Gross State Domestic Product
| Year | Millions of rupees |
| 1980 | ₹73,530 |
| 1985 | ₹142,950 |
| 1990 | ₹264,290 |
| 1995 | ₹244,830 |
| 2000 | ₹469,430 |
| 2005 | ₹710,060 |
| 2010 | ₹2,042,890 |
| 2015 | ₹3,694,690 |
| 2020 | ₹6,857,970 |
| 2025 | ₹1,0972,640 |

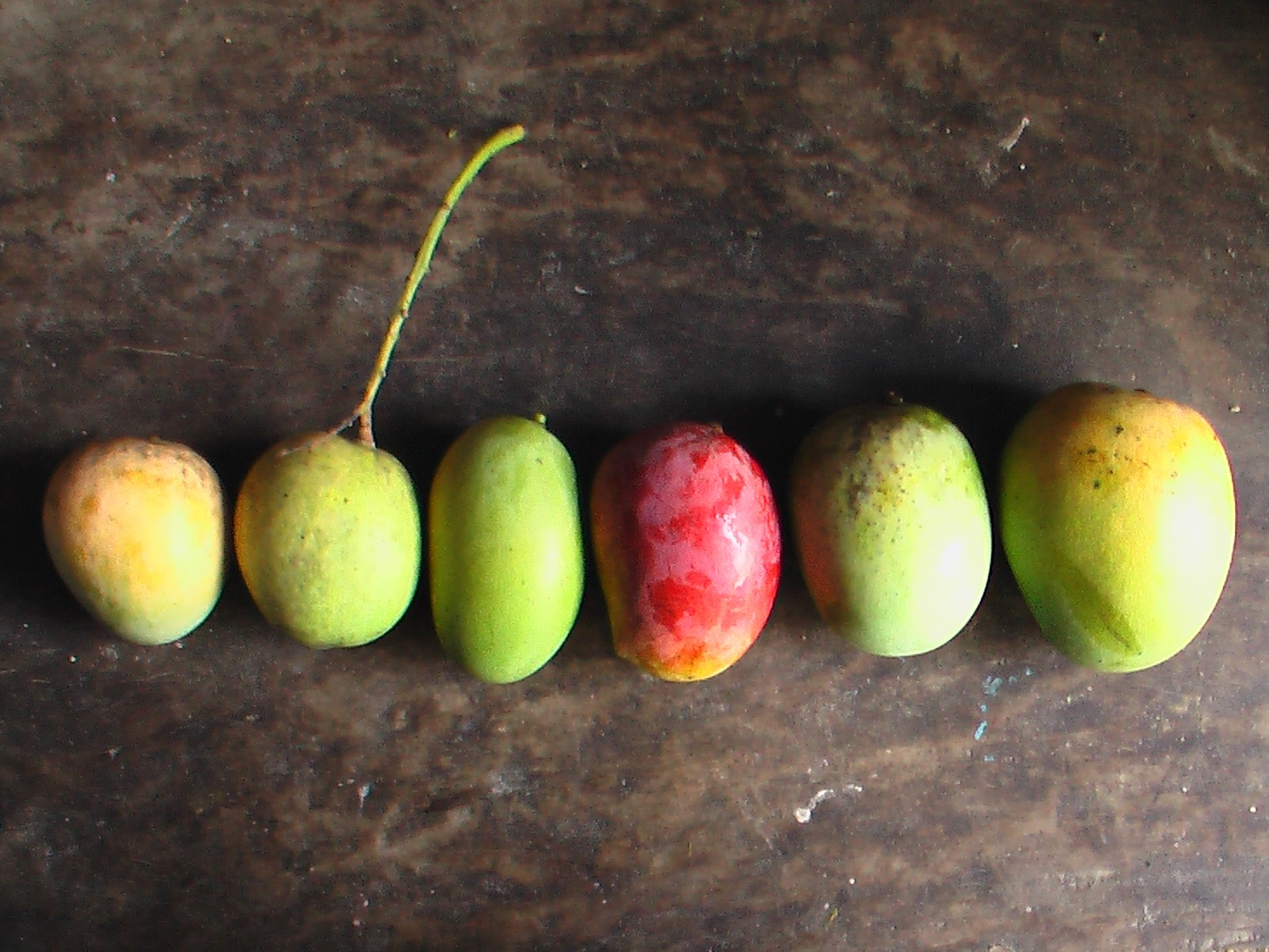
Langra mango from a farm in Shivnarayanpur, Bhagalpur, Bihar

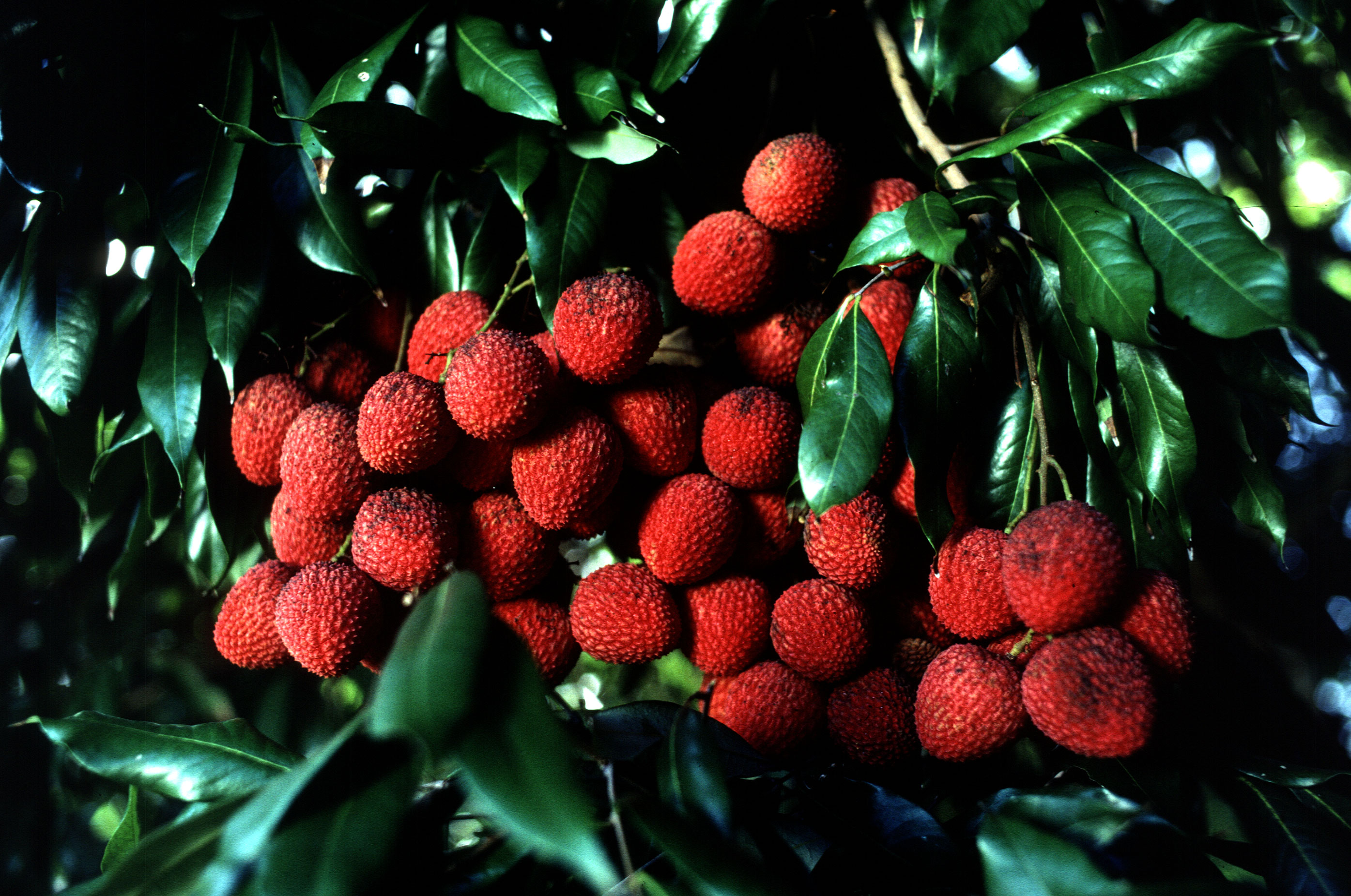
Bihar accounts for 71% of India's annual litchi production.

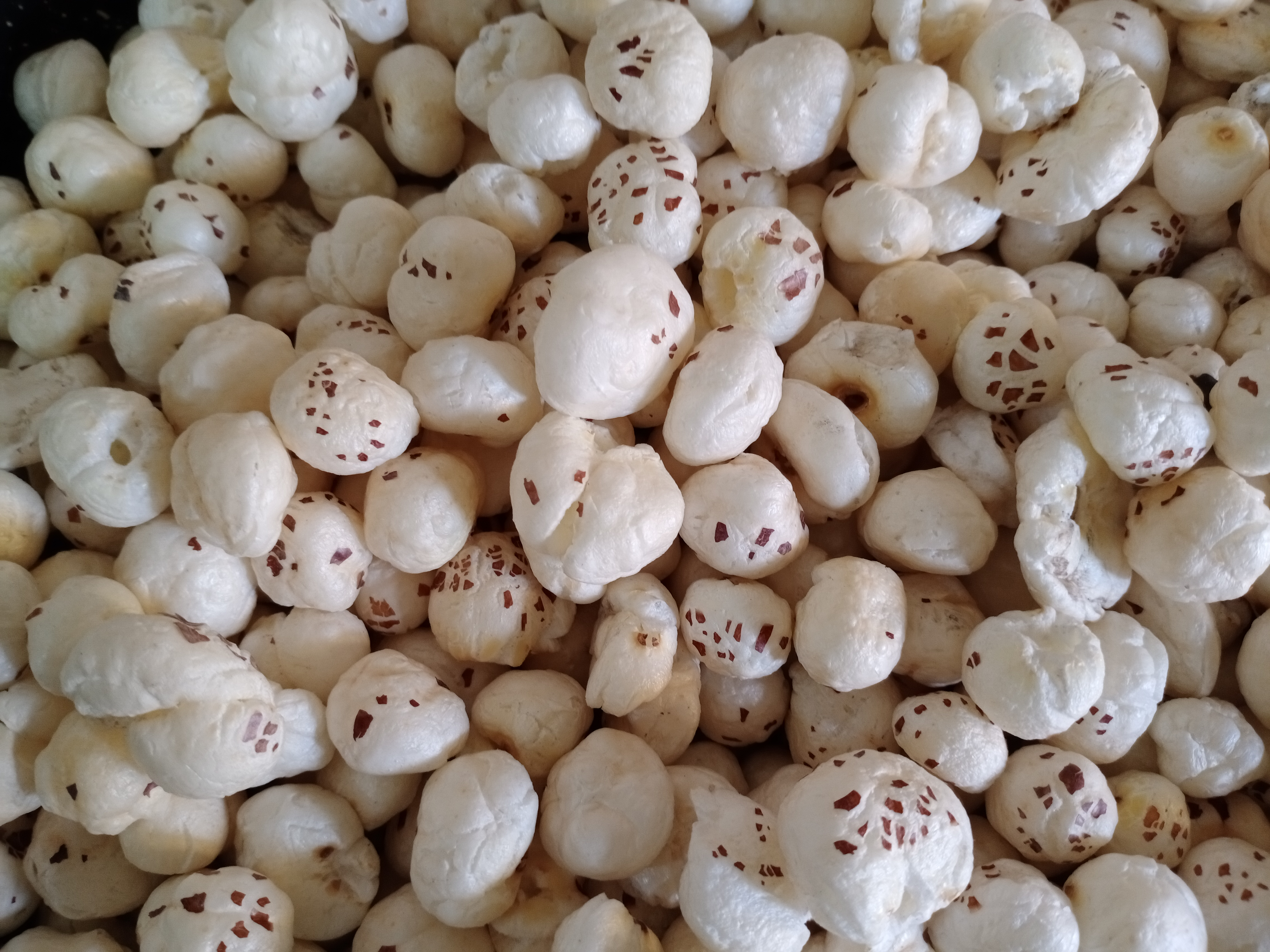
Bihar produces 90% of the world's makhana (Euryale ferox) seeds, also known as fox nuts. It is the largest producer of these seeds in the world.

Bihar's gross state domestic product (GSDP) for the fiscal year (FY) 2024- was around ₹9,765.67 billion. By sectors, its composition is 19.9% agriculture, 21.5% industry and 58.6% services. Bihar has one of the fastest-growing state economy in terms of GSDP, with a growth rate of 13.5% in FY 2024-25. The economy of Bihar was projected to grow at a compound annual growth rate (CAGR) of 13.4% during 2012–2017 (the 12th Five-Year Plan). Bihar has experienced strong growth in per capita net state domestic product (NSDP). At current prices, per capita NSDP of the state grew at a CAGR of 12.91% from 2004 to 2005 to 2014–15. Bihar's per capita income went up by 40.6% in FY 2014–15. The state's debt was estimated at 77% of GDP by 2007.

=== Agriculture ===
Among the states of India, Bihar is the fourth-largest producer of vegetables and the eighth-largest producer of fruits. About 80% of the state's population is employed in agriculture, which is above the national average. The main agricultural products are litchi, guava, mango, pineapple, brinjal, lady's finger, cauliflower, cabbage, rice, wheat, sugarcane, and sunflower. Though good soil and favourable climatic conditions favour agriculture, this can be hampered by floods and soil erosion. The southern parts of the state endure annual droughts, which affect crops such as paddy.

=== Industry ===
Industrial development of the state is supported by the Bihar Industrial Area Development Authority.

Begusarai hosts enterprises like Barauni Refinery, NTPC, Barauni (BTPS), Barauni Fertiliser Plant (HURL Barauni), Sudha Dairy Plant, Pepsi Bottling Plant.

Hajipur, Muzaffarpur Dalmianagar, Munger, Jamalpur and Barauni are the major industrial cities in Bihar The capital city, Patna, is one of the better-off cities in India when measured by per capita income. Hajipur is also known for presence of private industries like Competence Exports, which gained international recognition in 2024, when it was reported to be catering to the demand of many European countries. In 2024, Hajipur was reported to become the exporter of designer shoes for European companies. It also exported shoes for Russian Army amidst their Ukrainian campaign.

The Finance Ministry has sought to create investment opportunities for big industrial houses like Reliance Industries. Further developments have taken place in the growth of small industries, improvements in IT infrastructure, a software park in Patna, Darbhanga, Bhagalpur, and the completion of the expressway from the Purvanchal border through Bihar to Jharkhand. In August 2008, a Patna-registered company called the Security and Intelligence Services took over the Australian guard and mobile patrol services business of American conglomerate, United Technologies Corporation (UTC). SIS is registered and taxed in Bihar.

Prior to prohibition, Bihar emerged as a brewery hub with numerous production units. In August 2018, United Breweries Limited announced it would begin production of non-alcoholic beer at its previously defunct brewery in Bihar.

=== Startup ===
The Bihar Startup Policy 2022-2027 aims to make Bihar a preferred destination for startups and entrepreneurs by leveraging local youth for inclusive growth.

The policy offers various incentives, including interest-free seed funding up to ₹10 lakh, tax exemptions, and access to incubation centers. The government has established a Startup Bihar Fund Trust (SBFT) with an initial corpus of ₹500 crore to provide venture capital for startups. Key sectors witnessing significant growth include agritech, healthcare, edtech, and e-commerce. With a focus on skill development, mentorship, and ease of doing business, Bihar is steadily transforming into an emerging hub for startups, driving both economic growth and employment.

=== Income distribution ===
In terms of income, the districts of Patna, Begusarai, Bhagalpur, Munger, and placed highest among the 38 districts in the state, recording the highest per capita gross district domestic product of ₹2,15,049, ₹84,279, ₹80,471, ₹79,272 respectively, in FY 2022-23.

Per Capita of major districts of Bihar (FY 2022-23)
| District | GDDP Per Capita |
|---|---|
| Patna | ₹2,15,049 |
| Begusarai | ₹84,279 |
| Bhagalpur | ₹80,471 |
| Munger | ₹79,272 |

Bihar also ranks very low in per capital income in comparison to other cities in India. Patna has per capital income of 1.85L, which is much lower than other cities like Gurugram (₹7.41L), Noida (₹6.13), Bengaluru (₹6.21L), Hyderabad (₹6.58L) and Mumbai (₹6.43).

=== Income disparity among social groups ===
Rumela Sen, a lecturer at Columbia University, outlines the inequalities and backwardness prevalent in Bihar in the post-independence period as a consequence of the "delaying tactics" against the implementation of land reform and utilisation of kinship ties by the upper-caste landlords, who had an obstructionist attitude towards land reform policies. The upper-caste not only dominated the administration, but also the politics in the post-independence period; they utilised their caste ties in order to prevent the distribution of about 9000 acres of land intended for the poor. Since the landlords primarily belonged to upper-castes, just like the politicians and administrators in the early decades after independence, they were successful in grabbing large holdings of land amidst the passage of the Zamindari abolition act of 1952.

== Culture ==
=== Paintings ===
Painting in Bihar
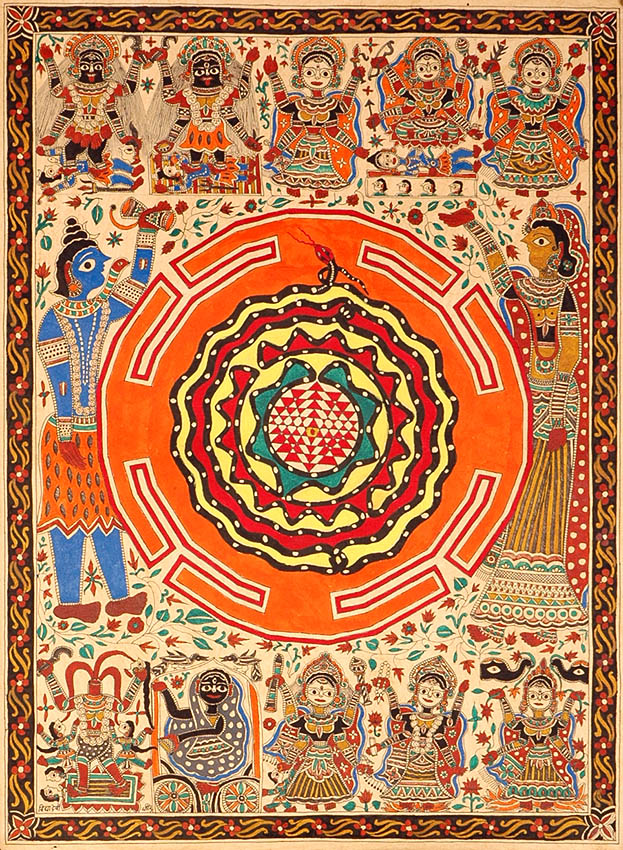
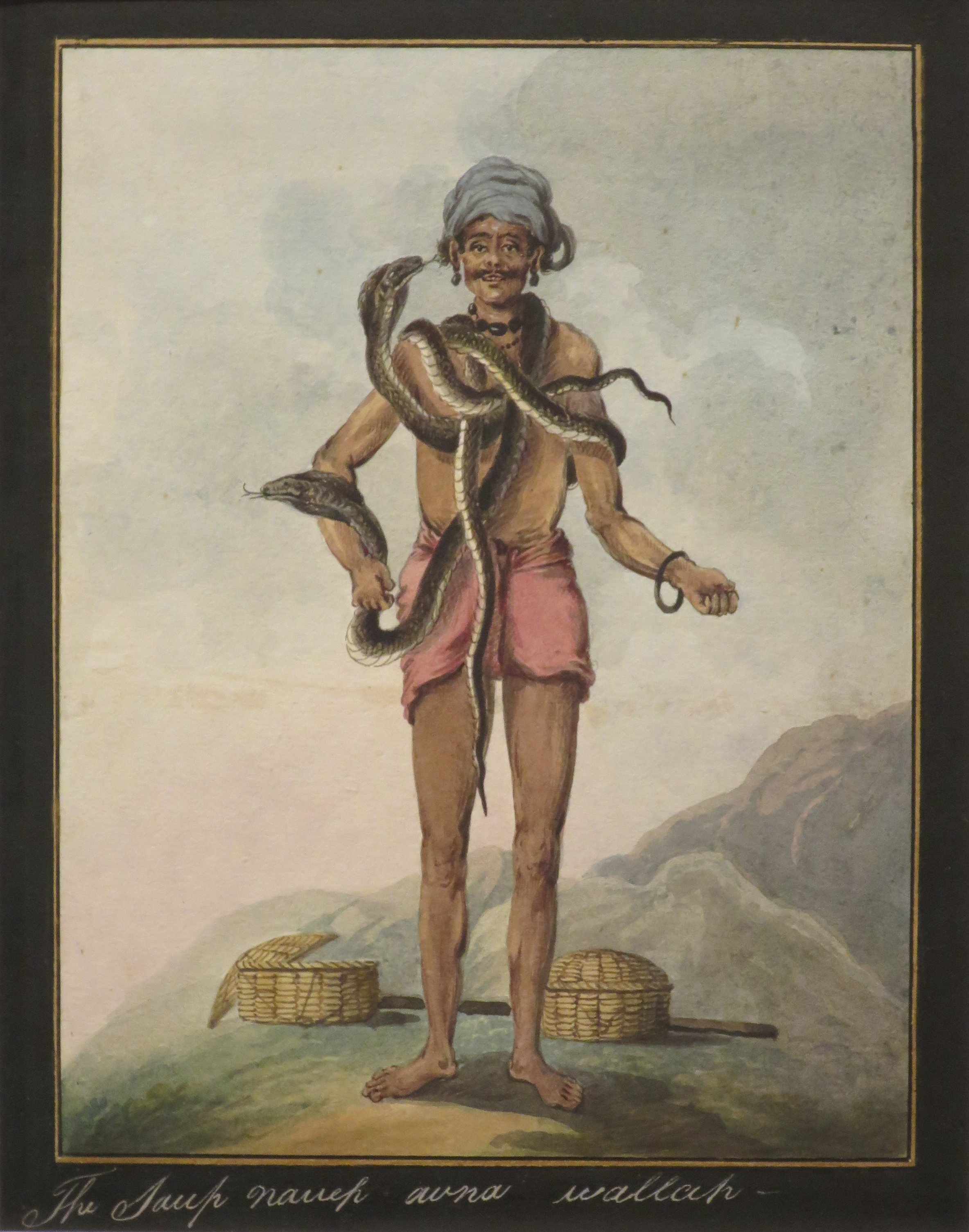
Left : Madhubani Painting, Right : Patna Qualam
Tikuli Painting and Manjusha Painting are two other form of Painting in Bihar

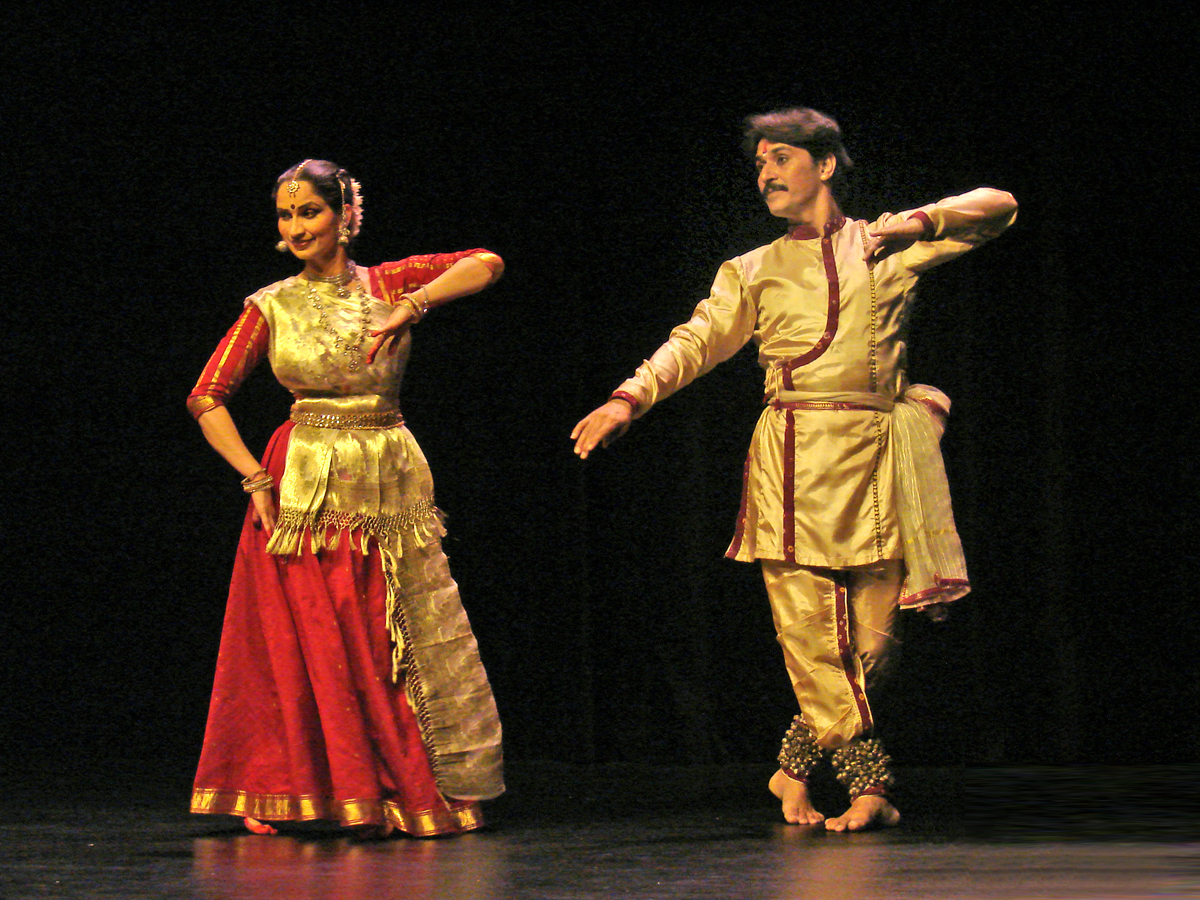
Kathak classical dance form, from Bhojpur region

There are several traditional styles of painting practised in Bihar. One is Mithila painting, a style used in the Mithila region of Bihar. Traditionally, this form was practised mainly by women, passed down generation to generation. Painting was usually done on walls during festivals, religious events, births, marriages, and other cultural milestones. It was traditionally done on the plastered walls of mud huts, and is also done on cloth, handmade paper and canvas. Famous Mithila painters include Smt Bharti Dayal, Mahasundari Devi, the late Ganga Devi, and Sita Devi.

Mithila painting is also called Madhubani art. It mostly depicts human beings and their association with nature. Common scenes illustrate deities and Saraswati from ancient epics, celestial objects, and religious plants like Tulsi, and scenes from the royal court and social events. Generally, no space is left empty.

Bhojpuri painting is a folk painting style that has flourished in the Bhojpuri region of Bihar thousands of years ago. This painting style is a type of wall painting primarily done on temple walls or on walls of the rooms of newly married couples and the main motifs are that of Lord Shiva and Goddess Parvati. Motifs of natural objects and life and struggles of village people are also depicted. It is also traditionally painted during festivals. Traditional Bhojpuri painting encompasses various folk-art forms, including Kohbar, Pidiya, Godna, Godhan, and Pachmi. Bhojpuri Pidiya Painting has also received a Geographical Indication (GI) tag in India.

The Patna School of Painting (Patna Kalam), sometimes called "Company Painting", flourished in Bihar during the early 18th to mid-20th centuries. It was an offshoot of the Mughal Miniature School of Painting. Those who practised this art form were descendants of Hindu artisans of Mughal painting. Facing persecution from the Mughal Emperor, Aurangzeb, these artisans found refuge, via Murshidabad, in Patna during the late 18th century. Their art shared the characteristics of the Mughal painters, expanded subject matter from court scenes to bazaar scenes, daily life and ceremonies. They used watercolours on paper and on mica. This school of painting formed the basis for the formation of the Patna Art School under the leadership of Shri Radha Mohan. The school is an important centre of the fine arts in Bihar.

=== Performing arts ===
Bihar has produced musicians like Bharat Ratna and Ustad Bismillah Khan, and dhrupad singers like the Malliks (Darbhanga Gharana) and the Mishras (Bettiah Gharana), along with poets like Vidyapati Thakur who contributed to the genre of Maithili music. The classical music in Bihar is a form of Hindustani classical music.

Gaya is another centre of classical music, particularly of the Tappa and Thumri varieties. Pandit Govardhan Mishra–son of the Ram Prasad Mishra, himself an accomplished singer– is perhaps the finest living exponent of Tappa singing in India, according to Padma Shri Gajendra Narayan Singh, founding secretary of the Sangeet Natak Academi of Bihar.

Gajendra Narayan Singh also writes, in his memoir, that Champanagar, Banaili, was another major centre of classical music. Rajkumar Shyamanand Sinha of Champanagar, Banaili princely state, was a great patron of music and was himself a renowned figure in the world of classical vocal music in Bihar in his time. Singh, on the subject of Indian classical music in a separate book of his, wrote that "Kumar Shyamanand Singh of Banaili estate had such expertise in singing that many great singers including Kesarbai Kerkar acknowledged his ability. After listening to bandishes from Kumar Sahib, Pandit Jasraj was moved to tears and lamented that, alas, he did not have such ability himself."

During the 19th century, many Biharis emigrated as indentured labourers to the West Indies, Fiji, and Mauritius. During this time many sorrowful plays and songs called birha became popular in the Bhojpur region, as Bhojpuri Birha. Dramas incorporating this theme continue to be popular in the theatres of Patna.

=== Cinema ===
Bihar has a robust Bhojpuri-language film industry. There is also a smaller production of Magadhi-, Maithili-language films. The first film with Bhojpuri dialogue was Ganga Jamuna, released in 1961. Bhaiyaa, the first Magadhi film, was released in 1961. The first Maithili movie was Kanyadan released in 1965. Maithili film Mithila Makhaan won the National Film Award for Best Maithili Film in 2016. The history of films entirely in Bhojpuri begins in 1962 with the well-received film Ganga Maiyya Tohe Piyari Chadhaibo ("Mother Ganges, I will offer you a yellow sari"), which was directed by Kundan Kumar. 1963's Lagi nahin chute ram was the all-time hit Bhojpuri film, and had higher attendance than Mughal-e-Azam in the eastern and northern regions of India. Bollywood's Nadiya Ke Paar is another well-known Bhojpuri-language movie. Films such as Bidesiya ("Foreigner", 1963, directed by S. N. Tripathi) and Ganga ("Ganges", 1965, directed by Kundan Kumar) were profitable and popular, but in general Bhojpuri films were not commonly produced in the 1960s and 1970s.

In the 1980s, enough Bhojpuri films were produced to support a dedicated industry. Films such as Mai ("Mom", 1989, directed by Rajkumar Sharma) and Hamar Bhauji ("My Brother's Wife", 1983, directed by Kalpataru) had success at the box office. However, this trend faded during the 1990s.

In 2001, Bhojpuri films regained popularity with Saiyyan Hamar ("My Sweetheart", directed by Mohan Prasad), which raised actor Ravi Kishan to prominence. Several other commercially successful films followed, including Panditji Batai Na Biyah Kab Hoi ("Priest, tell me when I will marry", 2005, directed by Mohan Prasad) and Sasura Bada Paisa Wala ("My father-in-law, the rich guy", 2005). These films did much better business in Uttar Pradesh and Bihar than mainstream Bollywood hits at the time, and were both made on extremely tight budgets. Sasura Bada Paisa Wala also introduced Manoj Tiwari, formerly a well-loved folk singer, to the wider audiences of Bhojpuri cinema. The success of Ravi Kishan and Manoj Tiwari's films led to a revival in Bhojpuri cinema, and the industry began to support an awards show and trade magazine Bhojpuri City. The industry produces over one hundred films per year.

In 2019, the Maithili film Mithila Makhaan won Best Maithili Film in the 63rd National Film Awards.

=== Mass media ===
Biharbandhu was the first Hindi newspaper published in Bihar. It was started in 1872 by Madan Mohan Bhatta, a Marathi Brahman who settled in Bihar Sharif. Hindi journalism often failed until it became an official language in the state. Hindi was introduced in the law courts in Bihar in 1880.

Urdu journalism and poetry have a long history in Bihar, with many poets such as Shaad Azimabadi, Kaif Azimabadi, Kalim Ajiz and Bismil Azimabadi. Bihar publishes many Urdu dailies, such as Qomi Tanzim and Sahara, and the monthly Voice of Bihar.

The beginning of the 20th century was marked by a number of notable new publications. A monthly magazine named Bharat Ratna was started in Patna, in 1901. It was followed by Ksahtriya Hitaishi, Aryavarta from Dinapure, Udyoga, and Chaitanya Chandrika. Udyog was edited by Vijyaanand Tripathy, a famous poet of the time, and Chaitanya Chandrika by Krishna Chaitanya Goswami, a literary figure of that time. The literary activity was not confined to Patna alone but to other districts of Bihar.

=== Festivals ===
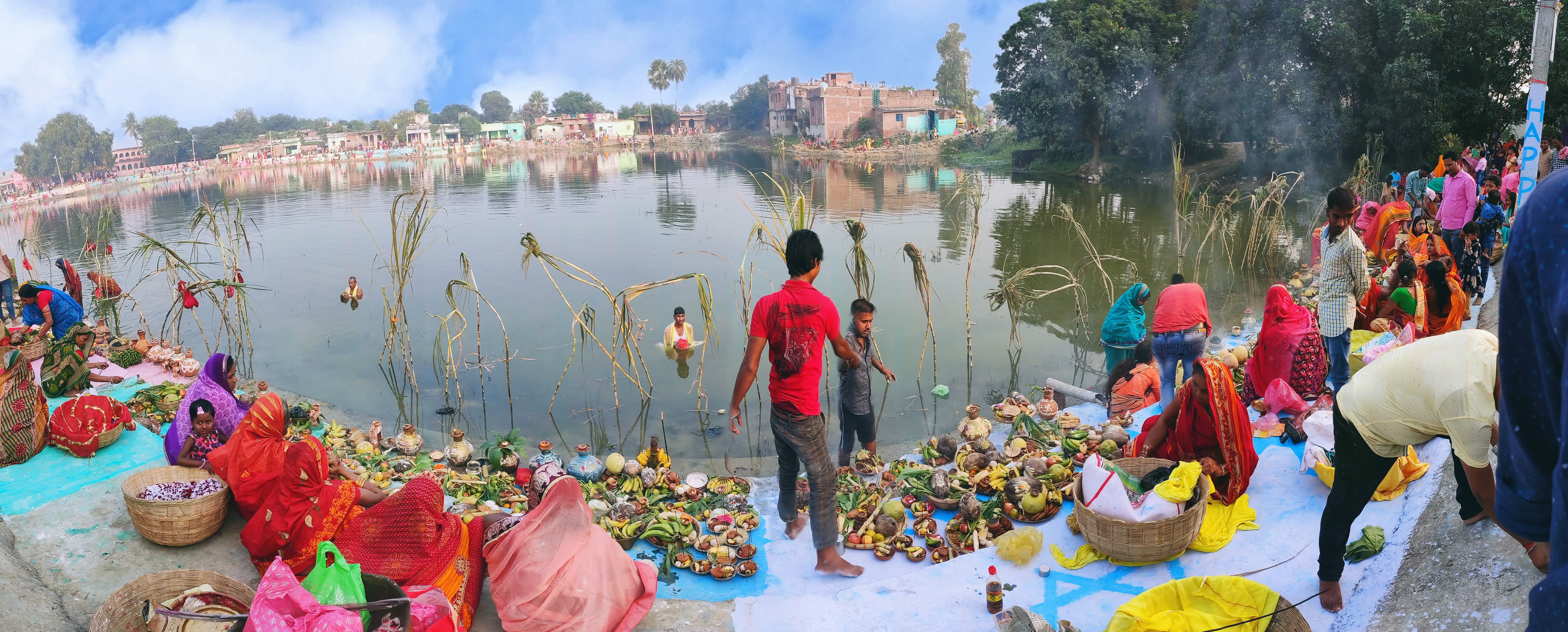
Chath Puja

Chhath Puja is the biggest and most popular festival in Bihar. The four-day-long holy Hindu festival includes intense celebration across the state. Chhath Puja are done in various cities, towns, and villages throughout Bihar. All of Bihar involves itself in devotion to Chhath Puja. The city is decked up in lighting decorations and thousands of colourful ghats are set up, where effigies of the goddess Chhath Maiya and her brother God Surya are displayed and worshipped at both sunset and sunrise. People of all religious backgrounds go to the bank of any river or near by a pond or lake in order to give arghya to the Sun. They carry fruits and thekuaa along with them in soop and daura (a bowl-like structure made of bamboo) for their worship activities. Nowadays, these traditions have spread to multiple countries worldwide wherever Bihari community is present.

Durga Puja is also the biggest, most popular and widely celebrated festival in Bihar. The ten-day-long colourful Hindu festival includes intense celebration across the state. Pandals are erected in various cities, towns, and villages throughout Bihar. The cities of Bihar are transformed during Durga Puja. Urban areas are decked up in lighting decorations and thousands of colourful pandals are set up where effigies of the goddess Durga and her four children are displayed and worshipped. The idols of the goddess are brought in from Kumortuli, where idol-makers work throughout the year fashioning clay models of the goddess. Since independence in 1947, Durga Puja has slowly changed into more of a glamorous carnival than that of a religious festival. Today people of diverse religious and ethnic backgrounds partake in the festivities. On Vijayadashami, the last day of the festival, the effigies are paraded through the streets with riotous pageantry before being immersed into the rivers.

== Tourism ==
Tourist attractions in Bihar
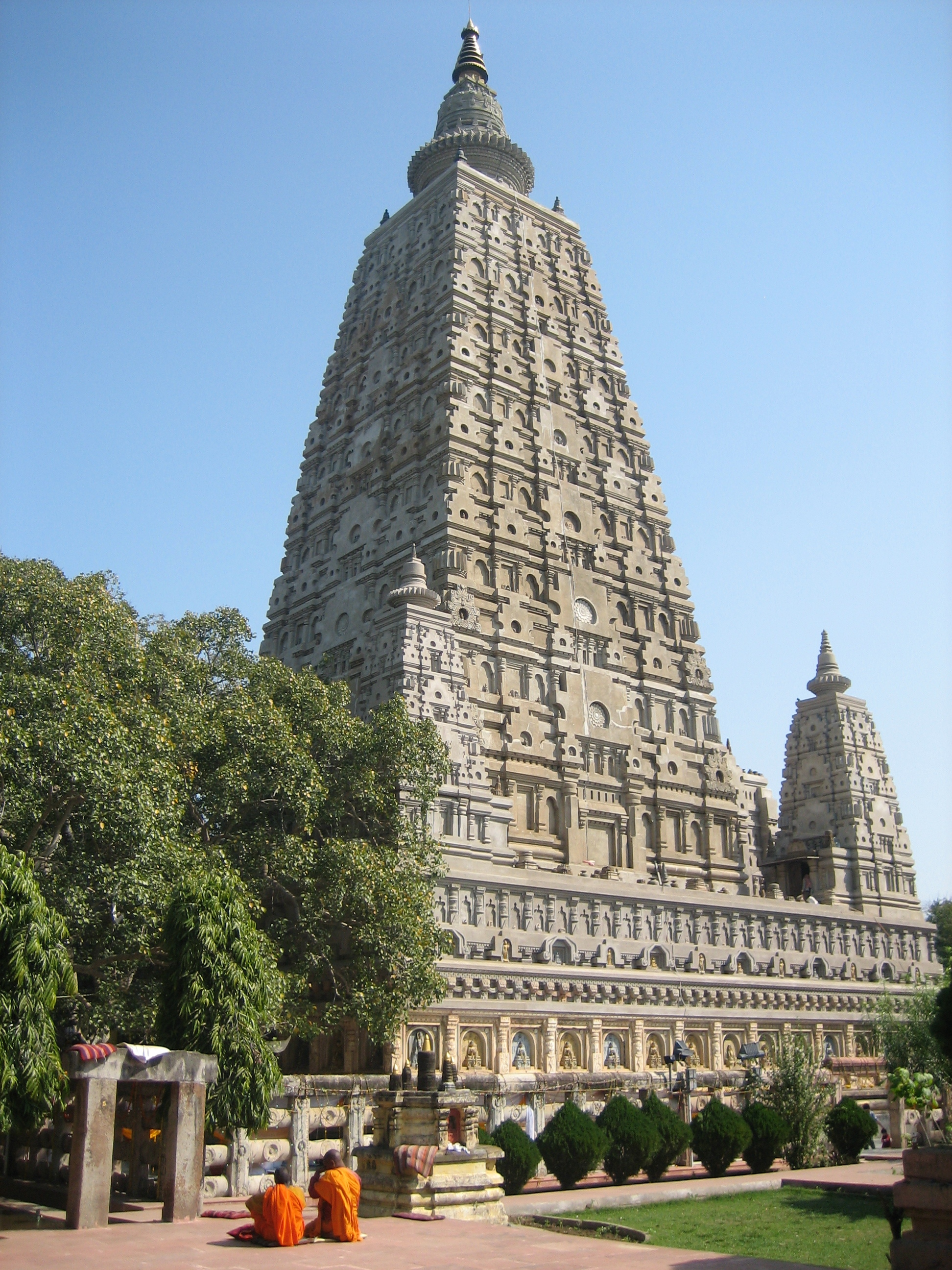
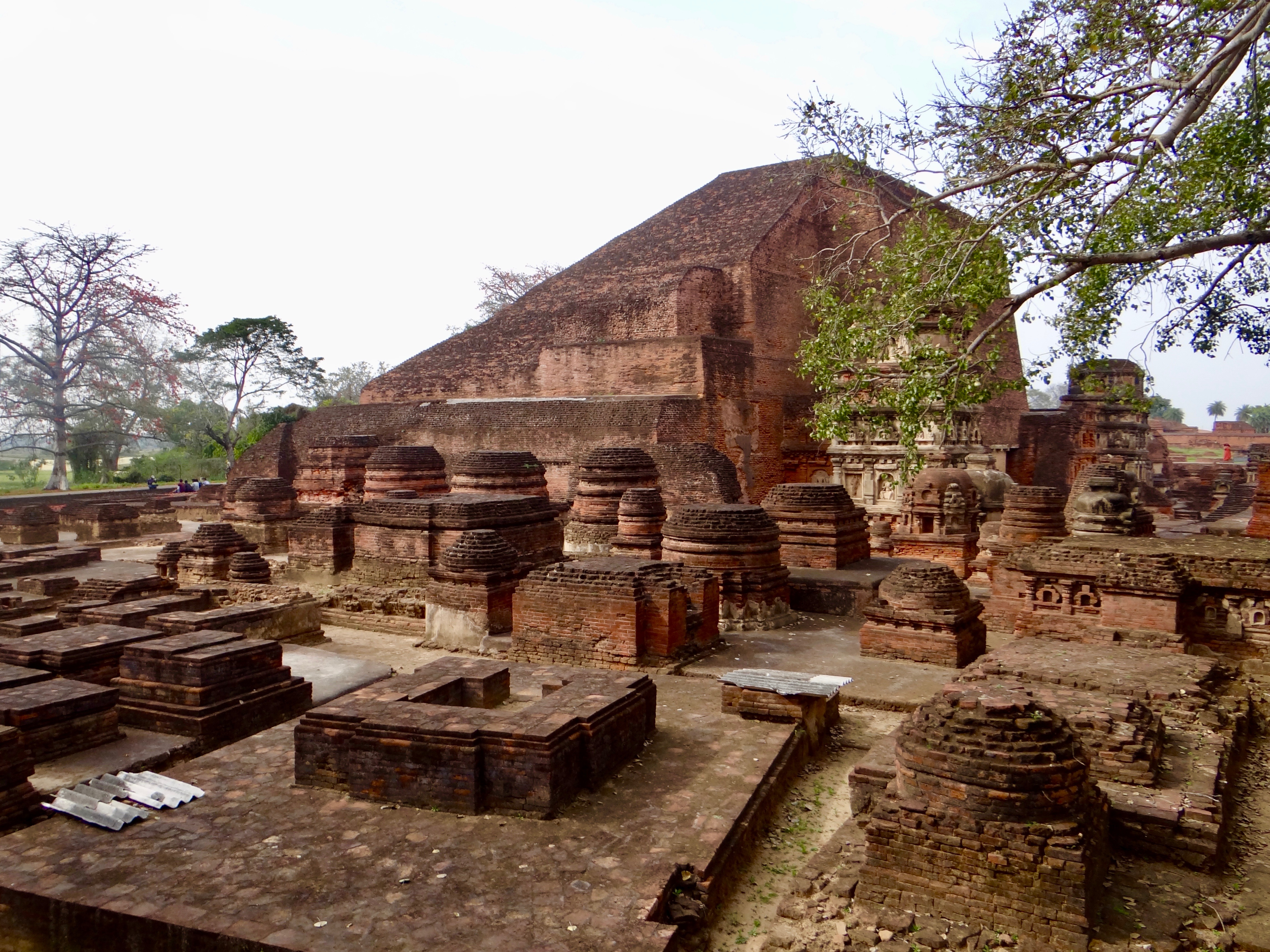
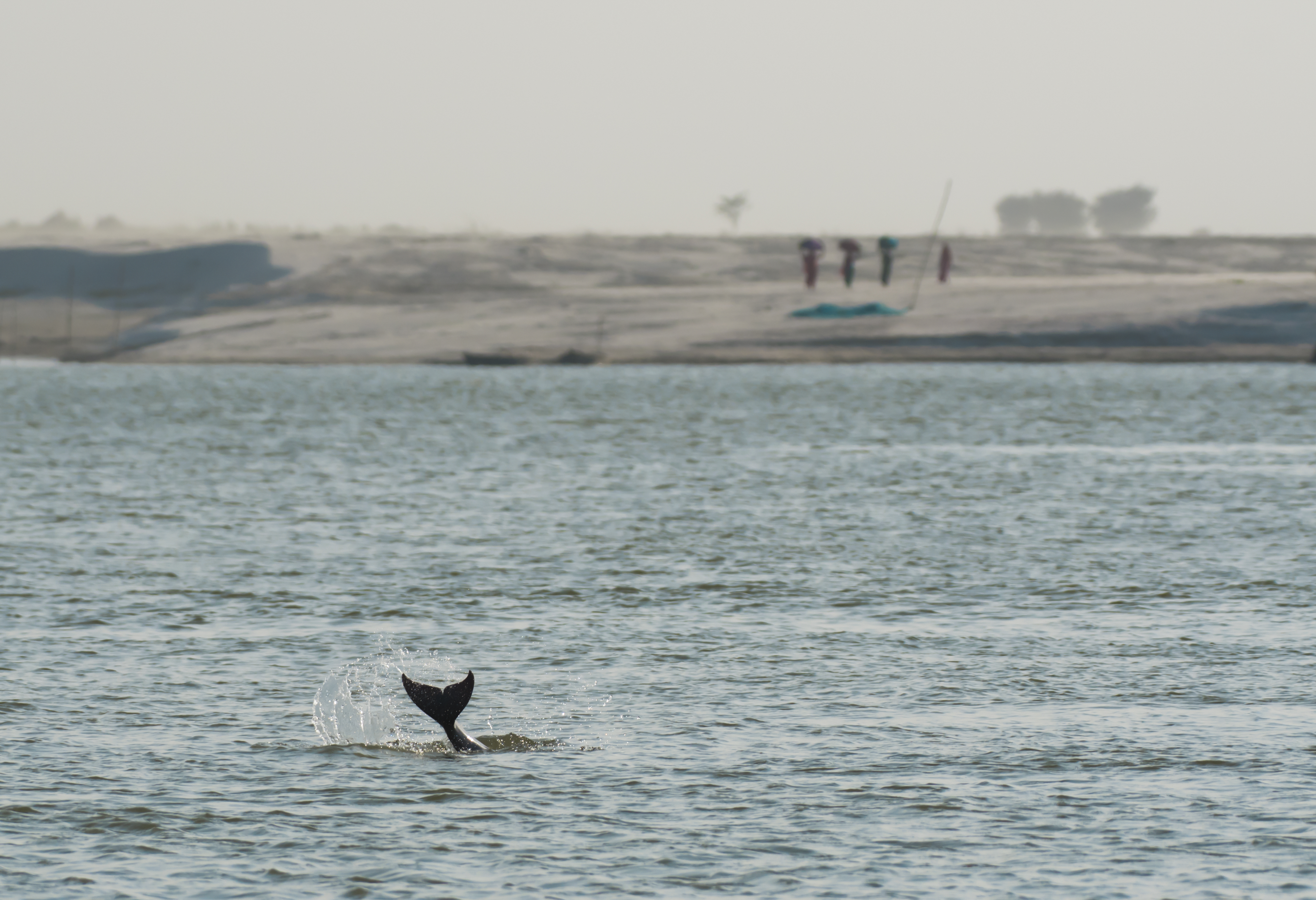
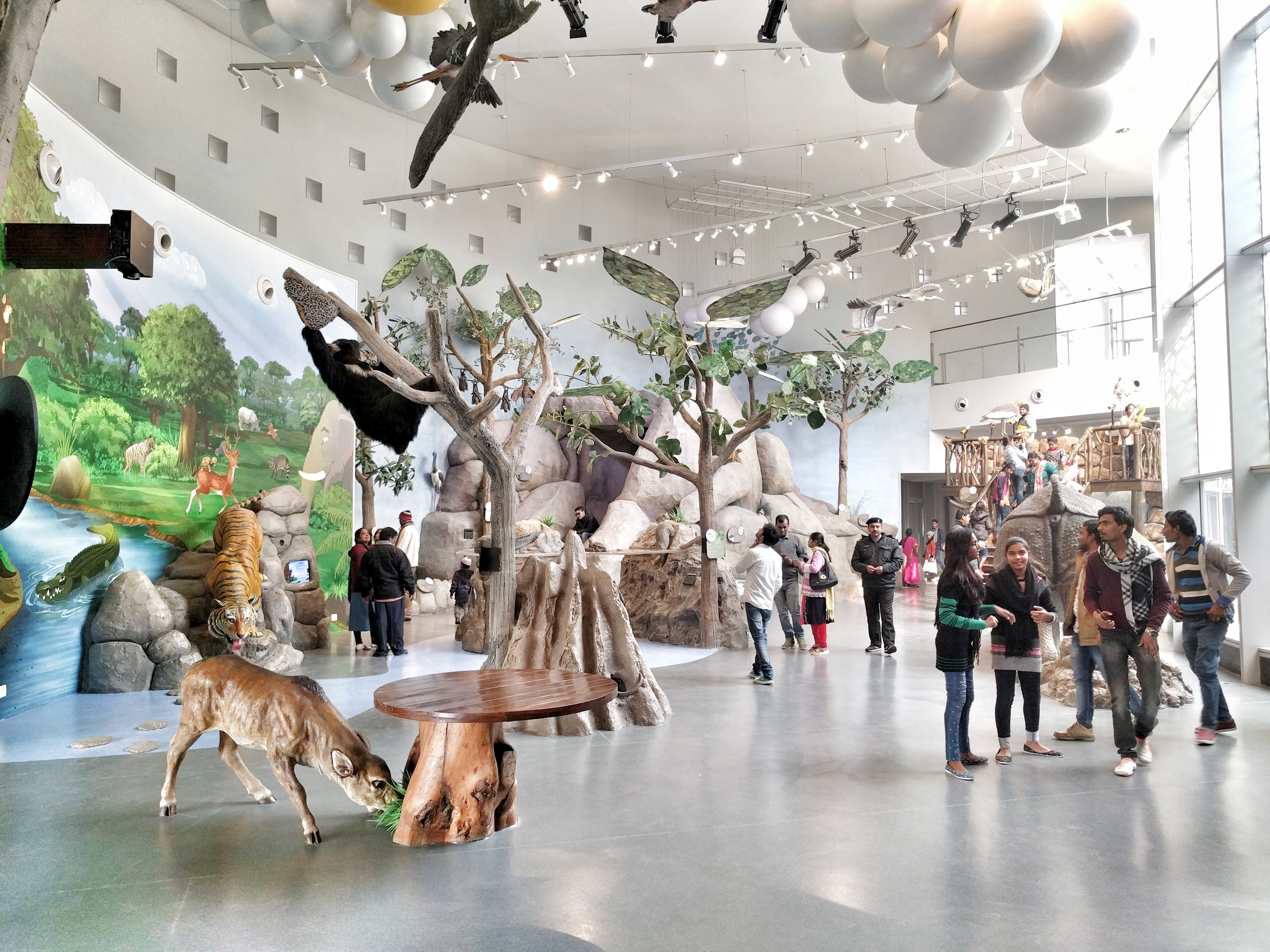
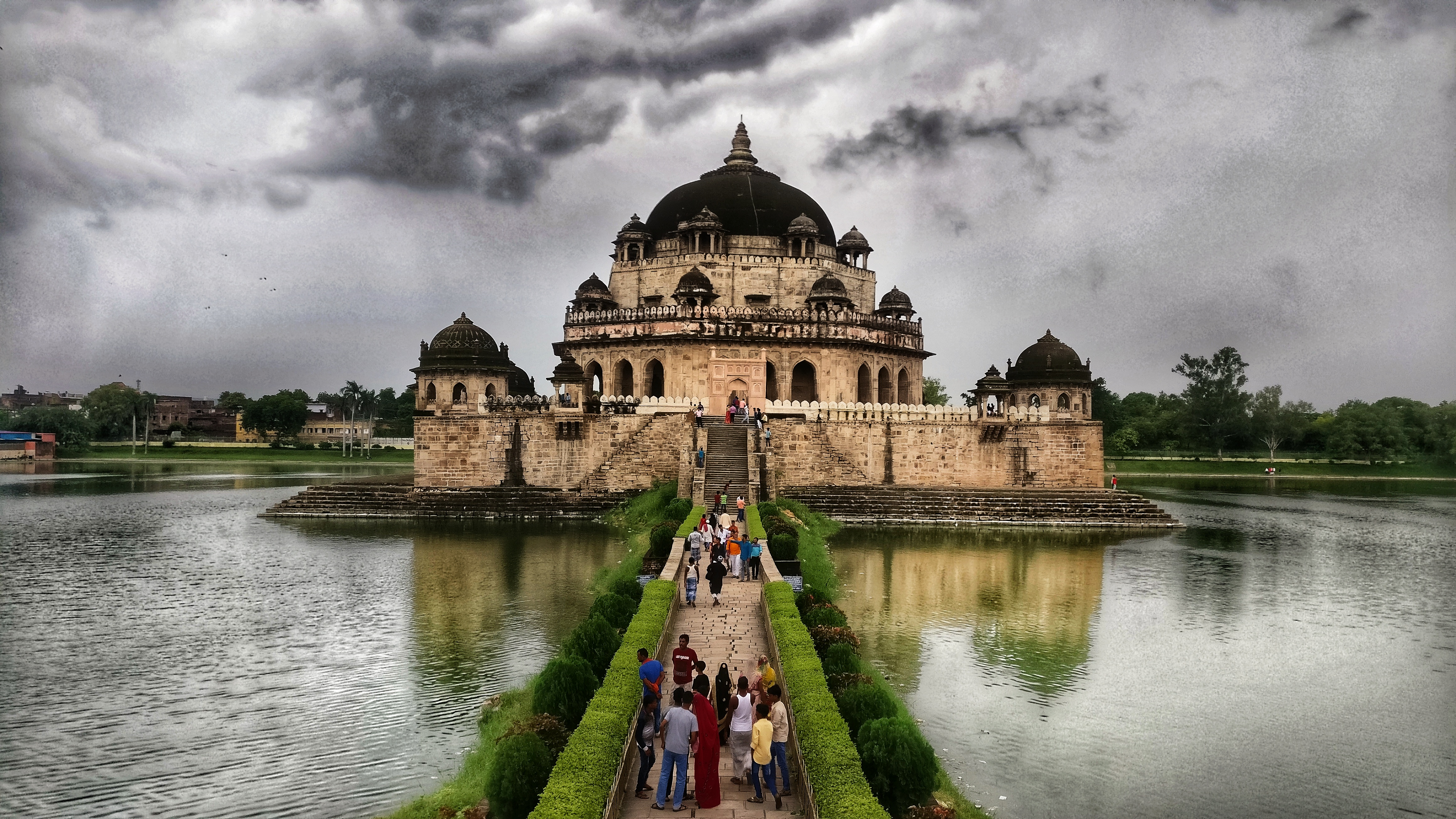
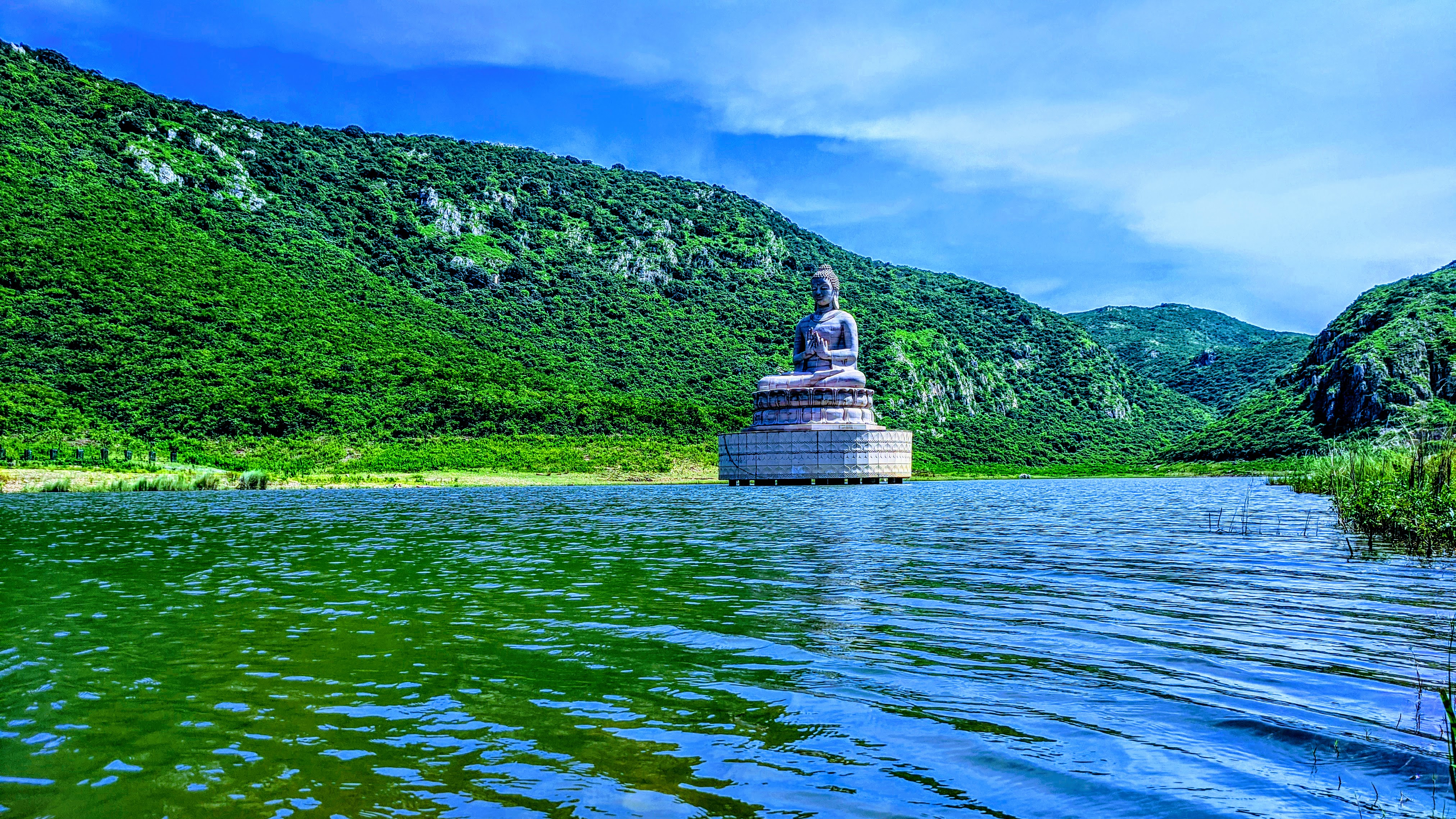
UNESCO World Heritage Site of Mahabodhi Temple and Nalanda, Vikramshila Gangetic Dolphin Sanctuary, Bihar Museum, Tomb of Sher Shah Suri, Ghora Katora

Bihar is visited by many tourists from around the world, In 2019, 33 million tourists visited Bihar, including more than 1 million foreign tourists.

Bihar is home to two UNESCO World Heritage Sites, as well as many other ancient monuments. The Mahabodhi Temple (literally: "Great Awakening Temple"), a UNESCO World Heritage site, is an ancient Buddhist temple in Bodh Gaya, marking the location where the Buddha is said to have attained enlightenment. Bodh Gaya (in Gaya district) is about 96 km (60 mi) from Patna. The Khuda Bakhsh Library, which has one of the world's largest collection of books, rare manuscripts and paintings is located in Patna.

Nalanda Mahavihara, a UNESCO World Heritage site, is among the oldest universities in the world, situated in Nalanda, Bihar. It comprises the archaeological remains of a monastic and scholastic institution dating from the third century BCE to the 13th century CE. It includes stupas, shrines, viharas (residential and educational buildings) and important art works in stucco, stone and metal. Nalanda stands out as the most ancient university of the Indian subcontinent. Archaeological Survey of India has recognised 72 monuments in Bihar as Monuments of National Importance. Furthermore, Archaeological Survey of India has recognised 30 additional monument as protected monuments in Bihar.

Bihar has many places for ecotourism, which includes Valmiki National Park, famous for its national park and tiger reserve. Vikramshila Dolphin Sanctuary is home to the endangered Gangetic Dolphin. Bihar has many wildlife sanctuaries such as Bhimbandh Wildlife Sanctuary, Gautam Buddha Wildlife Sanctuary, Kaimur Sanctuary, Udaypur Wildlife Sanctuary, and the Pant Wildlife Sanctuary. Bihar is host to many species of migratory birds at bird sanctuaries like Kanwar Lake Bird Sanctuary and the Nagi Dam Bird Sanctuary.

Many tourists visit Bihar because of the religious significance of the area. The Hindu Goddess Sita, the consort of Lord Rama, is believed to have been born in Sitamarhi in the Mithila region of modern-day Bihar. Gautama Buddha is believed to have attained Enlightenment at Bodh Gaya, a town located in the modern day district of Gaya in Bihar. Vasupujya, the 12th Jain Tirthankara was born in Champapuri, Bhagalpur. Mahavira, the 24th and last Tirthankara of Jainism, was born in Vaishali around the sixth century BCE. The Śrāddha ritual performed in the Pitru Paksha period is considered to be most powerful in the holy city of Gaya, which is seen as a special place to perform the rite, and hosts a fair during the Pitri Paksha period.

== Transport ==
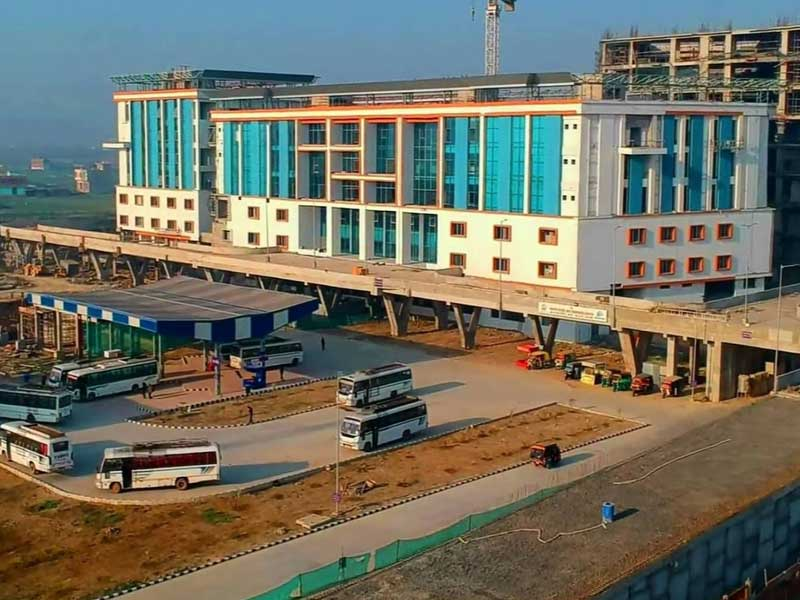
Patliputra ISBT, Patna

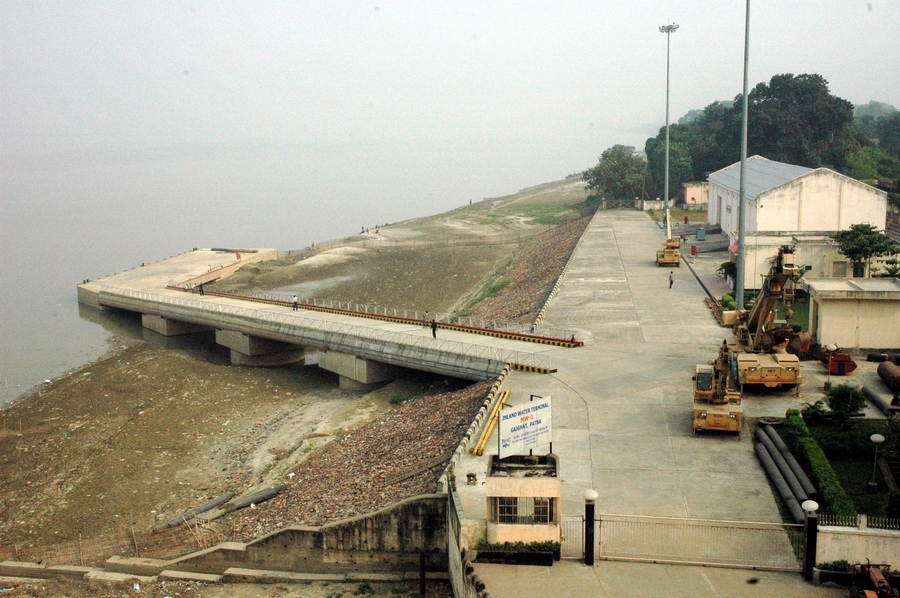
Ganges river port on national inland waterways-1 at Gaighat, Patna

=== Airports ===
Bihar has a total of three operational airports as of 2020: Lok Nayak Jayaprakash Airport in Patna, Gaya Airport in Gaya, and Darbhanga Airport in Darbhanga. All three airports have scheduled flights to major cities around India. Gaya Airport is the only international airport in Bihar, having seasonal flights to countries like Thailand, Bhutan, and Myanmar.

=== Railways ===
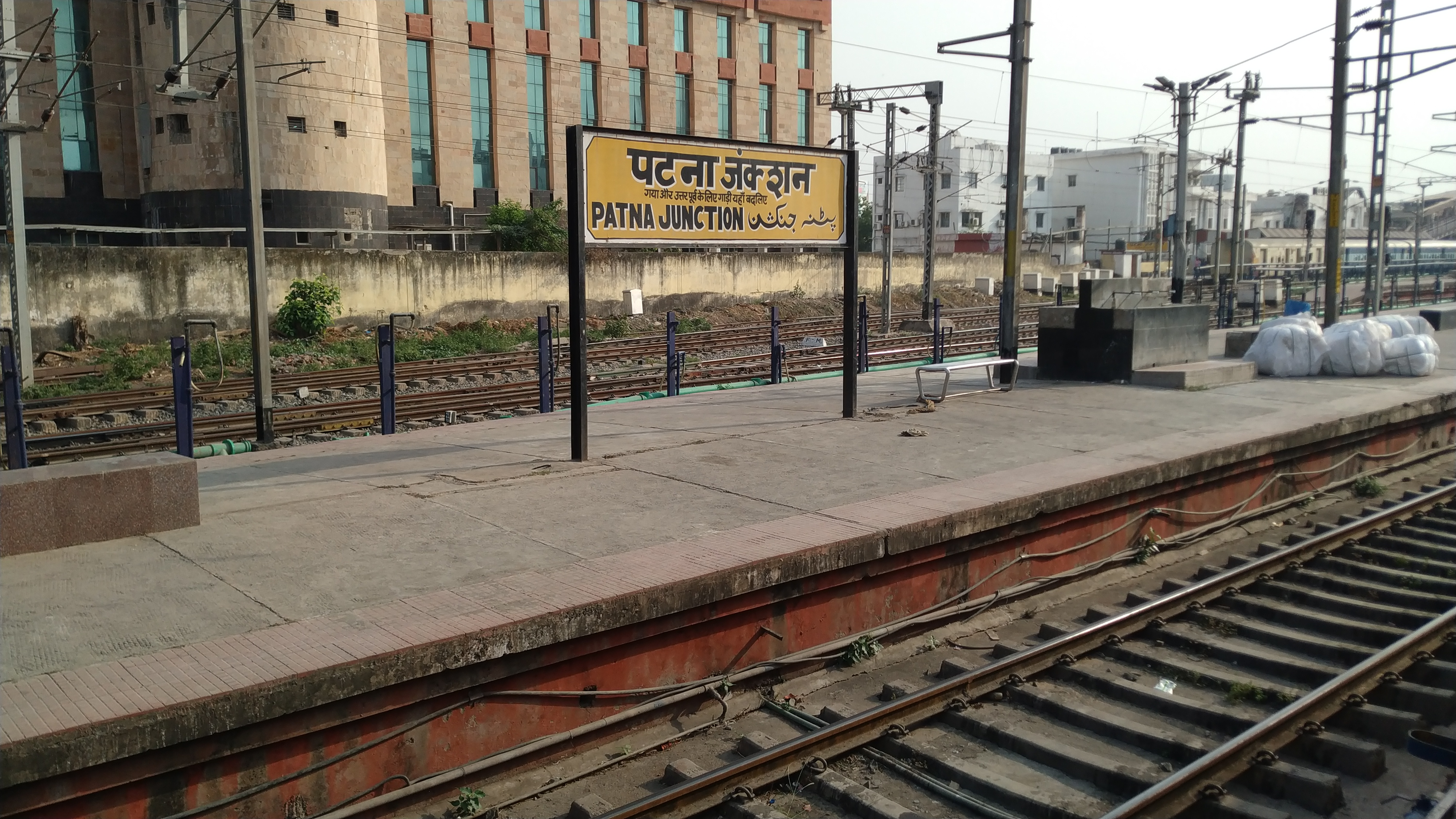
Patna Junction

Bihar has a rail network length of 3,794 km (2,357 mi) in 2020. All major cities, districts and towns are well connected. Munger, Jamalpur and Bhagalpur are well connected with all major Stations of country. Eastern Dedicated Freight Corridor, after completion, will pass through Kaimur, Rohtas, Aurangabad, and Gaya with a total length of 239 km (149 mi) in Bihar.

=== State Expressways and highways ===
Gaya-Darbhanga Expressway (access controlled highway) will be Bihar's first expressway, with a length of 189 km. It is expected to be completed by 2024. Bihar also has state highways with a total length of 4,006 km (2,489 mi) and national highways with a total length of 5,358 km (3,329 mi).

=== Metro transit ===
Patna will be the first city in Bihar to have mass rapid transit system. Patna Metro with network of 31 km (19 mi) length is under construction as of 2022. However, it is currently delayed due to land acquisition process.

=== Bus transit ===
Bihar State Road Transport Corporation (BSRTC) runs interstate, intrastate, and international route buses. BSRTC has a daily ridership of around 100,000. Its fleet includes non-electric and electric buses, and AC and non-AC buses. Delhi, Ranchi, and Kathmandu in Nepal are some of the destinations served outside Bihar. Patliputra Inter-State Bus Terminal is a major bus transit hub in Bihar.

=== Inland Waterways ===
National Waterways-1 runs along the Ganges river. Gaighat in Patna has a permanent terminal of inland waterways for handling cargo vessels. The Ganges is navigable throughout the year, and was the principal river highway across the vast Indo-Gangetic Plain. Vessels capable of accommodating five hundred merchants were known to ply this river in the ancient period, when it served as a conduit for overseas trade. The role of the Ganges as a channel for trade was enhanced by its natural links to major rivers and streams in north and south Bihar.

== Education ==
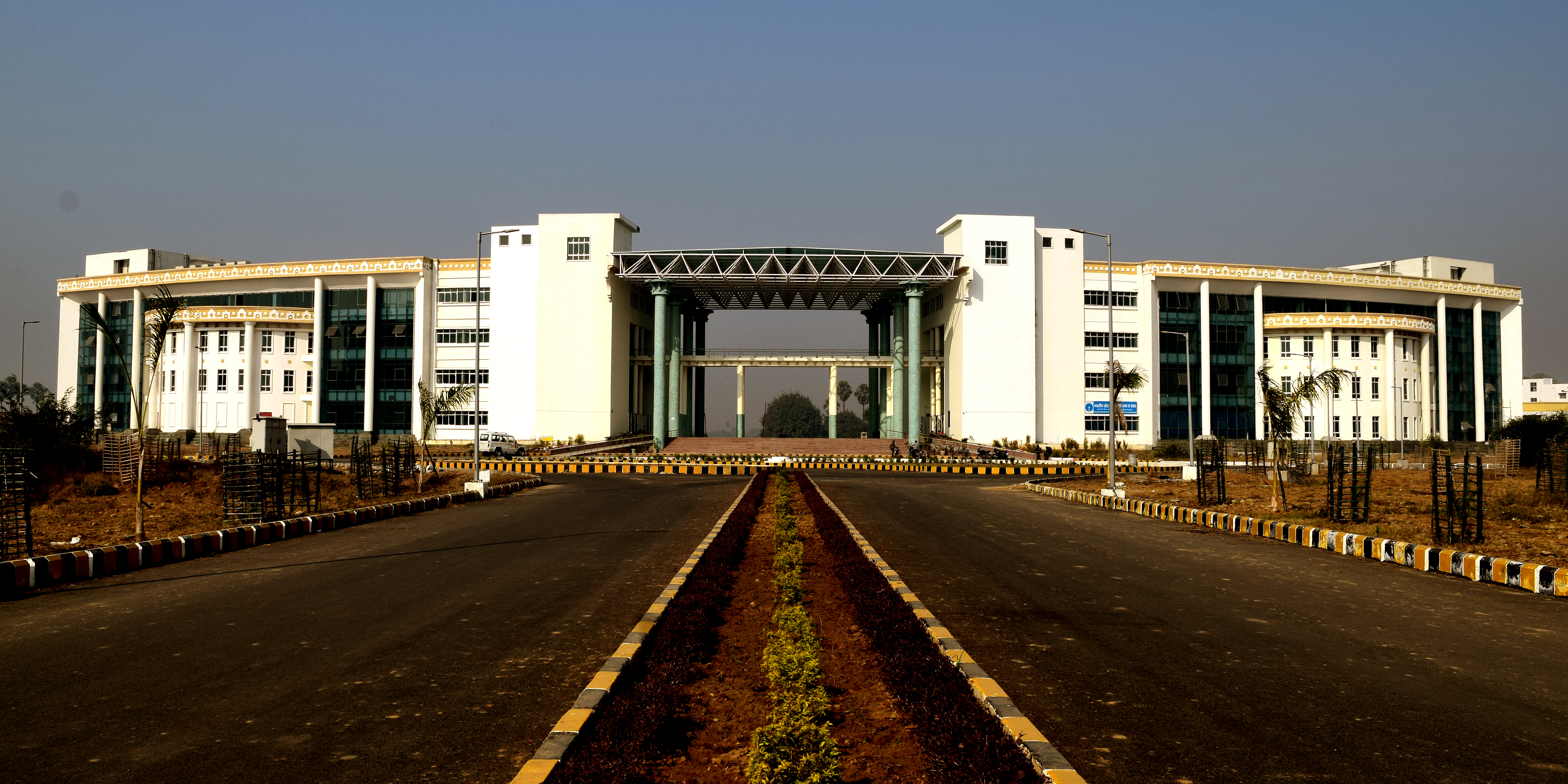
Front view of administrative building of IIT Patna

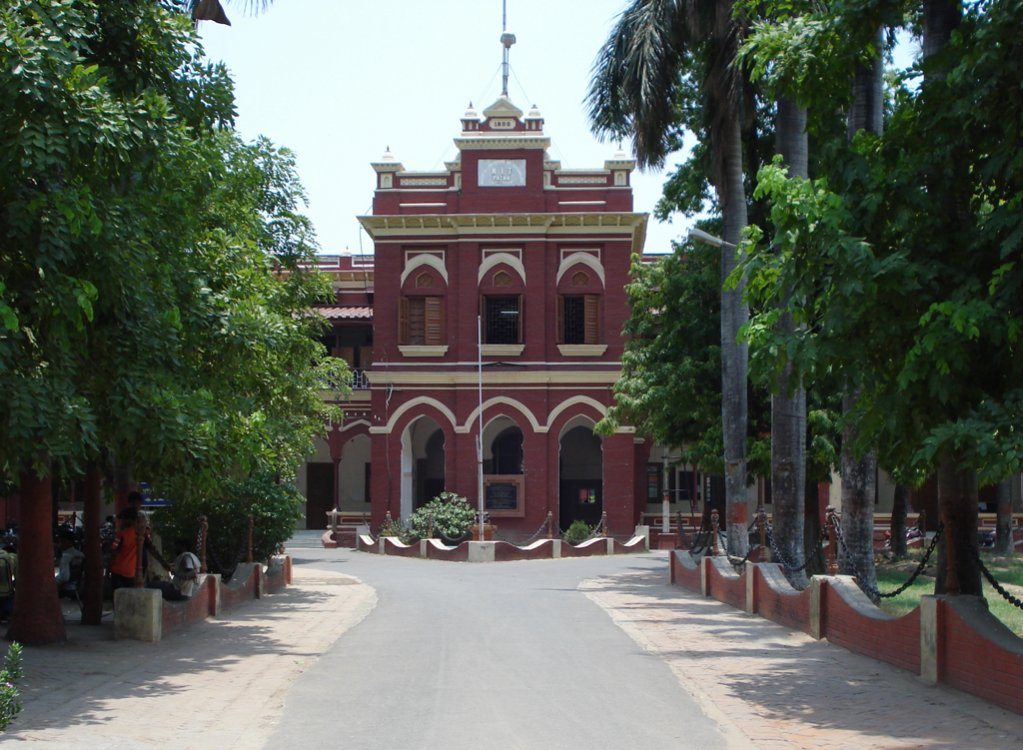
NIT Patna main building

Historically, Bihar has been a major centre of learning, home to the ancient universities of Nalanda (est. 450 CE), Odantapurā (est. 550 CE), and Vikramashila (est. 783 CE). Nalanda and Vikramshila universities were destroyed by the invading forces of Bakhtiyar Khilji in 1200 CE. Bihar saw a revival of its education system during the latter part of the British rule, when Khuda Bakhsh Oriental Library was established in 1891 by Sir Khan Bahadur Khuda Bakhsh which is currently one of the world's largest functioning library and boasts more than five million items. It is known for its paintings and rare manuscripts.

Patna University, the seventh oldest university on the Indian subcontinent, was established in 1917. Some other centres of high learning established under British rule are Patna College (est. 1839), Bihar School of Engineering (est. 1900; now known as National Institute of Technology, Patna), Prince of Wales Medical College (est. 1925; now Patna Medical College and Hospital), Science College, Patna (est. 1928), Patna Women's College, Bihar Veterinary College (est. 1927), and Imperial Agriculture Research Institute (est. 1905; now Dr. Rajendra Prasad Central Agriculture University, Pusa). The Patna University, one of the oldest universities in Bihar, was established in 1917, and is the seventh oldest university of the Indian subcontinent. NIT Patna, the second oldest engineering college of India, was established as a survey training school in 1886 and later renamed as the Bihar College of Engineering in 1932.

Today, Bihar is home to eight Institutes of National Importance: IIT Patna, IIM Bodh Gaya, AIIMS, Patna, NIT Patna, IIIT Bhagalpur, NIPER Hajipur, Khuda bakhsh Oriental Library, and the Nalanda International University. In 2008, Indian Institutes of Technology Patna was inaugurated with students from all over India and in the same year the National Institute of Fashion Technology Patna was established as the ninth such institute in India. The Indian Institute of Management Bodh Gaya was established in 2015. In March 2019, the government of Bihar sent a proposal to the centre government to upgrade Darbhanga Medical College and Hospital into an AIIMS-like institution. Bihar is home of four Central universities which includes Central University of South Bihar, Mahatma Gandhi Central University, Dr. Rajendra Prasad Central Agriculture University and Nalanda University. In 2015, the central government proposed the re-establishment of Vikramshila in Bhagalpur and had designated ₹500 crores (₹5 billion) for it. Bihar also has the National Institute of Fashion Technology Patna, National Law University, Patna Institute of Hotel Management (IHM), Footwear Design and Development Institute, Bihta and Central Institute of Plastic Engineering & Technology (CIPET) Center. CIPET and IHM was established in Hajipur in 1994 and 1998 respectively. Bihar Engineering University was established under Bihar Engineering University Act, 2021 of Bihar Government with the purpose of the development and management of educational infrastructure related to technical, medical, management, and related professional education in Bihar. Based on 2020–21 data, Bihar Engineering University has 56 and Bihar medical science University under the Bihar medical science University act, 2021. There are Pharmacy colleges, 15 Medical colleges, and 36 Nursing colleges after establishing this university. Aryabhatta Knowledge University has 33 educational colleges, 8 community colleges, and one vocational college. Chanakya National Law University and Chandragupt Institute of Management were established in the later half of 2008 and now attracts students from not just within Bihar but also students from far flung states. Nalanda International University was established in 2014 with active investment from countries such as Japan, Korea, and China. The A.N. Sinha Institute of Social Studies is a premier research institute in the state. Bihar has eight medical colleges which are funded by the government, including Patna Medical College and Hospital, Nalanda Medical College and Hospital, Indira Gandhi Institute of Medical Sciences, Darbhanga Medical College and Hospital, Sri Krishna Medical College and Hospital, Jawaharlal Nehru Medical College, Bhagalpur, and five private medical colleges. Bihar has the seven old government engineering colleges; Muzaffarpur institute of technology, Bhagalpur college of Engineering, Gaya college of Engineering, Nalanda College of Engineering, Darbhanga college of Engineering, Motihari college of Engineering, and the Loknayak Jai Prakash Institute of Technology.

Bihta, a suburb of the state capital Patna] is home of institutes like IIT Patna, AIIMS Patna, BIT Patna and is now emerging as an educational hub. With institutes like Super 30, Patna has emerged as a major center for engineering and civil services coaching. The major private IIT-JEE coaching institutes have opened up their branches in Bihar and this has reduced the number of students who go to, for example, Kota and Delhi for engineering/medical coaching.

Bihar e-Governance Services & Technologies (BeST) and the government of Bihar have initiated a unique program to establish a centre of excellence called Bihar Knowledge Center, a school to equip students with the latest skills and customised short-term training programs at an affordable cost. The centre aims to attract the youth of the state to improve their technical, professional, and soft skills, to meet the current requirements of the industrial job market. The National Employability Report of Engineering Graduates, 2014, puts graduates from Bihar in the top 25 per cent of the country, and rates Bihar as one of the three top states at producing engineering graduates in terms of quality and employability.

== See also ==
- Bihar Day
- List of Bihari singers
- Outline of Bihar
- Timeline of Bihar
- Bihari culture
- Cuisine of Bihar
- Chhotanagpur Front
- Chhotanagpur Plateau Praja Parishad
- Zerat
- Bihta Dry Port
- Software Technology Park of India, Darbhanga
