= List of villages in Aurangabad district, Bihar =

List of villages in Aurangabad district, Bihar, India

This is a list of villages in Aurangabad district, Bihar. Trar

- Achuki
- Akauna
- Akorhi
- Amauna (Barun), Aurangabad
- Amauna (Nabinagar), Aurangabad
- Anjanian
- Aranda
- Arthua
- At
- Aurangabad
- Baghakol
- Bahuara
- Barawan
- Barun
- Bhadokhar
- Bhalu Khaira
- Bhelwa
- Chandi
- Chaubara
- Chaukhara
- Damodarpur
- Darar
- Dariyapur
- Daudnagar
- Dehri
- Dhamni
- Dhamni
- Dindir
- Ekauni
- Gahna
- Gaini
- Gajna
- Gangti
- Garwa
- Ghosta
- Harnahi
- Hetampur
- Itkohwa
- Jagdishpur
- Kaithi
- Kajpa
- Khaira Karamdih
- Khudwan
- Koilwan
- kulharia
- Lohra
- Manjhauli, Bihar
- Mansara
- Nabinagar
- Nagain
- Nahro Dehri
- Narayanpur
- Naudiha
- Niman Jodh
- Obra
- Panrepur
- Parasi
- Piru
- Poiwan
- Rafiganj
- Raghunathpur
- Sanri
- Sansa
- Shamshernagar
- Sinduriya
- Surkhi
- Tarari
- Tilauti
- Uphara

== See also ==
- Aurangabad District, Bihar
- List of villages in Bihar
