= Amauna =

Amauna may refer to the following places in the Indian state of Bihar:

- Amauna, Araria
- Amauna (Barun), Aurangabad
- Amauna (Nabinagar), Aurangabad
- Amauna, Rohtas
