= Shamshernagar, India =

Shamshernagar Mayar
- Village
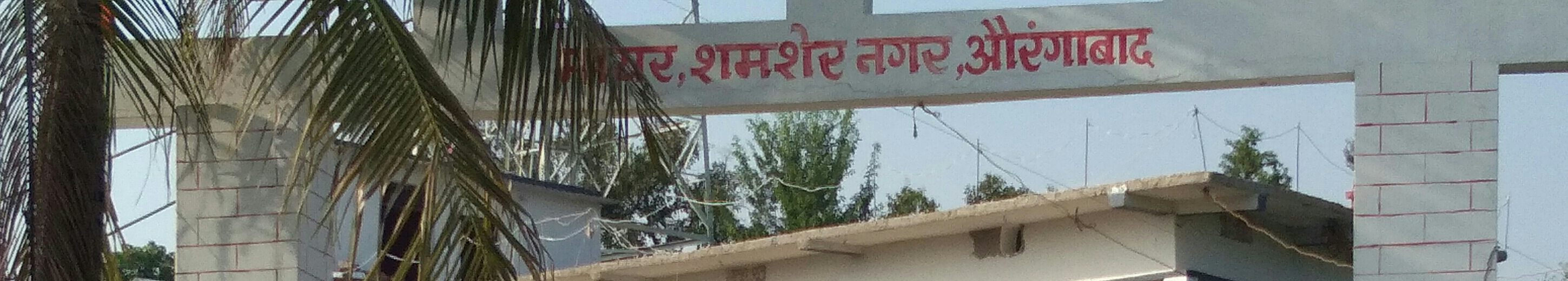
- Shamshernagar Gate

- Location in Bihar, India
- Coordinates: 25.0796°N 84.4540°E
- Country: India
- State: Bihar
- District: Aurangabad
- Founder: Mayurbhatta (Originated) Shamsher khan (Renamed)

Government
  - Type: Gram Panchayat (Panchayati Raj Institution)
  - Body: Gram Kachhari (Sarpanch)(Mukhiya) (Ward)

Area
  - Total: 17.45 km^{2} (6.74 sq mi)
- Elevation: 104 m (341 ft)

Population (2011)Households 1,716
  - Total: 10,229
  - Density: 586.2/km^{2} (1,518/sq mi)
- Demonym: Mairiyan (मैरिय़ा)

Languages
  - Official: Hindi
  - Common: Magahi/Magadhi, English, Urdu
- Time zone: UTC+5:30 (IST)
- PIN Code: 824143
- ISO 3166 code: IN-BR
- Vehicle registration: BR 26
- Sex ratio: 1000:994 ♂/♀
- Literacy rate: 70.78%
- Website: https://aurangabad.bih.nic.in
- Nearest major highway- NH139 (old NH98); Village code 252697 (Census of India)

Shamshernagar is a large village in the Daudnagar subdivision and block in Aurangabad district, located in Bihar, India. The town falls under the jurisdiction of the Magadh division. Situated on the bank of the Sone River, the National Highway 139 (Patna-Aurangabad Road) passes through the village. The Indrapuri Barrage canal is a local waterway. Shamshernagar is densely populated. It has adequate infrastructure, including a middle school, an intermediate high school, an additional Primary Health Centre (now Health Wellness Centre), and a Regional Rural Bank (MBGB). Shamshernagar is an electrified village. and possesses a water tank for its water supply. It shares a border between Aurangabad and Arwal districts. Buses, auto-rickshaws and e-rickshaws provide regional transportation.

== Literacy rate and population ==
According to the 2011 census, Shamshernagar's population is 10,229. Out of this, 5,130 are male and 5,099 female. The village has 1,758 children in the age group of 0–6 years. Among them, 894 are male and 864 are female. The average sex ratio of Shamshernagar village is 994, which is higher than the Bihar state average of 918. The child sex ratio for Shamshernagar as per the census is 966, higher than the Bihar average of 935.

Shamshernagar has a higher literacy rate when compared to Bihar. In the 2011 census, the literacy rate of Shamshernagar is 70.78%, compared with 61.80% for the state as a whole. In Shamshernagar, the male literacy stands at 81.40% while female literacy rate is 60.17%.

== Transportation ==
The nearest railway station is the Anugraha Narayan Road railway station on the Grand Chord section of the Howrah-Delhi main line, near Pawarganj in Aurangabad. Other stations in the locality are Gaya Junction railway station and Patna Junction railway station.

Nearby airports

- Patna Airport
- Gaya Airport

== Notable attractions and tourism ==
- Ancient Sun Temple (Surya Mandir)
- Chhat Puja and Mela
- Dusshera
- Dipawali festival
- Kalaamanch, a stage that organises public cultural programmes
- Historical Makbara (tomb) and Maindan (playground) of the Shamsher Khan, was a local head of Mauza during the Mughal Empire
- Masjid (Mosque)
- Sone River, and canal with five escapes and historic English bridge, built during the British Raj in India

== Gallery ==
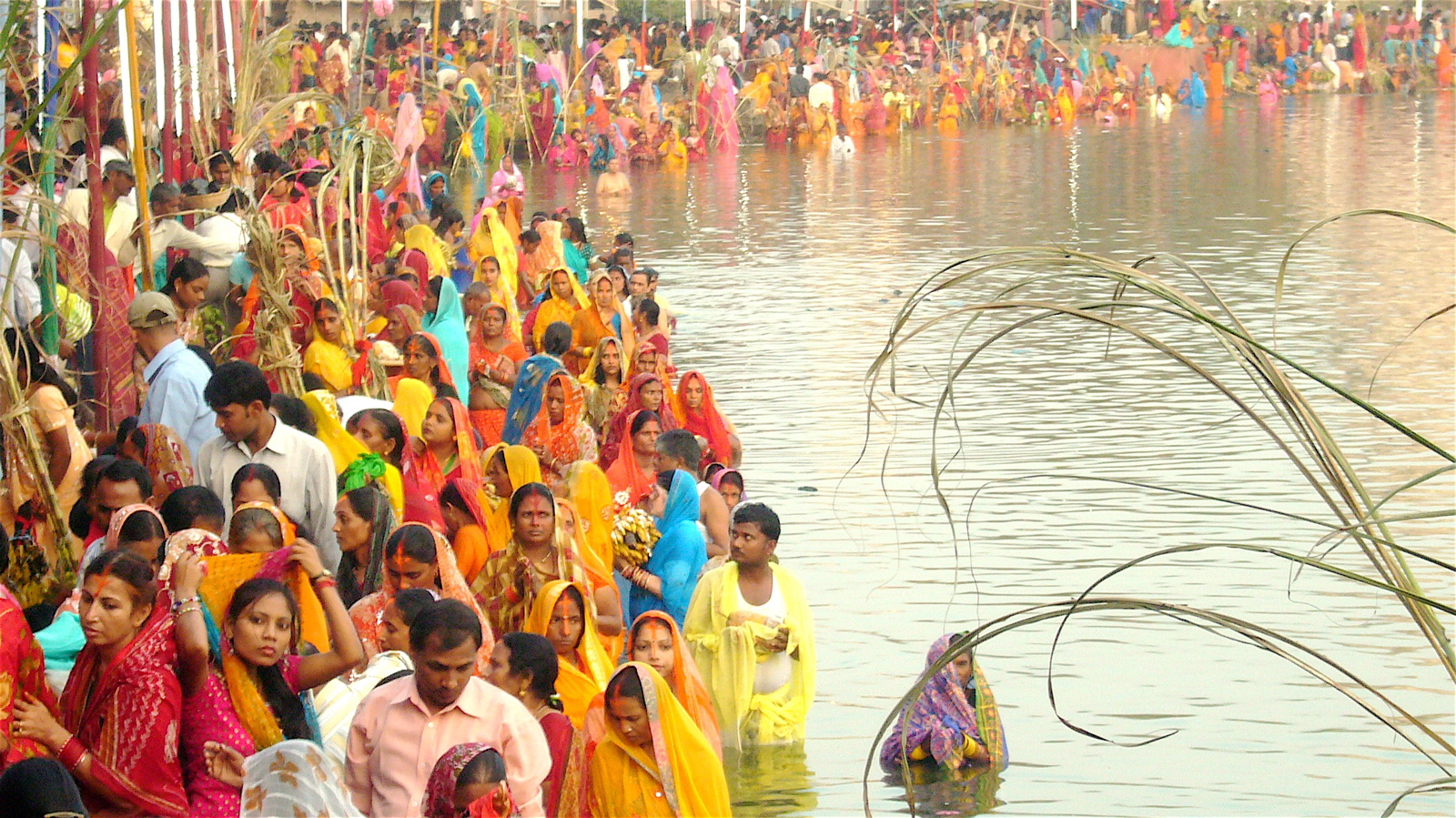
Performing prayer to the sun

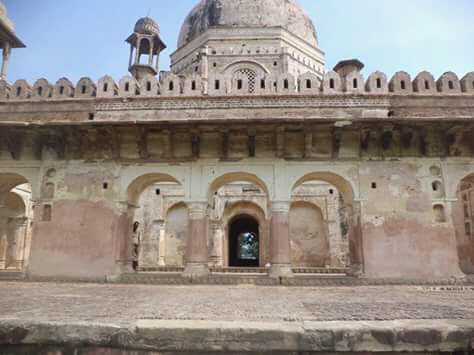
Front view of Shamsher Khan's Makabara

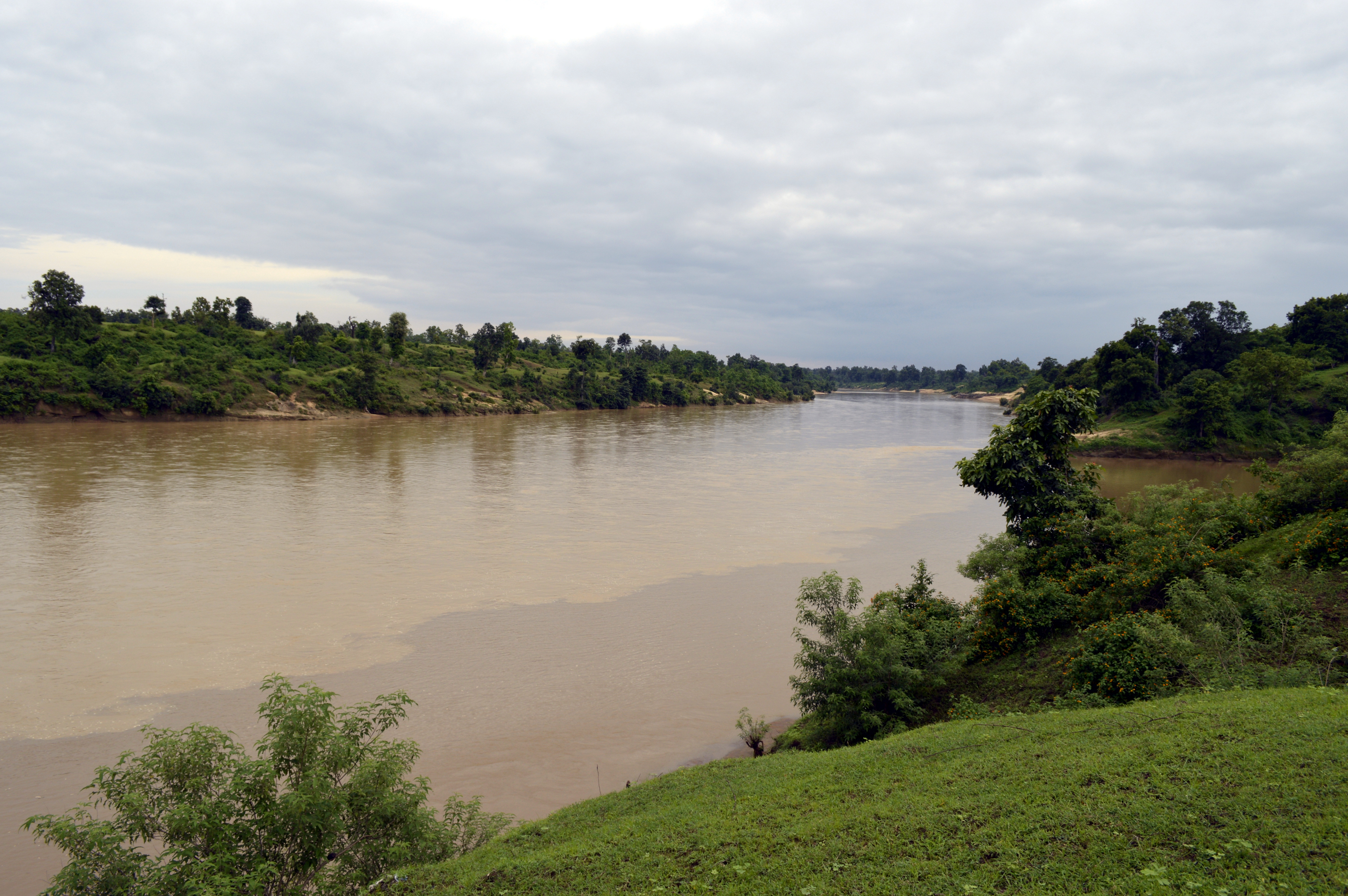
Sone River
