= Uphara =

Village in Bihar, India

- Village
- In Aurangabad, Bihar, India
- Coordinates: 25.08820°N 84.69633°E
- Country: India
- State: Bihar
- District: Aurangabad
- M.P.: Raja Ram Singh Kushwaha (Karakat Lok Sabha constituency)
- MLA: Amrendra Kushwaha (Goh Assembly constituency)
- Mukhiya: Chandra Bhushan Kumar
- Secretary: Sanjeet Kumar Mishra

Area
  - Total: 2.87 km^{2} (1.11 sq mi)
- Elevation: 102 m (335 ft)

Population ((as per census 2011))
  - Total: 3,276
  - Density: 1,140/km^{2} (2,960/sq mi)

Languages
  - Official: Hindi
  - Common: Magahi
- Time zone: UTC+5:30 (IST)
- PIN Code: 824203
- ISO 3166 code: IN-BR
- Vehicle registration: BR 26
- Sex ratio: 1000:918 ♂/♀
- Literacy rate: 65.18%
- Website: Official website
- Nearest major highway- SH 68; Village code 252937 (Census of India)

Uphara (Hindi: उपहारा) is a village located in Goh Block of Aurangabad District in the Indian state of Bihar. The village comes under the postal code 824203 and is governed by Uphara Gram Panchayat. It is located about 12 kilometers from Goh and about 68 kilometers from Aurangabad District. The village falls under the jurisdiction of the Magadh division. Situated on the bank of the Punpun River, SH 68 (Sheoganj, Aurangabad - Baidrabad, Arwal) passes through the village.

It has adequate infrastructure, including a middle school, an additional Primary Health Centre (now Health Wellness Centre), and a Regional Rural Bank (Madhya Bihar Gramin Bank). Uphara is an electrified village. and possesses a water tank for its water supply. It shares a border between Aurangabad and Arwal districts. Buses, auto-rickshaws and e-rickshaws provide regional transportation.

== Literacy rate and population ==
According to the 2011 census, Uphara's population is 3276. Out of this, 1708 are male and 1568 female. Children in the age group of 0 to 6 years make up around 17% of the total population. The sex ratio of the village is 918 females per 1,000 males, which is slightly lower than the state average, while the child sex ratio is 935, indicating a more balanced demographic among younger residents. In village, about 12.24% of the population belongs to the Scheduled Caste community. The village has no residents from the Scheduled Tribe community.

The literacy rate in Uphara stands at 65.18%, which is slightly above the Bihar state average. Male literacy is around 74.79%, whereas female literacy lags behind at 54.67%, indicating a significant gender gap in education. However, the presence of Middle School Uphara, established in 1958, has contributed positively to educational access. This government-run school offers education from classes 1 to 8 and serves nearly 880 students, with an equal representation of male and female teaching staff.

== Transport ==
Nearest railway staion is Rafiganj which is 32 km from Uphara while Gaya Junction railway station railway station is 56 km and Anugraha Narayan Road railway station is 63 km far from Uphara.

Nearby airports

- Patna Airport
- Gaya Airport

== Politics ==
Uphara village falls under the Goh Assembly constituency for state legislative elections and is part of the Karakat (Lok Sabha constituency) for parliamentary elections.

== Notable attractions and tourism ==
- Devi Sthan
- Chhat Puja and Mela
- Dusshera
- Dipawali festival
- Punpun River,

== Gallery ==
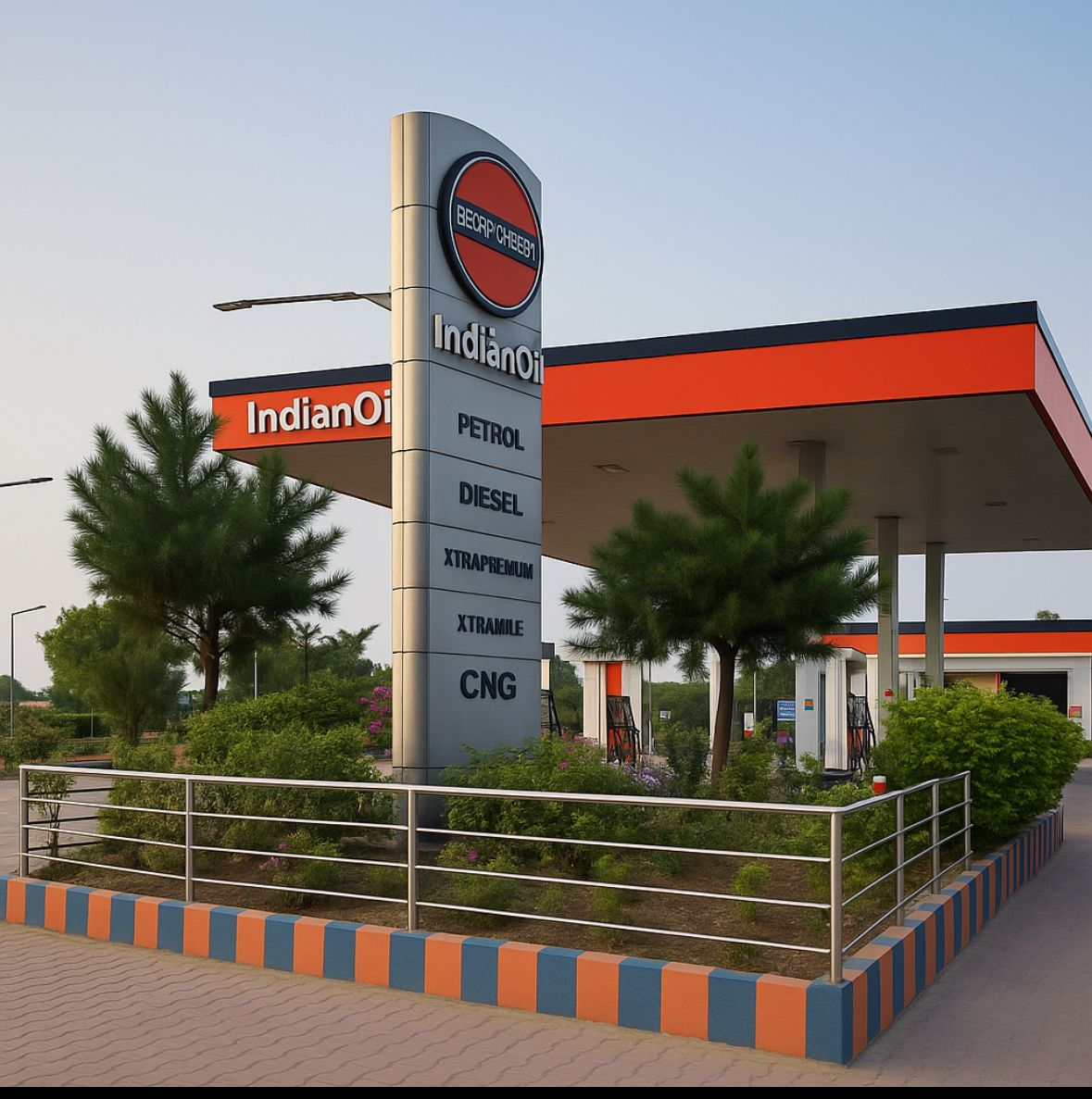
Indian Oil Petrol pump on SH 68 in Upahara

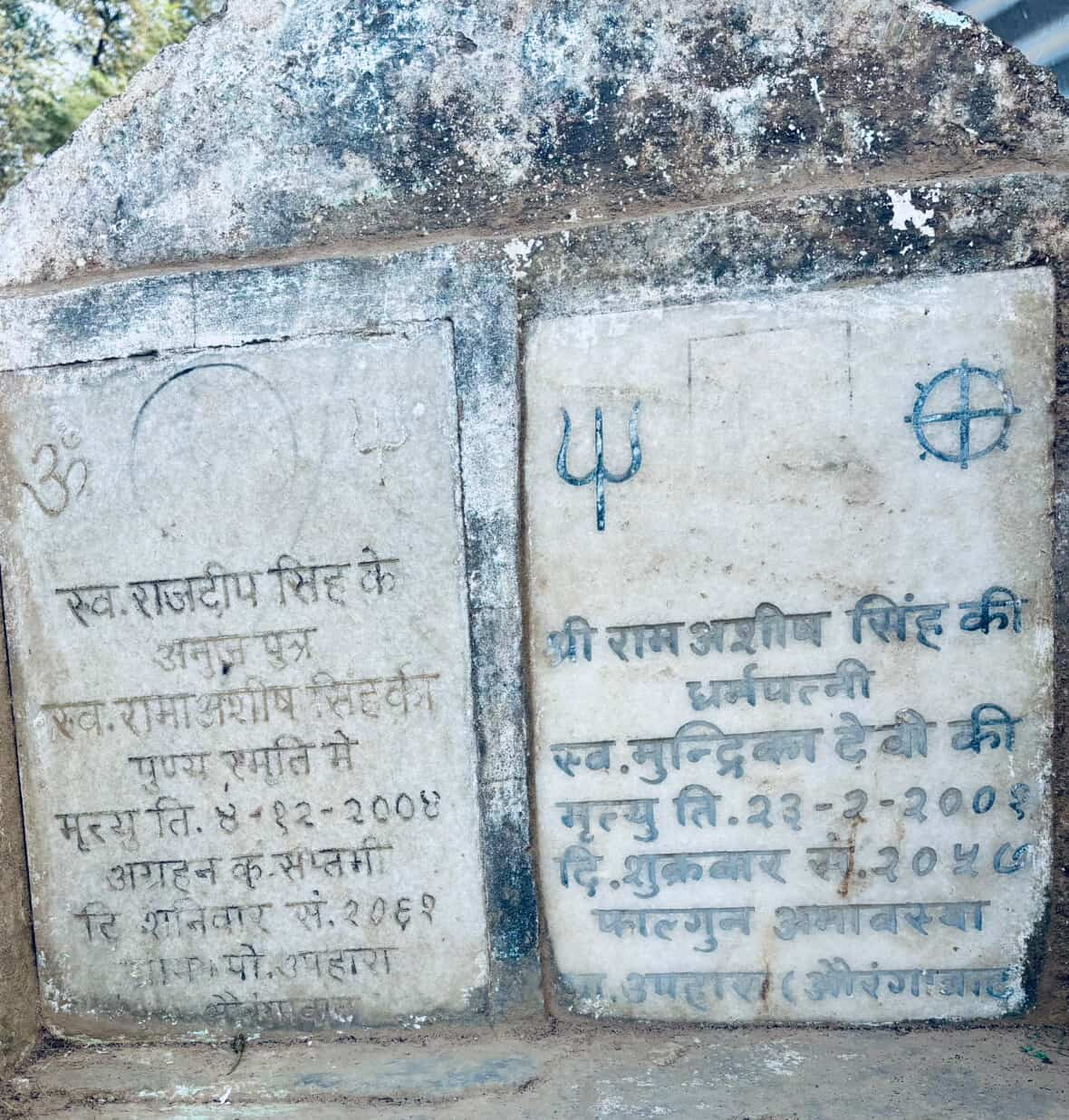
BHOLA SINGH SMRITI STHAL on Uphara-Senari road, Uphara
