= Gajna =

Village in Bihar, India

- village
- Country: India
- State: Bihar
- District: Aurangabad

Population (2011)
  - Total: 704

Languages
  - Official: Hindi
- Time zone: UTC+5:30 (IST)

Gajna is a village in Aurangabad district in the Indian state of Bihar.

== Population ==
Gajna is a medium size village located in Nabinagar Block of Aurangabad district, Bihar with total 131 families residing. The Gajna village has population of 704 of which 344 are males while 360 are females as per Population Census 2011.

In Gajna village population of children with age 0-6 is 120 which makes up 17.05% of total population of village. Average Sex Ratio of Gajna village is 1047 which is higher than Bihar state average of 918. Child Sex Ratio for the Gajna as per census is 791, lower than Bihar average of 935.

== Education ==
Gajna village has lower literacy rate compared to Bihar. In 2011, literacy rate of Gajna village was 56.68% compared to 61.80% of Bihar. In Gajna Male literacy stands at 62.45% while female literacy rate was 51.47%.

== Work profile ==
In Gajna village out of total population, 244 were engaged in work activities. A total of 8.61% of workers describe their work as Main Work (Employment or Earning more than six months) while 91.39% were involved in Marginal activity providing livelihood for less than six months. Of 244 workers engaged in Main Work, 3 were cultivators (owner or co-owner) while 15 were Agricultural labourer.
