= Dindir =

Village in Aurangabad, Bihar

Coordinates: 25°04′N 84°36′E

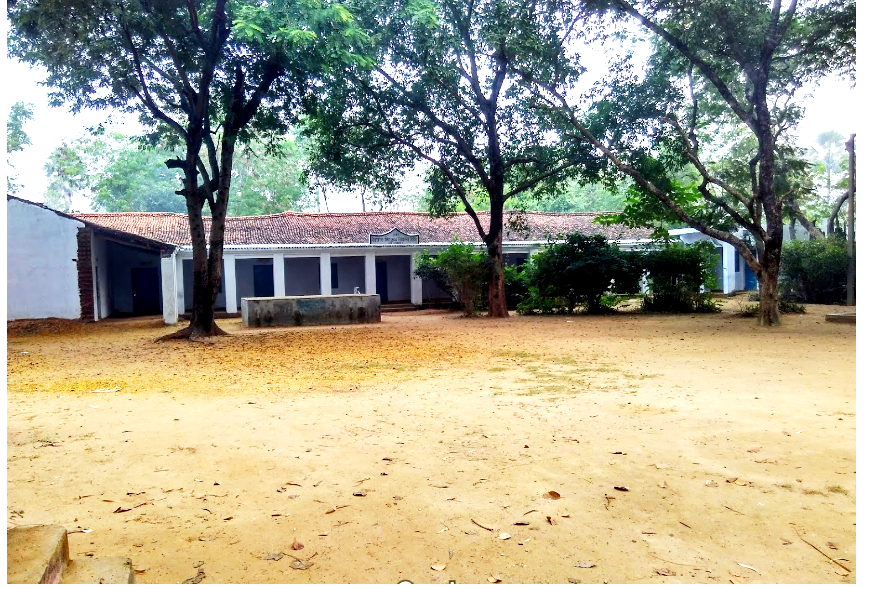
High school Dindir

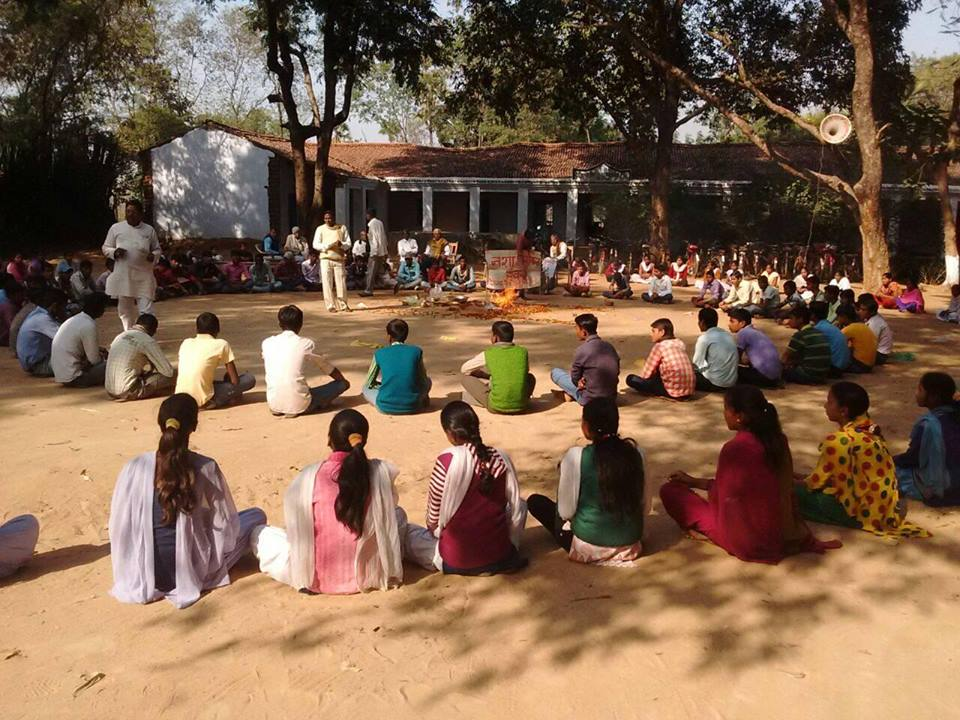
High school Dindir

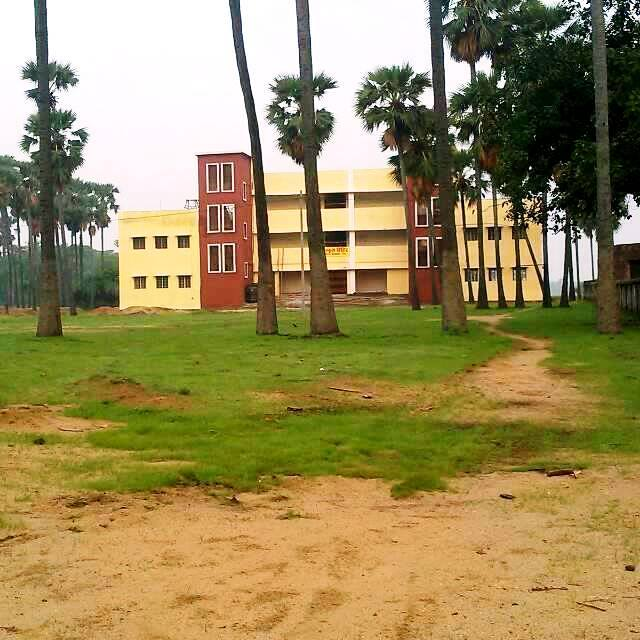
Government Residential school Dindir

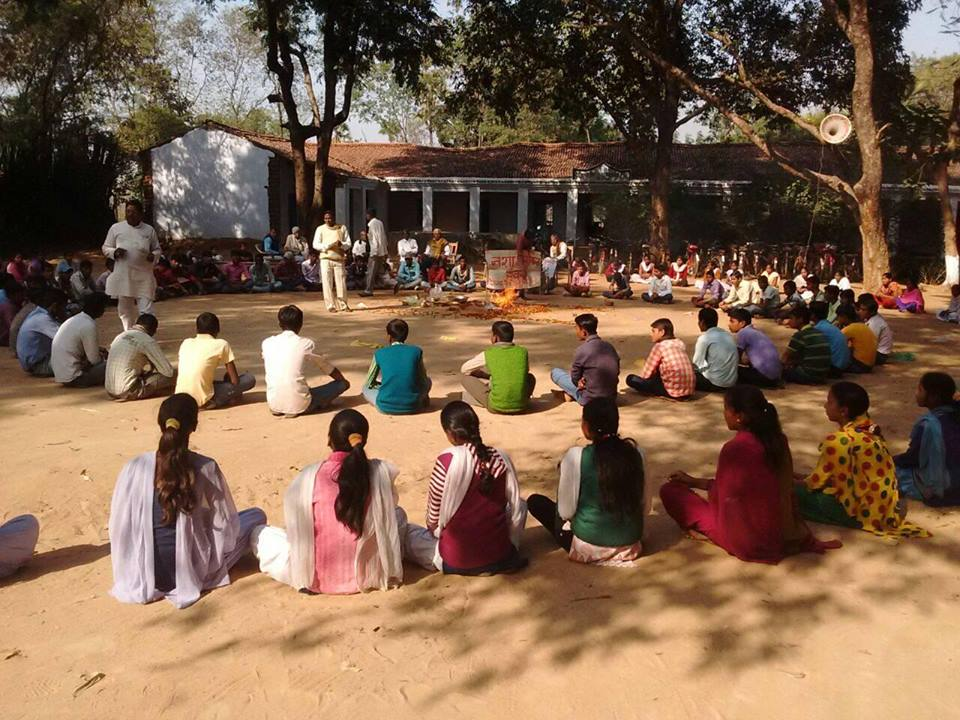
High School Dindir

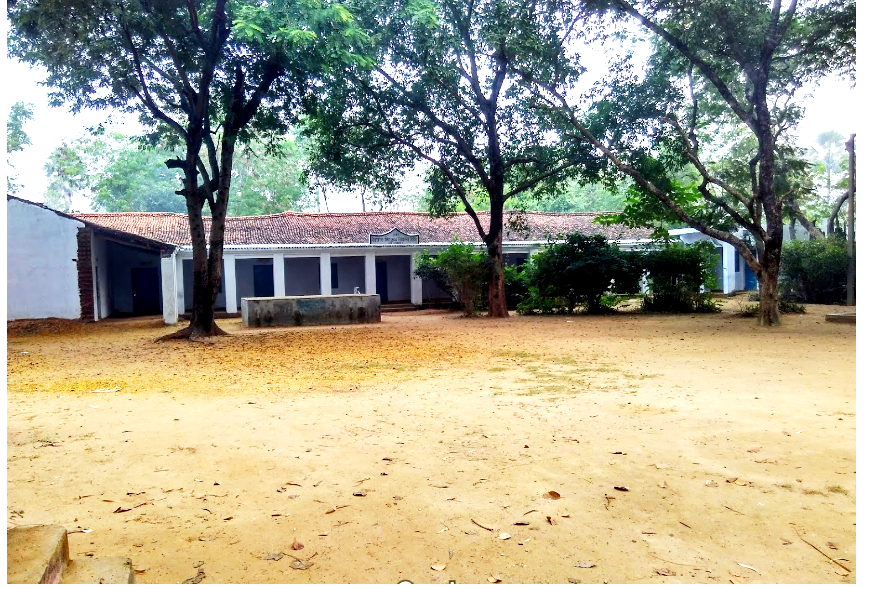
High School, Dindir

Dindir is a village in Aurangabad District of Bihar, India. It is located 48 km north from District headquarter Aurangabad, 7 km east from Haspura and 94 km south from Patna. Area wise it is the largest village of district Aurangabad and is designated as ideal village. Dindir Pin code is 824120 and postal head office is Haspura.

== Schools ==
1. Devchand singh High school (Semi Government).
2. Rajkiye Buniyadi Vidyalaya (Government).
3. middle school (Government).
4. Model school (Government).
5. private school
