= Surkhi, Bihar =

Surkhi
- Village
- Country: India
- State: Bihar
- District: Aurangabad
- Block: Obra

Population (2011)
  - Total: 1,067

Surkhi is a small village in Obra Block in Aurangabad District in Bihar, India. Surkhi is under Sonahuli Panchayat.

== Demographics ==
The total population of the village is 1,067. The number of households in Surkhi is 127. Female to male ratio of Surkhi is 95.06% compared to the Bihar's female to male ratio 91.93%. The literacy rate of the village is 74.47% compared to the literacy rate of state 47%.The female literacy rate is 65.8%. The male literacy rate is 79.46%. The total working population is 24.94% of the total population. 47.09% of the men are working population. 2.38% of the women are working population. The main working population is 19.06% of the total population. 37.3% of the men are main working population. 0.48% of the women are main working population. While the marginal working population is 5.88% of the total population. 9.79% of the men are marginal working population. 1.9% of the women are marginal working population. The total non-working population is 75.06% of the total population. 52.91% of the men are non-working population. 97.62% of the women are non-working population.

== Transportation ==
Surkhi is reachable by Anugraha Narayan Road railway station.

== Notable persons from Surkhi include ==
- Er. Surendra Pandey

== Geography ==
Surkhi is situated in the eastern part of India. River Punpun is flown just 1 km north from the village. Surkhi is situated on the River Adri. Obra, Barun, Aurangabad, Daudnagar, are the nearby towns to Surkhi.

== Economy ==
The economy of Surkhi is mainly dependent in agriculture.

== Education ==
Schools include:

- Rajkiyekrith prathmic vidyalaya.
- Adarsh High School.
- Adarsh Inter College
