= Gahna =

- Village
- Location in Bihar, India Gahna (India)
- Coordinates: 25.03°N 84.4°E
- Country: India
- State: Bihar
- District: Aurangabad
- Founder: Kamran Khan

Government
  - Type: Village
- Elevation: 90 m (300 ft)

Population (2011)
  - Total: 2,522
- Time zone: UTC+5:30 (IST)
- Postal code: 824120
- Area code: 06328
- ISO 3166 code: IN-BR
- Vehicle registration: BR 26

Gahna is a village under Haspura block, Aurangabad district of Bihar, India.

Gahna is a village in Aurangabad District of Bihar, India. It is located 48 km north from District headquarter Aurangabad, 4 km north from Haspura and 90 km south from Patna. Area wise it is the average village of district Aurangabad and is designated as ideal village. Gahna Pin code is 824120 and postal head office is Haspura.
