= Arthua =

- panchayet (village)
- Location in Bihar, India Arthua (India)
- Coordinates: 24.82°N 84.65°E
- Country: India
- State: Bihar
- District: Aurangabad district
- Elevation: 89 m (292 ft)

Languages
  - Official: Maithili, Hindi
- Time zone: UTC+5:30 (IST)

Arthua is a panchayat (village) in Aurangabad district in the Indian state of Bihar.

== Language ==
The languages of Arthua are Hindi and Urdu and most of the villagers speak both.

== Transportation ==
The nearest railway station to Arthua is Rafiganj, located around 9.1 kilometer away. Other railway stations and their distance from Arthua are:

Guraru railway station	18.7 km.
Jakhim railway station	26.3 km.
Gaya Jn railway station	38.8 km.

Arthua's nearest airport is Gaya International Airport located at a distance of 33.9 km away. Another airport around Arthua is Lok Nayak Jayaprakash Airport, 136.1 km removed from Arthua.

== Education ==
Schools in the Arthua area are:

Arthua High School	0.7 km.
Urdu Middle School Budhaul	4.3 km.
Pirwan Middle School	6.7 km.
