= Kajpa =

Village in Bihar, India

Kajpa is a modern village situated in Aurangabad District of Bihar, India. It comes under village panchayat Kajpa. Kajpa is big Village in Aurangabad.

== Transport ==
It is connected by Rail and Road. This village is the business centre of more than two Village Panchayat. Jakhim Railway Station (ECR) is situated in the perimeter of village Kajpa where eight mail/express trains and ten passenger trains stop. In future there will be stoppage of Mahabodhi exp, howrah mumbai mail, 15109-10 BUDH PURNIMA EXP & Jalianwala B Express -18103-18104 which is requested by Jan Sangharsh Samiti.

This village comes under Rafiganj block which is 12 km east of Kajpa. The post office is Jakhim (Pin code 824122). The main market of these Panchayat are Rafiganj, Dehri-on-sone, Gaya and Aurangabad.

== Demographics ==
A total 506 families residing. The Kajpa village has population of 3346 of which 1727 are males while 1619 are females as per Population Census 2011.

In Kajpa village population of children with age 0-6 is 626 which makes up 18.71% of total population of village. Average human sex ratio of Kajpa village is 937 which is higher than Bihar state average of 918. Child sex ratio for the Kajpa as per census is 994, higher than Bihar average of 935.

== Education ==
Kajpa village has higher literacy rate compared to Bihar. In 2011, literacy rate of Kajpa village was 67.76% compared to 61.80% of Bihar. In Kajpa male literacy stands at 76.01% while female literacy rate was 58.84%. For primary education there is Rajkiya Madhya Vidhalay (middle school) upto class 8 is present here. And for secondary education, Roop Narayan High School situated in Jakhim village of Kajpa which is nearly 1km north-west of Kajpa. Some private schools are also here, most popular is Kajpa Public School Kajpa.

As per constitution of India and Panchyati Raaj Act, Kajpa village is administrated by Mukhiya (head of Panchayat). Presently Mrs. Mamta Kumari is the head of Panchayat.
