= Sansa, Aurangabad =

Coordinates: 24°04′N 79°07′E

Sansa is a village in Aurangabad district, Bihar, India. The village is situated on the road joining Daudnagar to Haspura.

== Nearby educational institutions ==
B.L. Indo Anglian Public School, Aurangabad, on NH-98 25 km from Daudnagar
