= Itkohwa =

Itkohwa is one of the villages under Block-Madanpur, Aurangabad district, Bihar, India. The village is bounded by Bijuliya and Basant. Gaya is its nearest largest city and the neighboring district headquarters.

== History ==
The common belief is that the village was a sati-asthal once, but during Raja Ram Mohan Roy-led reforms and initiatives of Lord William Bentinck it was completely abolished.

== Statistics ==
- Headquarters: Chowk
- Area: Total 5,000 m^{2}
- Population: Total: 200–250
- Agriculture: wheat, potato, rice, seasonal vegetables
- Temperature: minimum 4 °C, maximum 42 °C
- Location of Itkohwa In Bihar
- Administrative division Magadh
- Headquarters Aurangabad, India
- Literacy rate 80%
- Lok Sabha Constituencies Aurangabad
- Vidhan Sabha Constituency: Rafiganj
- Major highways NH 2
- 24°44'6.58"N, 84°37'40.54"
