= Tilauti =

Indian village in Aurangabad district, Bihar

Coordinates: 24°59′N 84°34′E

Tilauti is a village in Aurangabad district, Bihar, India. The village has a population of about more than 1,000 people.

== Geography ==
Tilauti lies between Punpun river from the west, Deohara in the south, Madar river in north, and forest in east.

Post of Tilauti is Shekhpura and the police station is in Shekhpura.

== History ==
Local people say that this village has Nakti Bhavani temple located near the meeting point of the Punpun and Madar rivers. It is believed that Maharishi Bhrigu performed penance at this place. The temple has an old idol of Goddess Bhavani, which is associated with Sage Bhrigu. As the nose of the idol is broken, people began calling the goddess Nakti Bhawani.

Local people also believe that the famous Bhrigu Samhita, an ancient book on Hindu astrology, was written here. Every year, on the occasion of Kartik Purnima, a fair (Mela) is held on the banks of the Punpun and Madar rivers, It is an old tradition that brings together people from the surrounding villages every year.

== Markets ==
Deohara is the local market of this village which lies 3km from Tilauti, the village is connected with road and power supply. Deohara is a village in Goh sub-division of the Aurangabad district.
