= Polpol =

Village in Jharkhand, India

Coordinates: 23.970°N 84.186°E

Polpol is a village of Palamau district, situated 16 km from the nearest district town, Medininagar. National Highway 39 crosses this village. Betla National Park is in its vicinity. Neighbouring villages are Barewa, Sarja, Pokhraha, Lahlahe, Sinduriya, Jhabar, and Nawadih. It has a bank, government and private schools, hospitals and a weekly market. The local language is Hindi.

== Education ==
Literacy rate of this village is approximately 40%. Significant schools and colleges include:

- Mahatma Gandhi Govt. High School
- Sri Sarweshwari Manglam Vidya Mandir (Sewa Ashram School)
- Mediniroy Shiksha Niketan
- Saraswati Shishu Mandir
- Rajkiya Buniyadi Vidyalaya
- Bright Future Public School
