= Pitwans =

- village
- Location in Bihar, India Pitwans (India)
- Coordinates: 25°23′38″N 84°56′16″E
- Country: India
- State: Bihar
- District: Patna

Population
  - Total: 2,539

Languages
  - Official: Magahi, Hindi English
- Time zone: UTC+5:30 (IST)
- PIN: 804452
- Telephone code: 0612
- Vehicle registration: BR
- Sex ratio: 1.03 ♂/♀
- Literacy: 62.34%

Pitwans is one of the villages in Patna district. Pitwans is present in block Naubatpur.The village is located on the banks of river Punpun, a tributary of river Ganges.

== Demographics ==
According to [2001] census it has total 441 households with total population of 2,539 (male:1294 & female: 1254).
