= Baghakol, Haspura =

Baghakol
- village
- Location in Bihar, India Baghakol (India)
- Coordinates: 25°01′41″N 84°29′56″E
- Country: India
- State: Bihar
- District: Aurangabad

Languages
  - Official: Hindi
- Time zone: UTC+5:30 (IST)
- PIN: 824115
- ISO 3166 code: IN-BR
- Nearest city: Daudnagar

Baghakol is a village located in Haspura Tehsil of Aurangabad district of Bihar, India.
