= Akauna, Aurangabad =

Akauna
- Village
- Country: India
- State: Bihar
- district: Aurangabad
- block: Goh

Population (2011)
  - Total: 675

Akauna is a village located in Goh block, Aurangabad district, Bihar, India. It is located 4 km (2.5 mi) away from the block's headquarters. It was the home of Thakur Muneshwar Nath Singh, who was the Minister of Bihar.

== Population ==
Akauna has a total of 84 houses in it. The Akauna village has population of 675 of which 353 are males and 321 are females as per the Population Census of 2011.

The population of children ages 0 to 6 is 109 which makes up 16.17% of the total population of the village. The average sex ratio is 909 which is lower than the Bihar state average of 918. The child sex ratio as per the census is 912, lower than the Bihar average of 935. The size of the area is about 5.45 square kilometer.

== Education ==
Akauna village has a higher literacy rate compared to Bihar. In 2011, the literacy rate of Akauna village was 80.00% compared to 61.80% for Bihar. Male literacy was at 85.81% while female literacy was 73.61%. The Village has one Primary and one Middle School.

== Income sources ==
Out of the total population of Akauna, 234 people were engaged in work activities. Of these workers, 43.16% described their work as lasting more than six months, while 56.84% described their work as lasting less than six months. Of the workers engaged in work lasting longer than six months, 4 were agricultural laborers and 77 were owners of land that they farmed.
