= Harnahi =

Village in Bihar, India

Harnahi is a village in Bihar, India under Aurangabad District.
