= Akorhi =

- village
- Country: India
- State: Bihar
- District: Aurangabad

Population (2011)
  - Total: 257

Languages
  - Official: Hindi
- Time zone: UTC+5:30 (IST)

Akorhi is a village in Aurangabad district in the Indian state of Bihar.

== Population ==
The Akorhi village has population of 257 of which 126 are males while 131 are females as per Population Census 2011.

In Akorhi village population of children with age 0-6 is 64 which makes up 24.90% of total population of village. Average Sex Ratio of Akorhi village is 1040 which is higher than Bihar state average of 918. Child Sex Ratio for the Akorhi as per census is 939, higher than Bihar average of 935.

== Education ==
Akorhi village has lower literacy rate compared to Bihar. In 2011, literacy rate of Akorhi village was 55.44% compared to 61.80% of Bihar. In Akorhi Male literacy stands at 70.97% while female literacy rate was 41.00%.

== Work Profile ==
In Akorhi village out of total population, 120 were engaged in work activities. A total of 12.50% of workers describe their work as Main Work (Employment or Earning more than six months) while 87.50% were involved in Marginal activity providing livelihood for less than six months. Of 120 workers engaged in Main Work, 9 were cultivators (owner or co-owner) while 2 were Agricultural labourer.
