= At, Bihar =

At is a village in Aurangabad, Bihar, India. It is in the Madanpur tehsil. It has one primary school. It is situated on the bank of Keshar river. Farming is the only source of income for villagers. It is connected with a singled lane road.
