= Dariyapur, Aurangabad =

Village in Bihar, India

Coordinates: 24.92413°N 84.68790°E

Dariyapur is a village in the Aurangabad district Indian state of Bihar. It comes under Dumri panchayat, Kutumba block.

Many Dariyapur residents are Rajputs of the Kalachuri clan. The nearest market is Baluganj Bazaar. Hariharganj Block is also near to the village. The village is completely electrified and has a primary school. The Devi Mandap and New Shiva temples are located in the centre of Dariyapur.

Agriculture is the major industry in Dariyapur. Many village youths serve in the Indian Armed Forces.
