= Panrepur =

- village
- Country: India
- State: Bihar
- District: Aurangabad

Population (2011)
  - Total: 257

Languages
  - Official: Hindi
- Time zone: UTC+5:30 (IST)

Panrepur is a village in Aurangabad district in the Indian state of Bihar.
