= Amauna (Nabinagar), Aurangabad =

Amauna
- village
- Country: India
- State: Bihar
- District: Aurangabad

Population (2011)
  - Total: 225

Languages
  - Official: Hindi
- Time zone: UTC+5:30 (IST)

Amauna is a village located in the Nabinagar Block of Aurangabad district in the Indian state of Bihar.
