= Achuki, Aurangabad, Bihar =

Achuki
- Village
- Interactive map of Achuki
- Coordinates: 24.8838°N 84.5550°E
- Country: India
- State: Bihar
- district: Aurangabad
- block: Rafiganj

Population (2011)
  - Total: 1,781

Achuki is a village located in Rafiganj block, Aurangabad district, Bihar, India.

== Population ==
Achuki has a total of 259 houses in it. The Achuki village has population of 1781 of which 885 are males and 896 are females as per the Population Census of 2011.

The population of children ages 0 to 6 is 347 which makes up 19.48% of the total population of the village. The average sex ratio is 1012 which is higher than the Bihar state average of 918. The child sex ratio as per the census is 1053, higher than the Bihar average of 935.

== Education ==
Achuki village has a lower literacy rate compared to Bihar. In 2011, the literacy rate of Achuki village was 59.41% compared to 61.80% for Bihar. Male literacy was at 73.18% while female literacy was 45.68%.

== Income sources ==
Out of the total population of Achuki, 818 people were engaged in work activities. Of these workers, 85.09% described their work as lasting more than six months, while 14.91% described their work as lasting less than six months. Of the workers engaged in work lasting longer than six months, 276 were agricultural laborers and 328 were owners of land that they farmed.
