= Raghunathpur, Aurangabad =

Raghunathpur
- Village
- Location in Bihar, India Raghunathpur (India)
- Coordinates: 25.03°N 84.4°E
- Country: India
- State: Bihar
- District: Aurangabad
- Named for: Raghunath Srivastawa.

Government
  - Type: Village
- Elevation: 84 m (276 ft)

Population (2011)
  - Total: 2,404

Languages
  - Official: Hindi, English, Urdu and Magahi
- Time zone: UTC+5:30 (IST)
- Postal code: 824120
- ISO 3166 code: IN-BR

Raghunathpur is a village, which is located in Haspura block of Aurangabad District, Bihar in India. It is the largest village of the Purhara Panchayat and belongs to Magadh division. It is 50 km north of the district headquarters Aurangabad, and 98 km from state capital Patna.

The total area of village is 178 hectares and the population is 2,883 people. There are about 515 houses in Raghunathpur village. Daudnagar is the nearest town, approximately 30 km away.
