= Anjanian =

Village in Aurangabad (Bihar), India

- village
- Country: India
- State: Bihar
- District: Aurangabad

Population (2011)
  - Total: 1,148

Languages
  - Official: Hindi
- Time zone: UTC+5:30 (IST)

Anjanian is a village in Deo, Bihar, Aurangabad district in the Indian state of Bihar.

== Population ==
The Anjanian village has population of 850 of which 458 are males while 392 are females as per Population Census 2011.

In Anjanian village population of children with age 0-6 is 158 which makes up 18.59% of total population of village. Average Sex Ratio of Anjanian village is 856 which is lower than Bihar state average of 918. Child Sex Ratio for the Anjanian as per census is 756, lower than Bihar average of 935.

== Education ==
Anjanian village has higher literacy rate compared to Bihar. In 2011, literacy rate of Anjanian village was 84.54% compared to 61.80% of Bihar. In Anjanian Male literacy stands at 91.85% while female literacy rate was 76.23

== Work Profile ==
In Anjanian village out of total population, 356 were engaged in work activities. 98.60% of workers describe their work as Main Work (Employment or Earning more than 6 Months) while 1.40% were involved in Marginal activity providing livelihood for less than 6 months. Of 356 workers engaged in Main Work, 92 were cultivators (owner or co-owner) while 233 were Agricultural labourer.
