= Nahro Dehri =

Village in Bihar, India

Coordinates: 24°57′N 84°26′E

Nahro Dehri is a village in Aurangabad district, Bihar, India, with a population of 300. Nahro Dehri is located 30 kilometres north from Aurangabad, the district city of Bihar; 20 Kilometres north from Anugrah Narayan Road Railway station; and 5.5 Kilometres east from NH-98.

Residents are mostly Hindus of the Rajput caste. The main languages are Hindi and Magadhi.

== Education ==
95% people of this village are well educated. This village has a private school named Shri Tridandi Dev Vidya Niketan and a government primary school.
