= Gangti =

Gangati is a village situated in Goh of Aurangabad district in the Indian state of Bihar. As of 2011 Census, population of the village is 721 with 354 males and 367 females. Total number of families residing in the village is 126. The population of the village is with total 126 families residing.
