= Bhalu Khaira =

- Village
- Location within Bihar Location within India
- Coordinates: 24°48′38″N 84°34′56″E
- Country: India
- State: Bihar
- District: Aurangabad
- Established: 1885
- Founder: Mohammad Iqrazul khan
- Named for: Bhalu Khaira

Government
  - Body: Mla
- Elevation: 89 m (292 ft)

Population (2011)
  - Total: 1,833
- Time zone: UTC+5:30 (IST)
- PIN: 824125

Bhalu Khaira is a village in Aurangabad district in the Indian state of Bihar.

== History ==
The village was founded by Mohammed Iqrajul Khan F/O Mohammad Abul Hassan Khan.

== Geography ==
Bhalu Khaira has a total area of 4.39 km^{2} (1.69 mi^{2}) Total distance: 8.39 km (5.21 mi).

== Demographics ==
As of the 2011 census of India Bhalu Khaira had a population of 1,833. Bhalu Khaira has an average literacy rate of 73.70%: male literacy is 81.50%, and female literacy is 64.51%.
