= Sinduriya =

Sinduriya is a village in Barun, Bihar, India.

More than 60 households compose the town's ethnic Rajput majority. Villagers have their own land in Sinduriya. The village hosts the Devi temple.

The population of Sinduriya is 545.
