= Aurangabad, Bihar =

Aurangabad
- City
- Location in Bihar, India
- Coordinates: 24.70°N 84.35°E
- Country: India
- State: Bihar
- District: Aurangabad
- Established: 26-January-1973
- Named for: Emperor Aurangzeb

Area
  - Total: 141.7 km^{2} (54.7 sq mi)
- Elevation: 108 m (354 ft)

Population (2011)
  - Total: 102,244
  - Density: 721.6/km^{2} (1,869/sq mi)
- Demonym: Aurangabadi
- Time zone: UTC+5:30 (IST)
- PIN: 824101,824102 (Aurangabad)
- Telephone code: 06186
- ISO 3166 code: IN-BR
- Vehicle registration: BR-26
- Sex ratio: 1000:910 ♂/♀
- Website: aurangabad.bih.nic.in

Aurangabad is a city in Aurangabad District, Bihar, India. It is the district's centre of governance and has a population of 102,244 as of 2011. The people of this region speak Magahi and Hindi.

== History ==
In ancient times, Aurangabad was located in the Mahajanapada kingdom of Magadh (1200 - 322 BCE). The ancient rulers of the town included Bimbisara (late 5th century BCE), Ajatashatru (early 4th century BCE), Chandragupta Maurya (321 - 298 BCE) and Ashoka (268 - 232 BCE).

During the rule of Sher Shah Suri (1486 - 1545 CE), Aurangabad became strategically important as part of the Rohtas Sirkar (district). After the death of Sher Shah Suri, Aurangabad fell under the rule of Akbar. The Afghan upsurge in the area was suppressed by Todar Mal. Some elements of Afghan architecture remain.

In 1865, Bihar District was separated from Patna District. Aurangabad was made a subdivision of Bihar district. Stement was the first subdivisional officer of Aurangabad subdivision. The first Member of Parliament from the district was the former Chief Minister of Unified Bihar, Satyendra Narayan Singh (Chhote Saheb).

On 26 January 1973, Aurangabad district, Bihar, was created (government notification number 07/11-2071-72 dated 19 January 1973). K. A. H. Subramanyam was the first district magistrate and Surjit Kumar Saha was the sub-divisional officer.

== Geography ==
Aurangabad town is located in north east India on the NH 2 (now NH19 – Grand Trunk Road) at its crossing with NH98 (now NH139). Its nearest large town is Gaya, 70 kilometres (43 mi) to the east. The capital of Bihar, Patna is 140 kilometres (87 mi) to the north east.

The area of the town is 89 square kilometres (34 sq mi).

Aurangabad rests on alluvial plain on the bank of Adri river. The larger Son river is 26 kilometres (16 mi) to the west. Other rivers such as the Punpun, Auranga, Bataane, Morhar, and Madaar also flow through Aurangabad district.

== Economy ==
Aurangabad has an agrarian economy along with some industries. It lies in a drought-prone area. The main crops are rice, wheat, gram lentil and rapeseed. With rapid industrialisation, Aurangabad has secured 4th position in most improved districts by Niti Aayog. It mainly includes heavy electricity production industries like Nabinagar Super Thermal Power Plant which has a capacity of 4380 MW(660MWX6). It is one of the third largest power plants in India. On 6 September 2019, the power plant commissioned the first 660 MW unit of 4380 MW. (NTPC, Nabinagar) and Cement Production (Shree Cement). Manufactured products include carpets, blankets and brassware. Auranagabad is also famous for strawberry cultivation which helps local farmers to boost their economy and generates jobs for the villagers, who no longer need to migrate in search of livelihood.

== Demographics ==
As of 2011 India census, Aurangabad had a population of 102,244.

Religions in Aurangabad City
1. Hinduism (75.3%)
2. Islam (24.2%)
3. Others (0.51%)

== Religious sites ==
- Dev Surya Temple
- Patalganga Math
- Gajana Dham
- Kalpavriksha Dham
- Devkund Math
- Digambar Jain Mandir
- Satbahini Mandir
- Sayachandi Dham
- Umaga Sun Temple

== Notable people ==
- Anugrah Narayan Sinha, Member Constituent Assembly of India and first Deputy Chief Minister of Bihar
- Satyendra Narayan Sinha, first Member of parliament and former Chief Minister of Bihar
- Shankar Dayal Singh, Author and Member of Parliament Lok Sabha 1971-77 / Rajya Sabha 1990-95
- Nikhil Kumar, former MP and former Governor of Kerala
- Sushil Kumar Singh, Member of the Parliament of India from Bharatiya janata party .

== See also ==
- Daudnagar Town
- Rafiganj
- Deo, Bihar
- Obra
- Nabinagar
- Kutumba
