= Amauna, Araria =

Amauna
- Village
- Location in India
- Coordinates: 26°21′29″N 87°14′17″E
- Country: India
- State: Bihar
- Region: Mithila
- District: Araria

Population (2011)
  - Total: 5,502

Languages
  - Regional: Maithili
- Time zone: UTC+5:30 (IST)

Amauna is a village located in the Forbesganj Block of Araria district in the Indian state of Bihar.
