= Obra, Bihar =

Obra
- Town
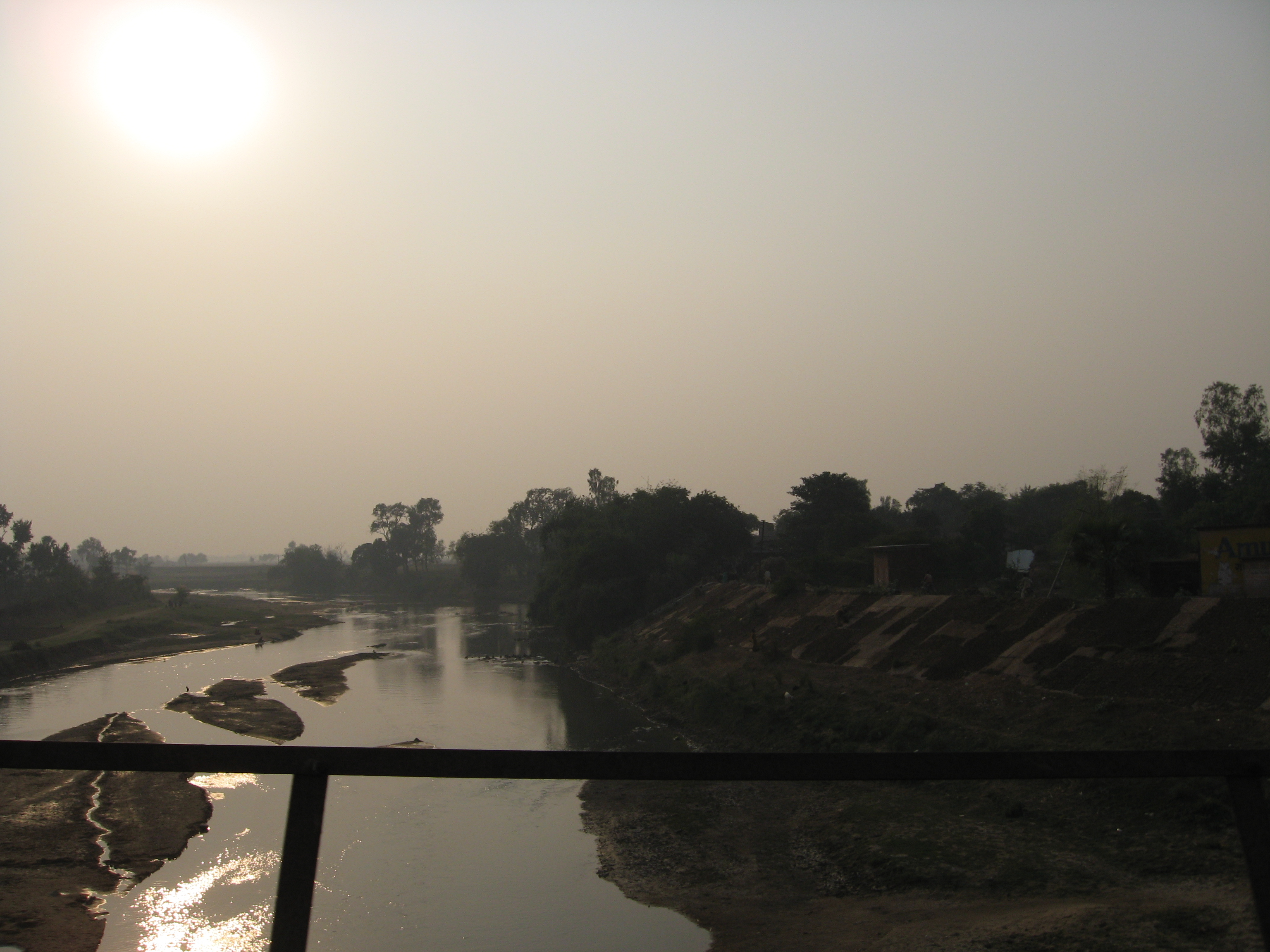
- Punpun River

- Location in Bihar, India
- Coordinates: 24.87°N 84.34°E
- Country: India
- State: Bihar
- District: Auranagabd

Area
  - Total: 24 km^{2} (9.3 sq mi)
- Elevation: 99 m (325 ft)

Population (2011)
  - Total: 14,786
  - Density: 620/km^{2} (1,600/sq mi)

Languages
  - Official: Magahi, Hindi
- Time zone: UTC+5:30 (IST)
- PIN: 824124
- Telephone code: 91-6328
- ISO 3166 code: IN-BR
- Vehicle registration: BR-26-?
- Website: aurangabad.bih.nic.in

Obra is a small town 15 km away from the district headquarters on NH-139 (Patna-Aurangabad). As of 2018, Obra has a population of 14,786. In the Obra block, there are 20 Panchayats each with an average of 6 villages. The geographic block is demarcated in the east and south by Daudnagar, Rafiganj, Aurangabad and in the west by Rohtas district. Situated on the confluence of the Punpun and Adri rivers, the rolling topography of the town is typical, spread on the plain of the Son river bed, known for its very fertile land.

== Geography ==
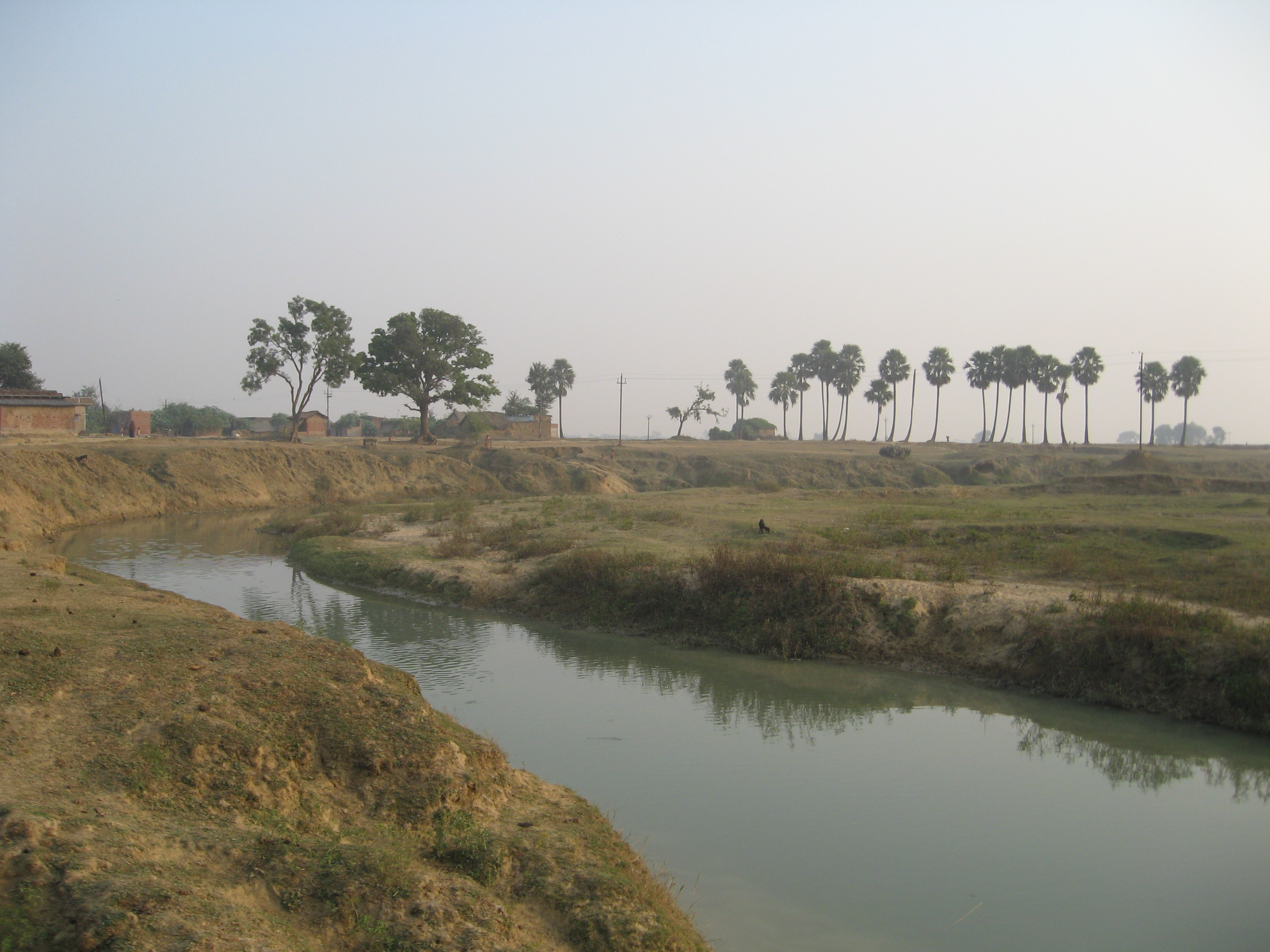
Adri River

Obra is located in the eastern part of India at 24.87°N 84.34°E. The town is surrounded by three rivers: Punpun which flows from the western and northern part, the Adri River which crosses the eastern areas near the village Deokali, as well as the Son river which flows through the west of this geographic area. Obra is situated 114 km from the capital city of Bihar, Patna. Obra is situated in the plain of the Son river, which is responsible for making the surrounding land very fertile. Obra is not far from the Ratan hillock of the Magadh range and the Chhotanagpur plateau of Palamu (in the Jharkhand state).

== Population ==
As of 2018 Obra has a population of 7,846 males and 6,940 females.

== Economy ==
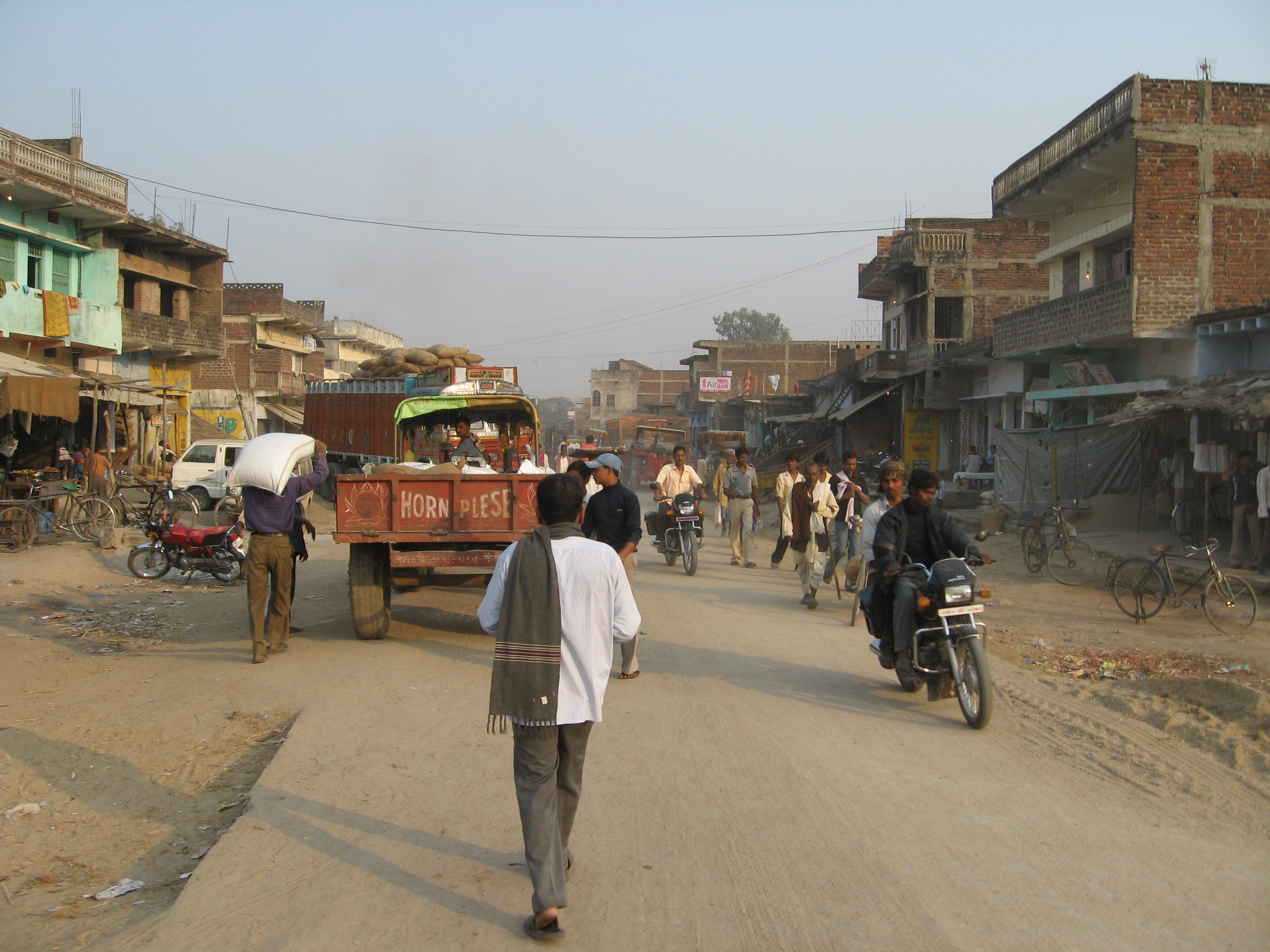
Obra Gola road

The economy of Obra is mainly dependent on agriculture and sesame farming (Til ka tel). The vast tracts of fertile land in the region support the economic output of Obra. It is recognized as the rice bowl of Magadh region which trades with all parts of Bihar and Jharkhand. It is also well known for the production of Kaleen (carpets). The tradition of weaving beautiful and unique carpets in the town dates back to the 15th century. The Kambal (blanket) industry in Obra is supported by the government. A processing plant for raw blanket has been established in Obra for 50 years, and the trade of kambals dates back 100 years. These sectors give employment to more than 1000 people.
