= Amauna (Barun), Aurangabad =

Amauna
- village
- Country: India
- State: Bihar
- District: Aurangabad

Population (2011)
  - Total: 1,811

Languages
  - Official: Hindi
- Time zone: UTC+5:30 (IST)

Amauna is a village located in the Belain Panchayat of Navinagar block of Aurangabad district of Bihar. It has population of around 300 People. The nearest city from this village is Navinagar around 8 km. The district headquarter Aurangabad is approx 30 km away from this village.

== Population ==
The Amauna village has population of 1811 of which 950 are males while 861 are females as per Population Census 2011.

In Amauna village population of children with age 0-6 is 278 which makes up 15.35% of total population of village. Average Sex Ratio of Amauna village is 906 which is lower than Bihar state average of 918. Child Sex Ratio for the Amauna as per census is 805, lower than Bihar average of 935.

== Education ==
In 2011, literacy rate of Amauna village was 68.10% compared to 61.80% of Bihar. In Amauna Male literacy stands at 78.02% while female literacy rate was 57.39%.

== Work Profile ==
In Amauna village out of total population, 590 were engaged in work activities. 46.78% of workers describe their work as Main Work (Employment or Earning more than 6 Months) while 53.22% were involved in Marginal activity providing livelihood for less than 6 months. Of 590 workers engaged in Main Work, 216 were cultivators (owner or co-owner) while 9 were Agricultural labourer.
