= Sanri =

Sanri Tilaiya
- Census Town
- Location in Jharkhand, India Sanri (India)
- Coordinates: 23.7042°N 85.4972°E
- Country: India
- State: Jharkhand
- District: Ramgarh

Area
  - Total: 8.442 km^{2} (3.259 sq mi)

Population (2011)
  - Total: 6,186
  - Density: 732.8/km^{2} (1,898/sq mi)

Languages (*For language details see Mandu (community development block)#Language and religion)
  - Official: Hindi, Urdu
- Time zone: UTC+5:30 (IST)
- PIN: 829150
- Telephone/ STD code: 06545
- Vehicle registration: JH
- Lok Sabha constituency: Hazaribagh
- Vidhan Sabha constituency: Mandu
- Website: ramgarh.nic.in

Sanri (also referred to as Tilaiya) is a census town in the Mandu CD block in the Ramgarh subdivision of the Ramgarh district in the Indian state of Jharkhand.

== Geography ==
Cities, towns and locations in Ramgarh district in North Chotanagpur Division
M: municipality, CT: census town, R: rural/ urban centre, T: tourist centre, P: power plant
Abbreviation used- TPP: thermal power project
Owing to space constraints in the small map, the actual locations in a larger map may vary slightly

=== Location ===
Sanri, alias Tilaiya, is located at 23.7042°N 85.4972°E.

=== Area overview ===
The map alongside provides links to five operational areas of Central Coalfields spread across South Karanpura Coalfield, Ramgarh Coalfield and West Bokaro Coalfield. Four of the six CD blocks in the district have coal mines – Patratu, Ramgarh, Mandu and Chitarpur. The high concentration of census towns in these blocks are noticeable on the map. Only two blocks, Gola and Dulmi, are rural areas. Ramgarh district lies in the central part of the Chota Nagpur Plateau and has a coal-mining sector. The Damodar valley covers most of the district. The forested areas in highlands to the north and the south of the valley can be seen in the map (marked in the shaded areas). "Chotanagpur has a charm of its own... The entire area forms one of the most charming series of views imaginable. The far-off hills in the background in exquisite tints of blue or purple as the light falls, the nearer hills picturesquely shaped and luxuriant in every shade of green with their bold escarpments in black or grey, and the brown plains below furnishing their quota of colours."

Note: The map alongside presents some of the notable locations in the district. All places marked in the map are linked in the larger full screen map.

== Demographics ==
According to the 2011 Census of India, Sanri had a total population of 6,186, of which 3,216 (52%) were males and 2,970 (48%) were females. Population in the age range 0-6 years was 891. The total number of literate persons in Sanri was 3,910 (73.84% of the population over 6 years).

== Infrastructure ==
According to the District Census Handbook 2011, Ramgarh, Sanri, alias Tilaiya, covered an area of 8.442 km^{2}. Among the civic amenities, it had 2 km roads with open drains, and the protected watersupply involved a hand pump and an uncovered well. It had 1,097 domestic electric connections. Among the medical facilities, it had 1 hospital, 1 dispensary, 1 health centre, 4 family welfare centres, 7 maternity and child welfare centres, 9 maternity homes, 3 nursing homes, and 2 medicine shops. Among the educational facilities it had 7 primary schools, 1 middle school, and 1 senior secondary school. It had 4 non-formal educational centres (Sarva Siksha Abhiyan). Two important commodities it produced were coal and chuna pathar.

== Transport ==
There is a station nearby at Kuju on the Koderma–Hazaribagh–Barkakana–Ranchi line.

Sanri is off National Highway 20.
