= Umga Sun Temple =

Sun Temples In Bihar

- Umga Surya Mandir, Umangeswari Mandir
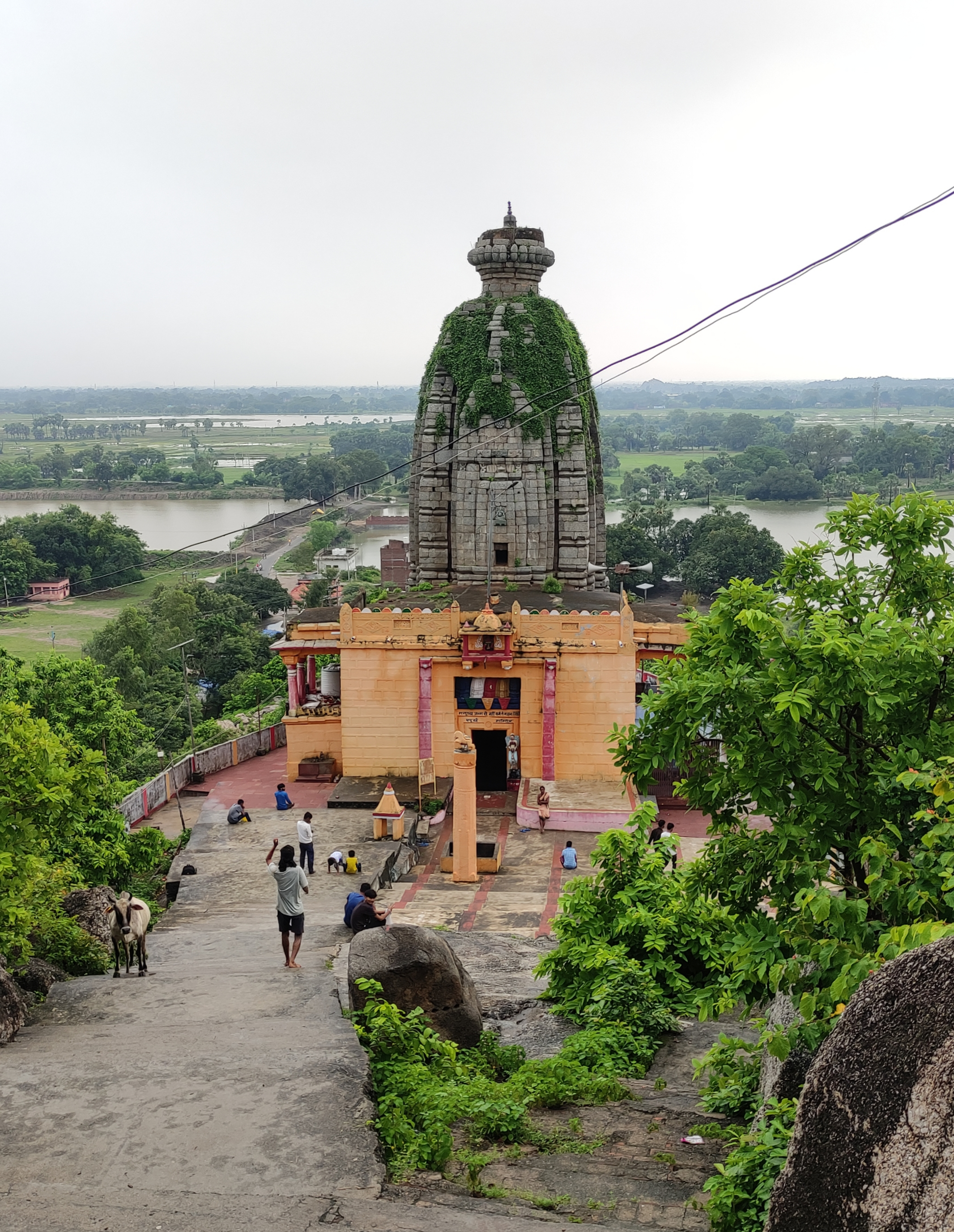
- Umangeswari Mandir, Madanpur, Aurangabad, Bihar

Religion
- Affiliation: Hinduism
- District: Aurangabad district, Bihar
- Festival: Chhath

Location
- Location: Madanpur, Bihar, India
- State: Bihar

Architecture
- Type: Mix of Nagri Architecture & Dravidian architecture

Umga Sun Temple also known as a Umga Surya Mandir is a Hindu temple in Madanpur, Aurangabad, Bihar. The temple is a Sun shrine, dedicated to Lord Sun for Chhath Puja. The temple is located in Madanpur, Aurangabad in the Indian State of Bihar. Umga Sun Temple is situated on Umga hills, Umga hills famous as a tourist place in Aurangabad Bihar. According to religious belief, After Deo Sun Temple, Umga temple is second in important temples for Chhath Puja.

== See also ==
- Deo Sun Temple
- Deo Fort
- Deo Town
- Chhath Puja
