= Barun, Bihar =

Barun
- City
- Barun Bihar India
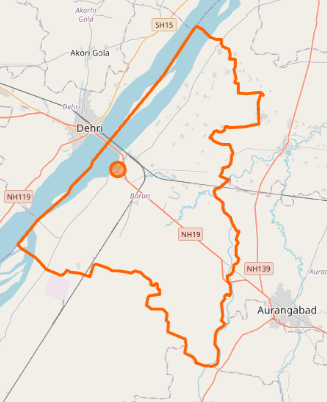

- Location within Bihar
- Country: India
- State: Bihar
- District: Aurangabad Bihar
- Block: Barun Block

Area
  - Total: 947 ha (2,340 acres)

Population
  - Total: 8,394
- Time zone: UTC+5:30 IST
- PIN Code: 824112
- ISO 3166 code: IN-BR

Barun is a small town in Barun Panchayat Block of Aurangabad district of Bihar, India.

Barun is located 133.7 km (83.1 mi) from Patna Junction station and 11.6 km (7.2 mi) from Aurangabad. The bridge No. 4 for crossing over the Son river is 2.5 km (1.6 mi) away and Dehri-on-sone across river is 5.4 km (3.4 mi) away.

The Pincode of Barun is 824112. Barun is located just 2 km (1.2 mi) away from Grand Trunk Road, which crosses over Sone River to Dehri.
