= Dhamni =

Dhamani
- Village
- Country: India
- State: Maharashtra
- District: Pune
- Tehsil: Ambegaon

Government
  - Body: Gram panchayat

Languages
  - Official: Marathi
  - Other spoken: Hindi
- Time zone: UTC+5:30 (IST)
- ISO 3166 code: IN-MH
- Vehicle registration: MH-14

Dhamani is a village in Ambegaon taluka of Pune District in the state of Maharashtra, India. The village is administrated by a Sarpanch who is an elected representative of village as per constitution of India and Panchayati raj (India).

== Geographical location and population ==
Dhamani is in Ambegaon Taluka, Pune District. The village covers an area of 1,393.71 hectares (3,443.9 acres) and according to the 2011 census, the village has 673 families and a total population of 3814. There are 1384 males and 1430 females. There are 181 Scheduled Castes and 42 Scheduled Tribes. The nearest town Manchar is at a distance of 32 km (20 mi). The census index of this village is 55551.

== Literacy ==
- Total literate population: 2075 (73.74%)
- Literate male population: 1139 (82.3%)
- Literate female population: 936 (65.45%)

== Educational Facility ==
- The village has 1 government pre-primary school.
- There is one government district primary school in the village.
- There is 1 Government Higher Secondary and Secondary School in the village.
- The nearest degree college (Pabal) is more than 10 kilometers away.
- The nearest College of Engineering (Avsari) is more than 10 kilometers away.
- The nearest medical college (Pune) is more than 10 km away.
- The nearest management institute (Pune) is at a distance of more than 10 km.
- The nearest polytechnic is located at a distance of more than 10 km.
- The nearest Vocational Training School (Ghodegaon) is more than 10 km away.
- The nearest Informal Training Center (Pune) is more than 10 km away.
- The nearest special school for the disabled (Pabal) is more than 10 km away.
- The village has 1 other private educational facility.

== Medical Facility (Government) ==
There is 1 government hospital center in the village.

The nearest community health center is more than 15 kilometers away. The village has 1 Primary Health Center. The nearest primary health sub-center is more than 15 km away. The village has 1 Maternity and Child Welfare Center at Manchar. The nearest Alternative Medicine Hospital is more than 10 km away. There is 1 hospital in the village. The nearest veterinary hospital There is 1 family welfare center in the village.

== Hygiene ==
There is no sewerage system in the village. The village has open sewerage system. Sewage is discharged directly into water bodies. The entire area is involved in a clean-up operation. There is no public toilet in the village with bathroom.
