= Kalpavriksha Dham =

Kalpavriksha Dham is a Hindu monastery in Bihar, India

Shree Krishnapuri Kalpavriksha Dham
- श्री कृष्णपुरी कल्पवृक्ष धाम
- Interactive map of Shree Krishnapuri Kalpavriksha Dham

Monastery information
- Other name: श्री कृष्णपुरी ठाकुरबाड़ी
- Established: 90 Years Ago
- Dedication: Kalpavriksha
- Celebration: Kartik Purnima

People
- Abbot: Dasharath Das Naga

Site
- Location: Kishunpur, Kutumba, Aurangabad, Bihar
- Country: India
- Coordinates: 24.5728229°N 84.2967507°E
- Public access: Yes
- Other information: The kalpavriksha is irrigated with milk.

Kalpavriksha Dham, also known as Shree Krishnapuri Kalpavriksha Dham, and Shree Krishnapuri Thakurbadi, is a Hindu monastery in Bihar, India.

== Geography ==
The monastery stands on the east bank of the Batane River at Kishunpur village, in the Kutumba administrative block of Aurangabad district. It lies at the eastern edge of Kishunpur, close to the neighbouring village of Parta, and is therefore also known as Shree Kalpavriksha Dham, Parta.

== History ==
According to Dasharath Das Naga, the chief priest of the temples, Munshi Shyam Das of the Bengali Estate made a vow beneath the Kalpavriksha tree. After the wish was fulfilled, the estate built a temple dedicated to Rama, Sita and Lakshmana, about 90 years before 2024.

The name of former abbot before Dasharath Das Naga is Nagendra Dash. One previous abbot was Hareram Brahamchari. He is noted for his diet cow dung as food.

== Temples ==
The monastery is named after the Kalpavriksha tree, which draws most of its visitors. The site also contains older temples to Sita, Rama and Lakshmana, Radha Krishna, Shiva and Durga.

== Events ==
The Suthania Mela, a local fair, is held annually on Kartik Purnima, the full moon day of the Hindu month of Kartik. The fair is also known as Kishunpur mela.

The Kalpavriksha Mahotsav, a three-day cultural festival, takes place during the fair; religious music, local classical dance, prayers and a communal feast are its main components.
