= Gajana Dham =

- गजना धाम
- Interactive map of Gajana Dham

Monastery information
- Dedication: Gajana Mata
- Celebration: Gajna Mahotsav

People
- Abbot: Awadh Bihari Das

Site
- Location: Nabinagar, Aurangabad, Bihar
- Country: India
- Coordinates: 24.505962°N 84.0895448°E
- Public access: Yes

Gajana Dham is a Hindu temple and a pilgrimage site for the entire region, covering the surrounding areas of Bihar and Jharkhand.

== Location ==
Gajana Dham is located on the bank of Karbar River in Nabinagar Block under Tandawa police station of Aurangabad district in Bihar, near the Jharkhand border.

== History ==
Although the temple is very old, it was renovated by Jagannath Singh alias Tyagi 60 years back in 1965.

According to local lore, it was the habitats of early men. The remains of old idols can be seen in the near by villages. The area was the capital of Kharwar Kings 800 years back. The region was under the control of Bengal's administrator Rampal Sen in 1200 AD, thereafter in Gadhwal's administrators..

== Daily Rituals ==
The goddess is daily awakened and performed ablutions & adornments. She is offered the pan cakes of 1.5kg of wheat flour cooked with 250gms on clarified butter in earthen pots.

== Recognition ==
The temple is recognized as a Shakti Peeth.

== Events ==
Gajana Mahotsav: An annual festival called Gajana Mahotsav is organized each year in the Chaitra month of Hindu calendar.

There is a large crowd of devotees on the special worship and Ramleela occasions during navratri.
