= Magadh division =

Administrative division in Bihar, India

- Division of Bihar
- Location of Magadh division in Bihar
- Coordinates: 24°45′N 85°00′E
- Country: India
- State: Bihar
- Region: Magadh
- Headquarters: Gaya
- Districts: Gaya, Nawada, Aurangabad, Jehanabad, Arwal

Government
  - Commissioner: Prem singh meena, IAS

Population (2011)
  - Total: 10,931,018

Magadh division is an administrative geographical unit of Bihar state of India. Gaya is the administrative headquarters of the division. Currently (2005), the division consists Gaya district, Nawada district, Aurangabad district, Jehanabad district, and Arwal district. The current divisional commissioner is Prem Singh Meena, an IAS officer of batch 2000 of Bihar cadre. Magadh is home to the Magahi culture. People speak Magahi language here.

== Districts, Sub-divisions, and Blocks ==
Magadh Division (HQ: Gaya) 5 District, 10 Subdivisions, and 61 Blocks
#	District	Headquarter	Subdivisions	#Blocks	Ref
1	Gaya	Gaya	Sadar; Sherghati; Tekari; Nimchak Bathani	24	
2	Aurangabad	Aurangabad	Auranagabad; Daudnagar	11	
3	Nawada	Nawada	Nawada; Rajauli	14	
4	Jehanabad	Jehanabad	Jehanabad	7	
5	Arwal	Arwal	Arwal	5	

== See also ==
- Divisions of Bihar
- Districts of Bihar
