= Patalganga Math =

- पातालगंगा मठ
- Interactive map of Patalganga Math

Monastery information
- Other name: Patalganga Dham
- Established: 300 Years ago
- Celebration: Patalganga Mahotsav

People
- Founder: Gyaninand Brahmachari
- Abbot: Adityanath Brahmachari

Site
- Location: Deo, Bihar, Aurangabad, Bihar
- Country: India
- Coordinates: 24.6514526°N 84.4216768°E
- Public access: Yes

Patalganga Math is a Hindu monastery and pilgrimage site. It is also known as Patalganga Dham.

== Geography ==
Patalganga Math is located in the Deo administrative block of Aurangabad district of Bihar.

== History ==
The monastery is more than 300 years old. It was founded by Baba Gyaninand Brahmachari. The math was constructed by Bhishma Dev Narayan Singh.

According to local lore, Baba Gyaninand Brahmachari from Naimisaranya once visited the temple Dev Surya Mandir with his disciples. During his tour, they travelled through the area. When he was tired, he decided to halt and sent his pupils to bring water.

During the search of his pupils for water, they met some shephereds. The shephereds taunted them saying that their precepter was highly noted for divine power and knowledge, therefore why he didn't make use of it.

The pupils returned and narrated the story to the Baba Gyaninand Brahmachari. The monk then reciting his spells, invoked mother Ganga and hit the land with his tongs causing water to appear. Thereafter the place was named Patalganga meaning underground Ganga as the water came from beneath the earth.

== Famous ==
Brahm Kund: It is a square-shaped pond.

Banjhan Kund: It is a triangular pond. According to the local lore, the devotees without children get descendants upon bathing in the pond.

== Events ==
Fair: An annual fair is organized each year on Kartik Purnima.

Patalganga Mahotsav: The devotees and local organize a festive called Patalganga Mahotsav each year on 13rd and 14th November.
