= Haspura, Aurangabad =

Haspura Hanspura
- Town
- Location in Bihar, India Haspura (India)
- Coordinates: 24.839°N 84.854°E
- Country: India
- State: Bihar
- District: Aurangabad

Government
  - Type: Municipality
- Elevation: 93 m (305 ft)

Population (2011)
  - Total: 7,940

Languages
  - Official: Hindi English Urdu Magahi
- Time zone: UTC+5:30 (IST)
- Postal code: 824120
- Vehicle registration: BR-26 H

Haspura (old name Hanspura), is a block and town of Aurangabad district of Bihar, state in India.

Religions in Haspura
1. Hindus (75.6%)
2. Muslims (23.8%)
3. Others (0.64%)
