= Nabinagar =

- city
- Location in Bihar, India
- Coordinates: 24.62°N 84.12°E
- Country: India
- State: Bihar
- District: Aurangabad
  - Rank: 4th
- Elevation: 138 m (453 ft)

Population (2011)
  - Total: 25,041

Languages
  - Official: Magadhi, Hindi, Urdu
- Time zone: UTC+5:30 (IST)
- Postal code: 824301
- Telephone code: 06186
- ISO 3166 code: IN-BR

Nabinagar, also known as Navinagar, is a city cum Nagar Panchayat in Aurangabad district in the Indian state of Bihar, and is the location of Navinagar Super Thermal Power Project.

== Geography ==
Navinagar is located at 24.62°N 84.12°E. Its average elevation is 138 metres (452 feet).

== Overview ==
Anugrah Narayan Sinha, the first Bihar Deputy Chief Minister and Finance Minister, was elected from the Nabinagar Assembly constituency.

Navinagar is slated to become a power hub since Bihar Government and NTPC are collaborating to set up a coal based thermal power plant, having three units of 660 MW each.

== Demographics ==
Religions in Navinagar
1. Hindus (97.7%)
2. Muslims (1.05%)
3. Others (0.46%)

As of 2001 India census, Navinagar had a population of 19,041. Males constitute 51% of the population and females 49%. Navinagar has an average literacy rate of 73%: male literacy is 70%, and female literacy is 63%. In Navinagar, 18% of the population is under 6 years of age.
