= Punpun River =

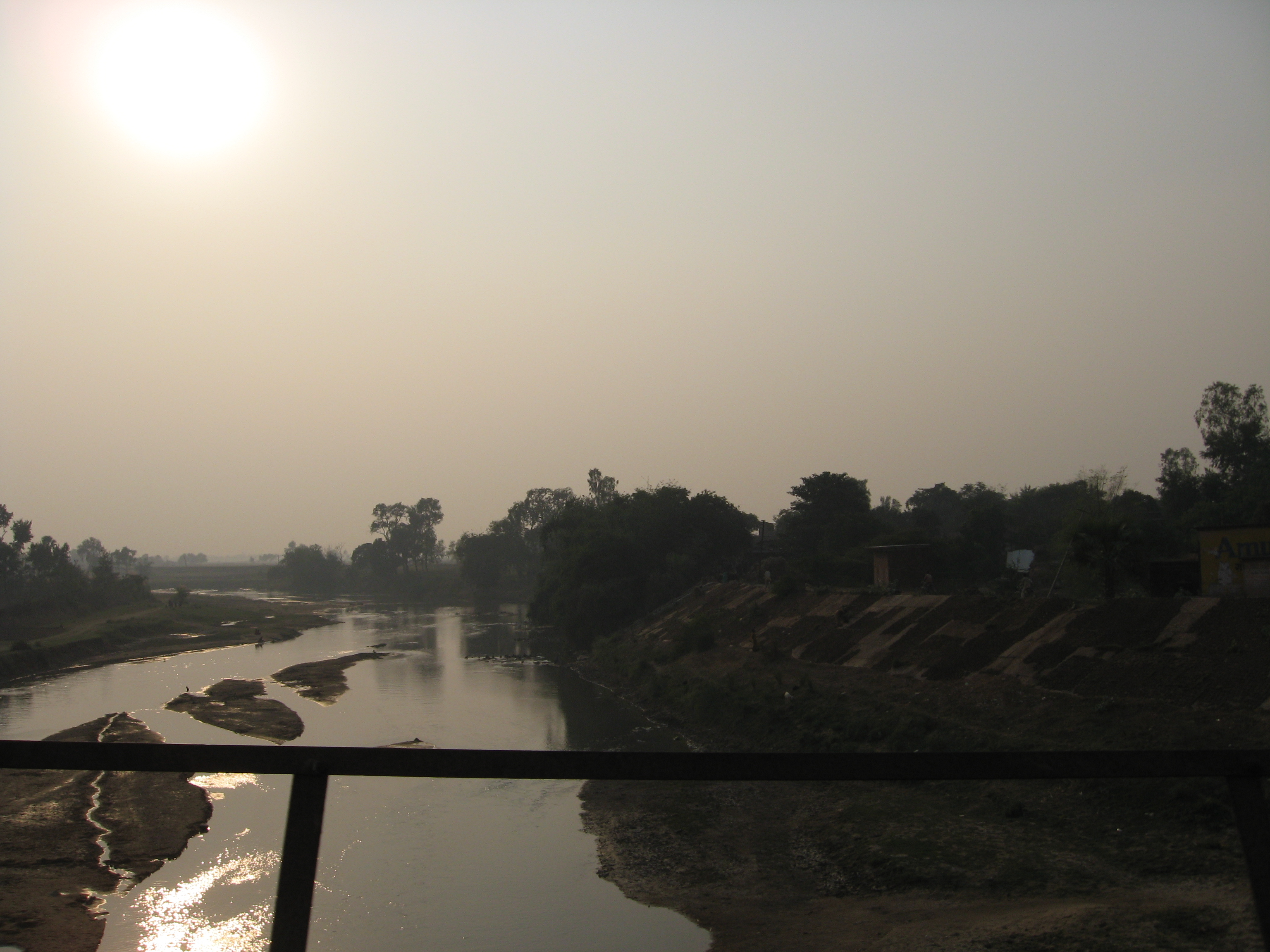
- Punpun at Obra, Aurangabad

Location
- Country: India
- State: Jharkhand, Bihar

Physical characteristics
- Source
  - location: Palamu district, Chota Nagpur Plateau, Jharkhand
  - coordinates: 24°11′N 84°9′E
  - elevation: 300 m (980 ft)
- Mouth: Ganges
  - location: Fatuha, Patna district, Bihar
  - coordinates: 25°30′50″N 85°17′46″E
  - elevation: 48–50 m (157–164 ft)
- Length: 200 km (120 mi)
- Basin size: 8,530 km^{2} (3,290 mi^{2})

The Punpun River is a tributary of the Ganges. It originates in Palamu district of Jharkhand and flows through Chatra, Gaya, Aurangabad, Jehanabad and Patna districts of the Indian states of Jharkhand and Bihar. Punpun is a place named after the Punpun river in Patna which is situated on the bank of Punpun river. On the bank of Punpun people celebrate Chhath Puja.

== Course ==
The Punpun originates on the Chota Nagpur Plateau, at an elevation of 300 metres (980 ft). From its source, the river flows predominantly in a north-easterly direction through Palamu and Chatra districts, Jharkhand, before entering Aurangabad district, Bihar.

In Bihar, the river traverses the districts of Gaya, Jehanabad, and Patna, draining a large part of south-central Bihar. The Punpun flows roughly parallel to the Sone River to the west before joining the Ganges at Fatuha, approximately 25 kilometres (16 mi) downstream of Patna.

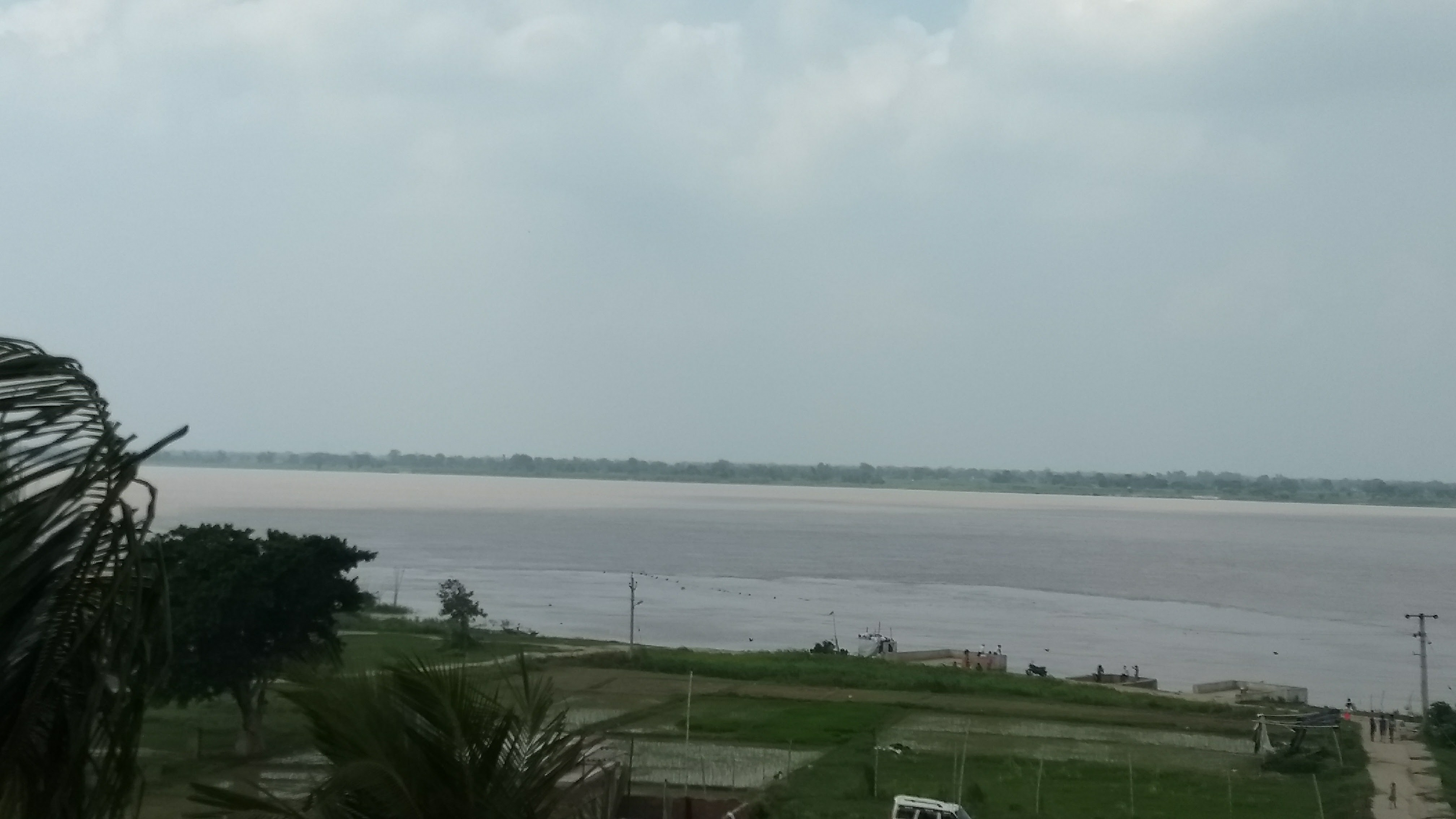
Confluence of the Punpun with the Ganges at Fatuha, Patna

=== Tributaries ===
The main tributaries of the Punpun are – the Butane, the Madar and the Mohar.

== Other features ==
The 200 kilometres (120 mi) long river is mostly rainfed and carries little water in the dry season. However, during rains, the Punpun often causes heavy flood damages east of Patna City. The catchment area of the Punpun is 8,530 square kilometres (3,290 sq mi). Agricultural area in the Punpun basin is about 5,000 square kilometres (1,900 sq mi). The average annual rainfall for the basin is 1,181 millimetres (46.5 in).

== Religious significance ==
The Punpun river is believed to have originated with the blessings of Brahma.

It is said in Garuda Purana that in ancient times, sages Sanak, Sanandan, Sanatan, Kapil and Panchshikh were performing severe penance in the Palamu forest of the southern part of Keekat (Magadh) state (present-day Jharkhand). Pleased with the penance, Brahma appeared. The sages searched for water to wash Brahma's feet. When they did not find water, the sages collected their sweat. When the sweat was kept in the kamandal, the kamandal would turn upside down. In this way, due to repeated turning of the kamandal, the word Punpuna(पुनः पुना) came out of Brahma's mouth involuntarily. After this, an endless stream of water came out from there. Due to this, the sages named it Punpuna(पुनः पुना), which is now famous as Punpun(पुनपुन ). At that time, Brahma had said that whoever performs Pind daan on the banks of this river will send his ancestors to heaven. Brahmaji had said about the Punpun river that ""पुनःपुना सर्व नदीषु पुण्या, सदावह स्वच्छ जला शुभ प्रदा". Since then, the tradition of offering the first pind daan on the banks of the Punpun river during Pitru Paksha has been going on for centuries.

According to the belief, before performing Shraddha Tarpan and Pind Daan of ancestors in the international religious city of Gaya, it is necessary to perform Pind Daan in Punpun river. Pind Daan in Gaya is considered complete only after performing Pind Daan in Punpun river.

There are many mythological stories of Punpun river ghat. In Garuda Purana, it is called Adi Ganga. It is said that Lord Rama had once come to this Punpun river ghat with Mata Janaki for the peace of the souls of his ancestors. He had first performed the offering of pind here. After which he went to Gaya and performed the complete offering of pind, due to which it is considered the first door of Moksha Daayini.

However, facilities like those in Gaya are not available anywhere on the ghats of the Punpun river. This is the reason why people from outside come directly to Gaya. In Gaya, when the devotees talk to the local Pandits and priests about the first Pind Daan in the Punpun river, they get them the first Pind Daan in the Godavari Sarovar through supplementary rituals, saying that offering Pind Daan in this lake is as fruitful as in Punpun.
