= Rafiganj, Bihar =

Rafiganj
- Town
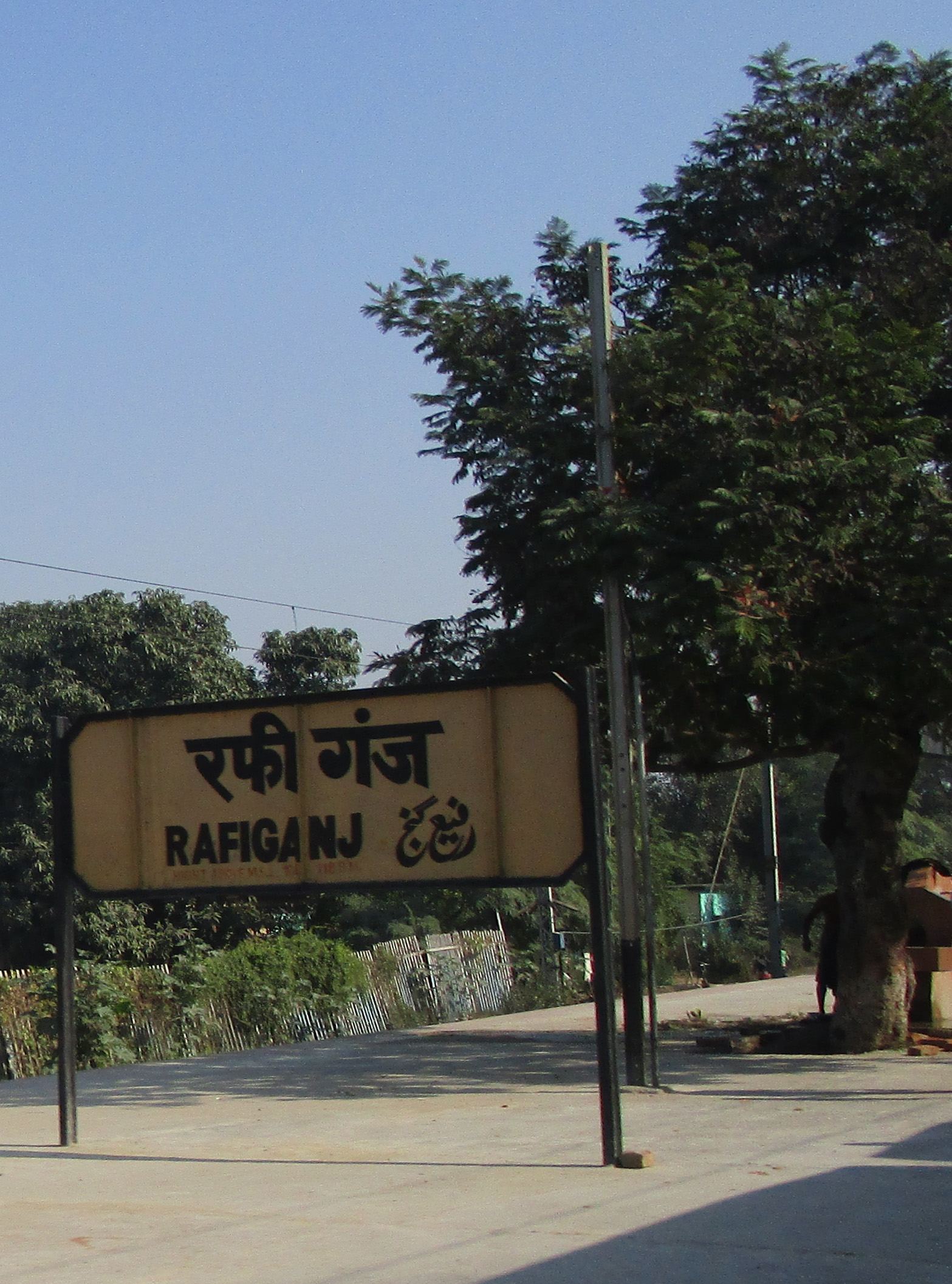
- Rafiganj railway station nameplate

- Location in Bihar, India
- Coordinates: 24.82°N 84.65°E
- Country: India
- State: Bihar
- Division: Magadh
- District: Aurangabad
- Established: 1889
- Named for: Rafiganj

Government
  - Type: Nagar Panchayat
  - Body: Rafiganj Nagar Panchayat

Area
  - Total: 18 km^{2} (6.9 sq mi)
  - Rank: 2
- Elevation: 10,000 m (33,000 ft)

Population (2011)
  - Total: 35,536
  - Density: 2,000/km^{2} (5,100/sq mi)
- Time zone: UTC+5:30 (IST)
- PIN: 824125

Rafiganj is a town and a notified area in Aurangabad district in the Indian state of Bihar. It is the district's second-largest town in terms of population after Aurangabad. Rafiganj is located 25 kilometres away from Aurangabad and 36 kilometres from Gaya.

== Geography ==
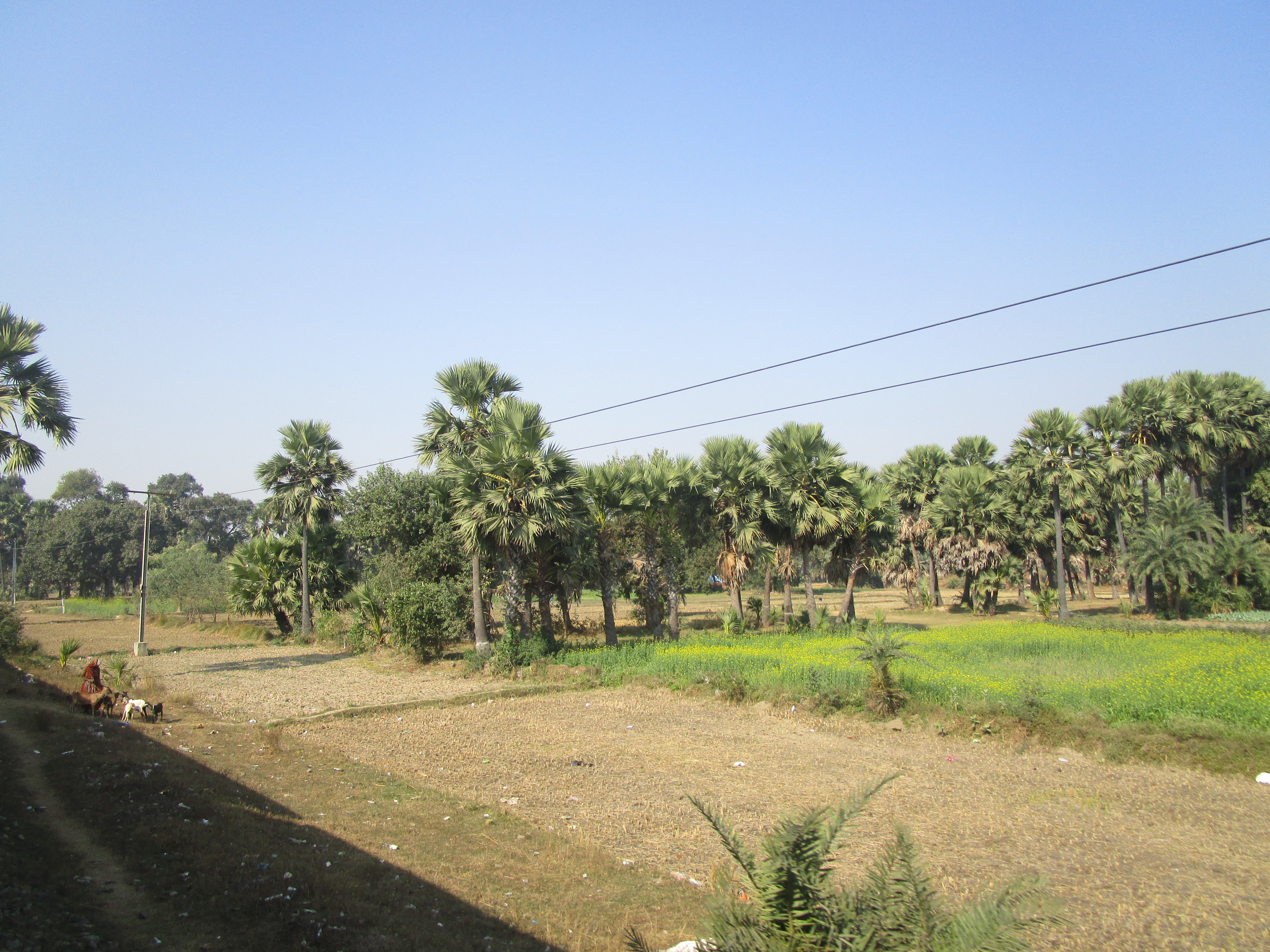
Asian palmyra palm in Rafiganj

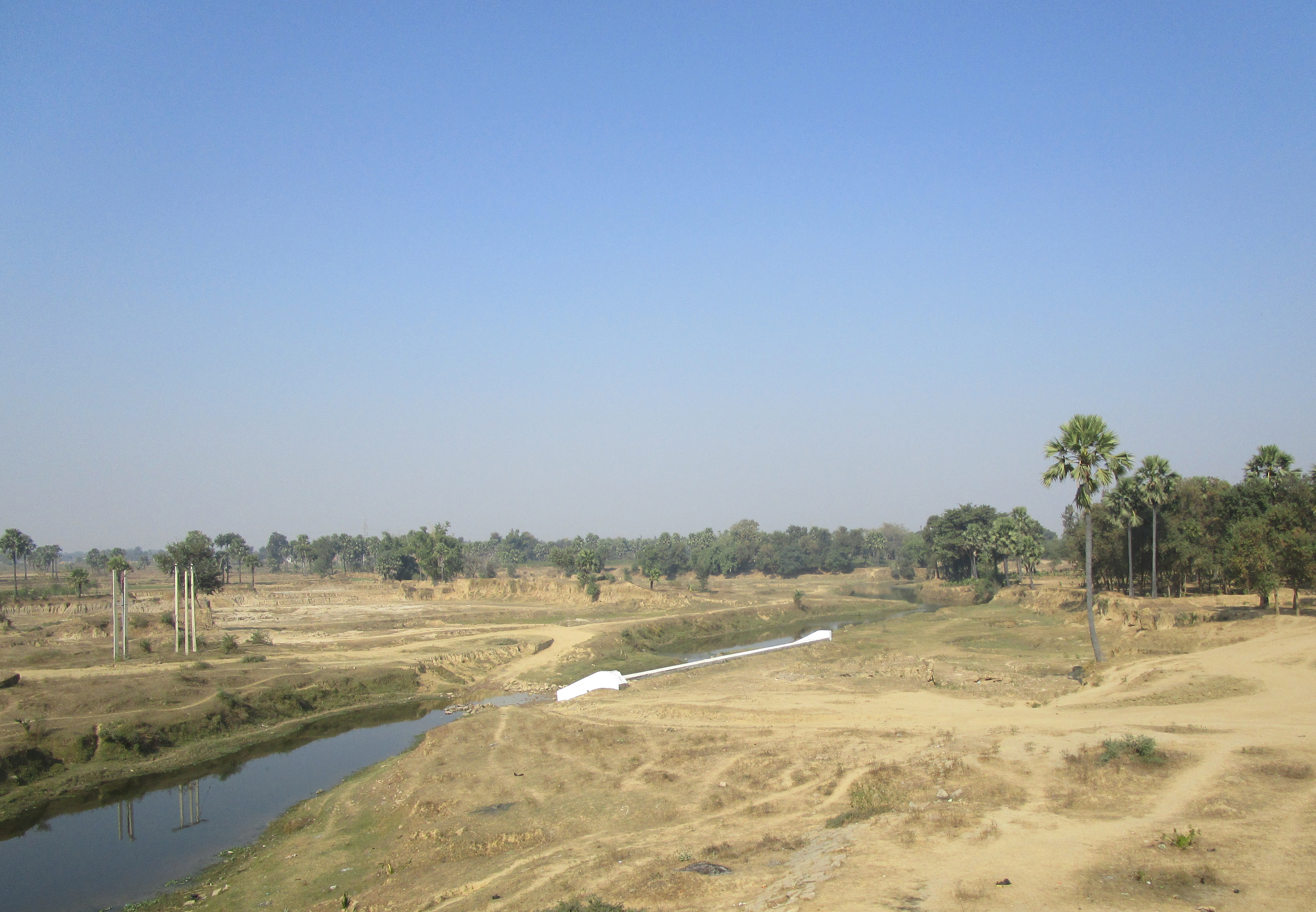
Dhava River in Rafiganj

Rafiganj has an average elevation of 89 metres (291 feet) above sea level. The town is located on the bank of Dhava River.

== Demographics ==
Religious groups in Rafiganj
1. Hindus (68.9%)
2. Muslims (29.3%)
3. Others (1.80%)

As of 2011 India census, the town Rafiganj had a population of 35,536 with a literacy rate of 66.8 percent. In Rafiganj, 16.7 percent of the population is between 0 and 6 years of age.

== Transportation ==
Local inhabitants generally travel by city bus services, auto- and cycle rickshaws, and private transportation. The town is regularly served by bus services connecting Rafiganj to Kasma, Aurangabad, Daudnagar, Gaya, Jamshedpur, Hazaribagh, Ramgarh, Ranchi, and Kolkata.

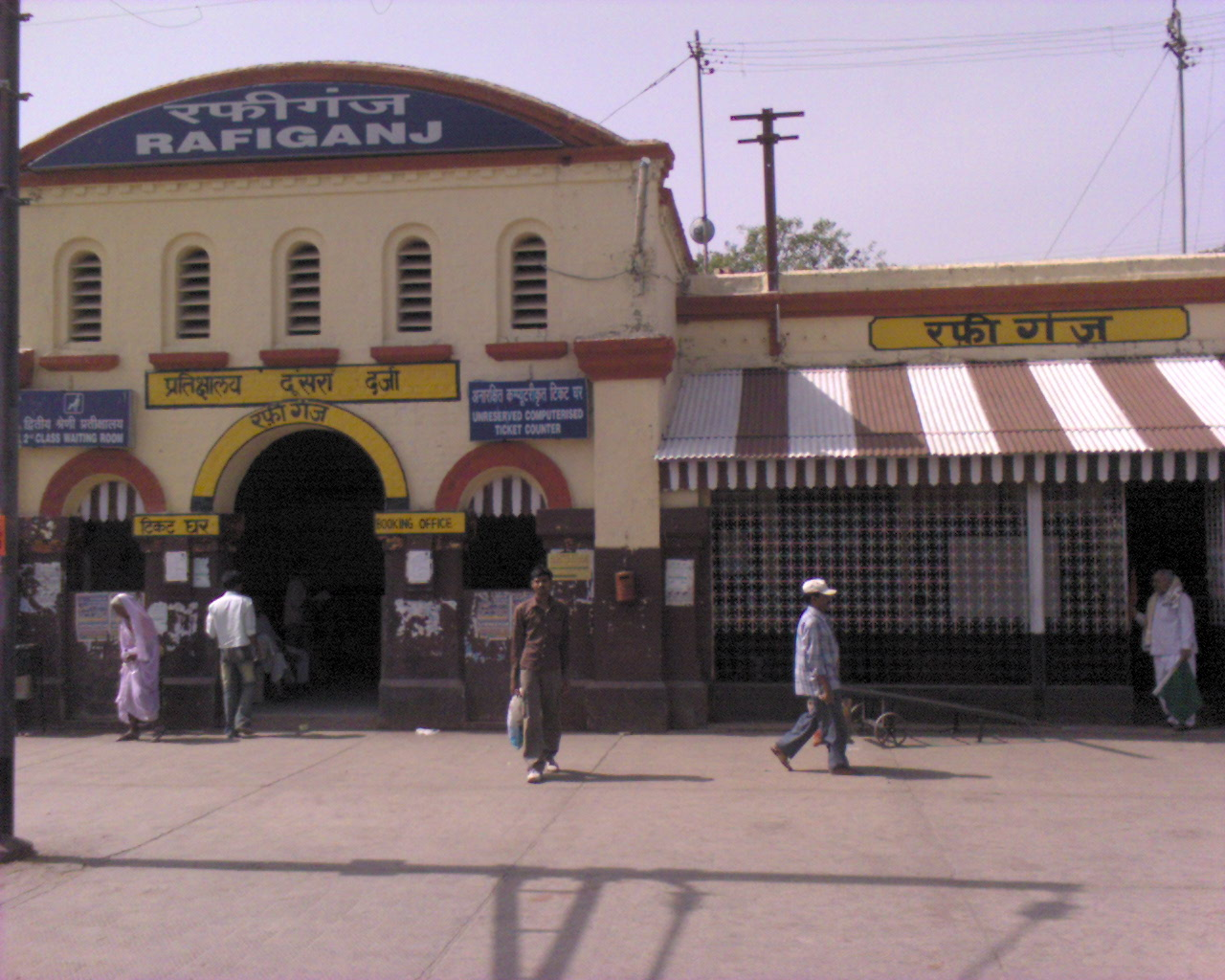
Rafiganj railway station

The Rafiganj Railway Station provides access to numerous express train services, such as the Grand Chord railway line which connects Howrah and New Delhi.

Rafiganj is also traversed by the SH-68 highway which connects the two cities Gaya and Aurangabad with three other towns of the Aurangabad district: Goh, Obra, and Daudnagar.

== Economy ==
The town of Rafiganj has a local market.

== Schools and Colleges ==
- Sanjay Singh Yadav college Rafiganj Aurangabad
- Government Engineering College, Arthua
- Shivam Kidzee School
- Aqsa National Public School
- Govt Urdu Middle School Quazichak (Urdu Middle school)
- Govt Urdu Middle School, Rampur
- B.S.R Public School, Block Road
- British Academy
- The Greenview International School
- R. B. R. High school
- Ambika Public School
- Dr. V. K.Singh College, Rafiganj
- Government High School, Karma
- God's Grace Public School, Noniya Tilha
- Heaven's Blossom, Raja Bagicha
- B.L. Indo Anglian Public School, Aurangabad
- Saraswati Shishu Mandir
- Mount Carmel School Shikshak Colony, Babuganj
- DAV Public School
- Dawn Public School, Uchali
- Tender heart school
- Lakshyadeep International School
- Bosco International Public School
- Bright Life Public School
- Government Middle school
- Government Primary school
- Government Girls High School
- Gyan Bharti Public School
- Shri Ram Krishna Hindi Vidya Pith (Charkawan Market, Main Road Rafiganj)

== Entertainment ==
Local cinema theatres include "Laxmi Talkies" and "Lalita Talkies", where Bollywood, Hollywood and Bhojpuri movies are shown. There are two large sports grounds in Rafiganj: the R.B.R. High School stadium and the Charwaha School playground, mainly used for cricket and football.

== Tourism ==
Important buildings in Rafiganj include: a Jain temple, Durga temple near police station,

a Hindu temple near the main road of the town, and a police station. Other temples in Rafiganj are Dihwar Sthaan, situated near the railway station, and the temple of Parashnath, located on the top of Pachar Pahar, a hill in the outskirts of the town, and where a 30ft painting of Mahavira is kept.

Jama Masjid, a mosque built in 1912, is located in the centre of the town, next to which stands a Madarsa, Jamea Sharfia, which provides education in Urdu Medium. The Madina Masjid mosque is located in Raja Bagicha.
