= Daudnagar =

Daudnagar Dāūdanagara
- Town
- Location in Bihar Location in India Location in Asia
- Coordinates: 25.03°N 84.4°E
- Country: India
- State: Bihar
- Division: Magadh
- District: Aurangabad
- Founder: Daud Khan Qureshi
- Named for: The urban settlement of Daud

Government
  - Type: Municipal council
  - Body: Nagar Parishad Daudnagar
  - Chairperson: Anjali Kumari
  - SDM: Manoj Kumar, BAS
  - DSP: Kumar Rishiraj, BPS
- Elevation: 84 m (276 ft)

Population (2011)
  - Total: 52,364
- Demonym: Daudnagari

Languages
  - Official: Hindi
  - Common: Magahi
- Time zone: UTC+5:30 (IST)
- PIN: 824143
- Telephone code: +91-6328
- ISO 3166 code: IN-BR
- Vehicle registration: BR- 26
- Sex ratio: 1000/905 ♂/♀
- Literacy Rate: 67.51%
- Website: aurangabad.bih.nic.in

Daudnagar (ISO: Dāūdanagara) is a town and the subdivisional headquarter of Daudnagar Subdivision in Aurangabad district in the state of Bihar, India under the Magadh division. Until 1991, there was only one Subdivision in the Aurangabad district: Aurangabad Sadar. On 31 March 1991, one other subdivision, Daudnagar, was created. Daudnagar is a 200-year-old historical city and its living proof is Daudnagar has an old historical fort situated on the eastern bank of the Son River. National Highway NH139 which connects Jharkhand's Palamu district to Patna, passes through the town.

== History ==
Daudnagar was founded by Daud Khan. The area between Daudnagar and Aurangabad assumed great strategic importance when Daud Khan, Aurangzeb's Subedar in Bihar, marched against the Raja of Palamu. As a mark of victory against the Raja in the year 1664, Daud Khan founded the city of Daudnagar. Daud Khan Qureshi was an Indian Muslim Shaikhzada native of Hisar (city) in Haryana, then called Hisar Firuza. The surrounding area was also granted to him as a Jagir by the emperor. Early in the 18th century, Buchanan saw it as a flourishing town with cloth and opium factories. The Sarai, built by Daud Khan was possibly intended to serve as a stronghold, as it was well-fortified with a battlemented wall, two large gates and a surrounding moat. In the outlying part of the town, called Ahmadganj, lies the tomb of Ahmad Khan.

== Geography ==
Daudnagar is located at 25.03°N 84.4°E. It has an average elevation of 84 metres (275 feet).

Daudnagar is situated on the bank of the Son River, and NH139 passes through the town. It is situated 30 kilometres (19 mi) away from the district headquarter Aurangabad The Indrapuri Barrage canal also passes through the town.

== Demographics ==
Religious profile of the town
1. Hindu (80.8%)
2. Muslim (18.8%)
3. Christian (0.15%)
4. Sikh (0.01%)
5. Buddhist (0.01%)
6. Jain (0.04%)
7. Other Religions (0.00%)
8. No religion specified (0.21%)

As of 2011 India census, Daudnagar town has population of 52,364, male population is 27,493 and female population is 24,871. There are 9003 children age 0-6, which is 17.19% of population. The town's female sex ratio is 905 against state average of 918. The child sex ratio in Daudnagar is around 957 compared to the Bihar state average of 935. The literacy rate of the town is 67.51%, which is higher than the state average of 61.80%. Male literacy is around 74.72%, while female literacy rate is 59.44%. Hindus are majority in the town with 80.80% of the population while Muslims constitute 18.78%. Followers of the other religions including Christian, Jain, Sikh, Buddhist also live in Daudnagar but their population is minuscule, just 0.42% of the total population. Schedule Caste (SC) constitutes 12.83% while Schedule Tribe (ST) are 0.08% of the population.

== Administration ==
=== City administration ===
Daudnagar was first identified as a town and given the status of Nagar Panchayat in 1885. The town's population increased from 37,000 in 2001 to more than 52,000 in 2011, which made it eligible for the status of municipal council. Hence, in 2017, the urban development and housing department of the Bihar government, by a notification, upgraded the local governing body from Nagar Panchayat to Nagar Parishad. The Nagar Parishad Daudnagar has been mandated to oversee the day to day administration of the town and provides various services to the residents including sanitation, sewage and drain, door to door municipal solid waste collection and disposal, potable water supply, street lights, roads etc.

==== Municipal authorities ====
The municipal authorities are as follows:

- Municipal Council (consists of Chairperson, Vice chairperson and all the ward councillors)
- Empowered Standing Committee (consists of chairperson, vice chairperson and 3 other members nominated by the board)
- Municipal Chairperson (directly elected)
- Municipal Executive Officer (directly recruited through State Civil Service Exam)

=== Sub-Divisional administration ===
The Daudnagar Subdivision is headed by a SDM who is usually the officer of Indian Administrative Service(IAS) or Bihar Administrative Service. Daudnagar subdivision comprises four blocks, each headed by a Block Development Officer (BDO).

The list of the Blocks is as follows:

- Daudnagar
- Goh
- Haspura
- Obra

== Economy and medical facilities ==
The 2.9km 4 lane Sone bridge which connects Daudnagar on the southern bank with Nasriganj on the northern bank of the Sone River and is located around 105km southwest of Patna was inaugurated on 16 February 2019, by the then District Magistrate cum Collector of Aurangabad district. The Sone Bridge eases traffic and reduces the distance between Rohtas and Gaya by 60km and between Patna and Rohtas by 70km. Traffic coming from the western part of the country and entering Bihar for onward journey to Jharkhand and other eastern states bypass the busy traffic of Patna, saving precious time and fuel. The Son bridge benefits the entire Buddhist circuit as the distance between Kushinagar and Bodhgaya is reduced by 65km providing an alternate route that currently passes through the congested roads of Patna and Gaya.

== Festivals ==
It is one of the cultural towns of Bihar, where Hindu community are in majority followed by Muslim and Christian. Some of the festivals celebrated by the people are Durga puja, Chhath, Diwali, Holi, jiutiya (Jivitputrika), Raksha Bandhan, Eid, Muharram, Eid ul Zuha Uurush, Sab e Barat, Christmas, Makar Sankranti, Vasant Panchami, and Teej . Daudnagar is famous for its unique and grand celebration of the festival of Jiutiya (Jivitputrika) where women keep fast for the longevity of their son. Dring this festival Daudnagari disguise themselves as God, Goddess, demon, King, Queen etc. and roam in the town to showcase their skill. This way of celebrating the jiutiya festival in the town is century long.

== Work profile ==
Out of the total population, 16,446 were engaged in work or business activity. Of this 12,146 were males while 4,300 were females. In census survey, a 'worker' is defined as a person who has a business or job or services as a cultivator or in some other capacity in labour activity. Of the total 16446 working population, 72.15% were engaged in main work while 27.85% of the total workers were engaged in marginal work.

== Educational institutions ==
Daudnagar town, considered the hub of education, has constantly over the years been producing state toppers in High School and Senior Secondary school exams conducted by BSEB, Patna and CBSE, New Delhi.

Daudnagar has many government schools, colleges, private institutions and coaching classes. Students from neighbouring districts also go there for educational purposes. Following is the list of some of the well known government and private institutions.

- Ashok Inter School Daudnagar
- Gyan Ganga Inter School
- DAV Public School, Daudnagar
- Vivekanand Mission School

== Transport and connectivity ==
Daudnagar is about 100km southwest of the capital of Bihar, Patna and is well connected by the roads. NH 98 which is now NH 139 and SH 7 which is now NH 120 passes through the town. Recently built 3km four-lane bridge on the Son river connecting it to Nasriganj reduces the distance between two different towns of Magadh and Shahabad regions of the state. The new road bridge is now considered part of the NH-120.

=== Buses ===
The town has regular bus service facilities in all directions to almost all the major cities

- It has also daily immediate services by Victa-Summo to reach Gaya and Patna.
- Buses for major cities like Ranchi, Jamshedpur, Bokaro and Kolkata are also available.

=== Local transport ===
Auto-rickshaws, E-rickshaws and cycle rickshaws operate in the town.

=== Railways ===
The nearest railway station is Anugraha Narayan Road railway station at Howrah-Delhi main line Grand Chord (daily train to reach National Capital New Delhi) near Pawarganj in Aurangabad.

Other Near railway stations are

- Gaya Junction railway station
- Patna Junction railway station
- Pandit Deen Dayal Upadhyaya Junction railway station
- Varanasi Junction railway station

=== Air ===
Gaya Airport, Bodhgaya, Varanasi and Patna Airport are the nearest airport to the town.

== Villages ==
Daudnagar block contains 60 rural villages, all of which are inhabited:

| Village Name | Population (In 2011) | Literacy | Sex-ratio |
|---|---|---|---|
| Shamshernagar | 10229 | 58.62% | 994 |
| Tarar | 10189 | 60.76% | 919 |
| Gobardhanpur Kanap | 8681 | 58.89% | 923 |
| Sansa | 8013 | 60.28% | 925 |
| Arai | 6988 | 56.97% | 906 |
| Chaunri | 6472 | 57.17% | 929 |
| Anehha | 5976 | 54.08% | 901 |
| Tarari | 5512 | 59.74% | 909 |
| Birai Nawadih | 4366 | 58.47% | 924 |
| Mahawar | 4266 | 57.36% | 991 |
| Jamuawan | 4245 | 51.68% | 964 |
| Manar | 4133 | 54% | 968 |
| Bhakharua | 3824 | 68.38% | 882 |
| Mohamadpur | 3575 | 59.8% | 915 |
| Amauna | 3499 | 58.22% | 964 |
| Gordiha | 3320 | 58.16% | 932 |
| Akorha | 3224 | 61.45% | 939 |
| Belarhi | 3136 | 50.57% | 956 |
| Bwlwa | 2674 | 47.2% | 971 |
| Makhra | 2497 | 62.64% | 940 |
| Balmha | 2405 | 58.84% | 875 |
| Senuar | 2402 | 46.96% | 972 |
| Chauram | 2331 | 52.38% | 943 |
| Kesrarhi | 2152 | 65.47% | 871 |
| Karman | 2022 | 59.89% | 961 |
| Sipah | 1995 | 59.65% | 893 |
| Nonar | 1976 | 57.03% | 949 |
| Ekauni | 1891 | 70.17% | 943 |
| Kera | 1784 | 61.72% | 937 |
| Mayapur | 1763 | 55.3% | 904 |
| Amauna | 1749 | 56.78% | 935 |
| Soni | 1675 | 44.96% | 908 |
| Repura | 1575 | 61.71% | 979 |
| Pilchhi | 1366 | 67.13% | 866 |
| Narotanchak | 1343 | 60.01% | 941 |
| Uchkundhi | 1342 | 54.55% | 906 |
| Paswa | 1317 | 63.55% | 940 |
| Dhanawan | 1304 | 67.71% | 890 |
| Agini | 1248 | 70.67% | 863 |
| Niman | 1246 | 67.17% | 944 |
| Patharkatti | 1221 | 53.89% | 920 |
| Jinoriya | 1117 | 69.38% | 813 |
| Musepurkhaira | 1067 | 61.76% | 859 |
| Dhewahi | 1066 | 66.23% | 967 |
| Khaira | 996 | 60.84% | 949 |
| Nonar | 966 | 51.76% | 1017 |
| Daulatpur | 944 | 49.68% | 934 |
| Angrahi | 944 | 61.02% | 971 |
| Naudiha | 867 | 60.9% | 989 |
| Uchkundha | 861 | 56.91% | 828 |
| Deodattpur | 845 | 60.36% | 920 |
| Kataria | 764 | 60.21% | 974 |
| Khaira | 611 | 57.61% | 921 |
| Sewahi | 561 | 60.07% | 889 |
| Habbuchak | 507 | 55.82% | 1020 |
| Phadarpur | 386 | 55.18% | 892 |
| Deokali | 383 | 78.33% | 1082 |
| Ratanpur | 328 | 71.95% | 929 |
| Guman | 265 | 59.25% | 866 |
| Lalu Chak | 86 | 53.49% | 1098 |

== Notable people ==
- Ishan Kishan, native of Gordiha Village

== See also ==
- List of cities in Bihar
