= Aurangabad district, Bihar =

District in Bihar, India

Aurangabad district
- District
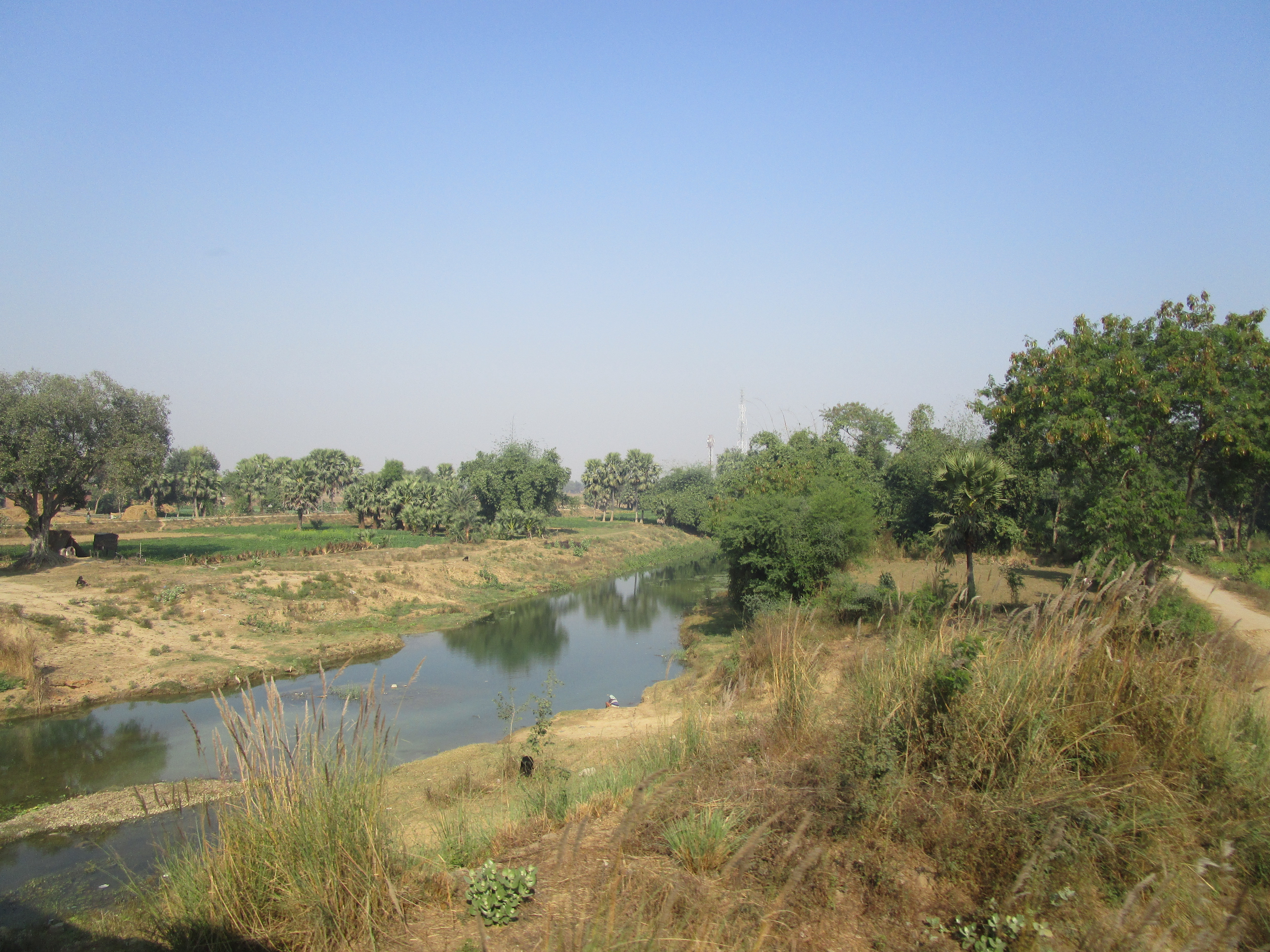
- Adari River
- Interactive map of Aurangabad district
- Country: India
- State: Bihar
- Division: Magadh
- Headquarters: Aurangabad, Bihar

Government
  - MP: Abhay Kushwaha
  - District Magistrate & Collector: Shrikant Shastree IAS
  - Superintendent of police: Ambrish Rahul, I.P.S

Area
  - Total: 3,305 km^{2} (1,276 sq mi)

Population (2011)
  - Total: 2,540,073
  - Density: 768.6/km^{2} (1,991/sq mi)

Demographics
  - Literacy: 72.77%
  - Sex ratio: 916
- Time zone: UTC+05:30 (IST)
- Major highways: NH2 now NH19
- HDI (2016): ▲0.555 (medium)
- Website: aurangabad.bih.nic.in

Aurangabad district is one of the thirty-eight districts of Bihar state, India. It is currently a part of the Red Corridor. Aurangabad played a major role in the Indian independence struggle, and is also the birthplace of eminent nationalist & first Deputy Chief Minister of state, Bihar Vibhuti Dr. Anugrah Narayan Sinha, a participant of Champaran Satyagraha who is regarded among makers of modern independent Bihar. The district headquarters is Aurangabad.

== Geography ==
Aurangabad district occupies an area of 3,389 square kilometres (1,309 sq mi), comparatively equivalent to Russia's Vaygach Island. Aurangabad town is the administrative headquarters of this district. Aurangabad district is a part of Magadh division.

Aurangabad became a fully-fledged district when it was split from the Gaya district in 1972. Aurangabad celebrates its formation day on every 26 January .

== Economy ==
In 2006, the Indian government named Aurangabad one of the country's 250 most backward districts (out of a total of 640). It is one of the 36 districts in Bihar currently receiving funds from the Backward Regions Grant Fund Programme (BRGF). Cultivation of Strawberry have significantly contributed to the economy of the farmers of the district. Many farmers from the south and south-west blocks e.g. Amba, Nabinagar Block are growing straberries and are gaining good profits.

The Famous GI tag holder Magahi Paan is also grown by the Chaurasia community of some villages from Deo block.

== History ==
Since the first Indian general elections in 1952, the Aurangabad Lok Sabha Constituency, which forms a part of Aurangabad district has elected Member of Parliament from Rajput caste only. Other family clans represented in Aurangabad include the Mauryans, Guptas and the Gahadavalas (locally spelt “Gadhwal, Gaharwal in Bihar”).

In ancient times, Aurangabad was located in the Mahajanapada kingdom of Magadh (1200 – 322 BCE). The ancient rulers of the town included Bimbisara (late 5th century BCE), Ajatashatru (early 4th century BCE), Chandragupta Maurya (321 – 298 BCE) and Ashoka (268 – 232 BCE).

During the rule of Sher Shah Suri (1486 – 1545 CE), Aurangabad became strategically important as part of the Rohtas Sirkar(district). After the death of Sher Shah Suri Aurangabad fell under the rule of Akbar. The Afghan upsurge in the area was suppressed by Todar Mal. Some elements of Afghan architecture remain.

After the downfall of the Mughal Empire, Aurangabad was ruled by the zamindars. the wealthy landowners, including those of Deo, Kutumba, Mali, Pawai, Chandragarh, and Siris. The zamindars resisted British rule. For example, Fateh Narayan Singh of Deo, descendent of Shakti Singh, supported Kunwar Singh against the British.

In 1865, Bihar District was separated from Patna District. Aurangabad was made a subdivision of Bihar district. Stement was the first subdivisional officer of Aurangabad subdivision. The first Member of Parliament from the district was the former Chief Minister of Unified Bihar, Satyendra Narayan Singh (Chhote Saheb).

On 26 January 1973, Aurangabad district, Bihar was created (government notification number 07/11-2071-72 dated 19 January 1973). K. A. H. Subramanyam was the first district magistrate and Surjit Kumar Saha was the sub-divisional officer. This district has remained a hotbed of Dalit assertion as a part of Naxalite-Maoist insurgency. It has also witnessed caste wars between the Rajput landlords and Dalits, the latter were led in this struggle by the peasant castes like Koeri and Yadav.

== Demographics ==
Demographics (2011 Census)
S.No.	Description	Value
1	Actual Population	2,540,073
2	Male	1,318,684
3	Female	1,221,389
4	Population Growth	26.18%
5	Area (Sq. Km)	3,305
6	Density (/km²)	769
7	Proportion to Bihar Population	2.44%
8	Sex Ratio (per 1000 males)	926
9	Child Sex Ratio (0–6 Age)	944
10	Average Literacy (%)	70.32
11	Male Literacy (%)	80.11
12	Female Literacy (%)	59.71
13	Total Child Population (0–6 Age)	455,394
14	Male Population (0–6 Age)	234,256
15	Female Population (0–6 Age)	221,138
16	Literates	1,466,002
17	Male Literates	868,733
18	Female Literates	597,269
19	Child Proportion (0–6 Age)	17.93%
20	Boys Proportion (0–6 Age)	17.76%
21	Girls Proportion (0–6 Age)	18.11%

Religions in Aurangabad district (2011)
Religion	Percent
Hinduism	90.20%
Islam	9.34%
Other or not stated	0.46%

According to the 2011 census Aurangabad district, Bihar has a population of 2,540,073, roughly equal to the nation of Kuwait or the US state of Nevada. This gives it a ranking of 172nd in India (out of a total of 640). The district has a population density of 760 inhabitants per square kilometre (2,000/sq mi).

Languages in Aurangabad district (2011)
1. Magahi (69.7%)
2. Hindi (24.7%)
3. Urdu (5.17%)
4. Others (0.46%)

At the time of the 2011 census, 69.69% of the population spoke Magahi, 24.68% Hindi and 5.17% Urdu as their first language.

== Administrative Setup ==
Aurangabad one of the important districts of South Bihar, is bounded on the north by Arwal district, on the south by Palamu district of Jharkhand, on the East by Gaya district and on the west by Sone River beyond which lies Rohtas district. The people of this district mainly speak Magahi and have largely taken up agriculture and other related activities as their occupation. The Grand Trunk Road(NH-19) passes through the district and provides easy transport facility to Kolkata in the east and Delhi in the west. The district headquarters is at Aurangabad, about 170 kms from Patna, the state capital.

== District Magistrate ==
District Magistrate is posted in the district who is the top most official of Revenue and civil administration. He often belongs to I.A.S. cadre. District Magistrate conducts development and welfare works in the district. ADM and other officers are posted in order to help D.M.

== Superintendent of Police ==
The Superintendent of Police, Aurangabad is the head of the district police administration. The Deputy Superintendent of Police are posted to assist the police superintendent who are either from the Indian Police Service or the Bihar Police Service. In each subdivision of the district, the Deputy Superintendent of Police are posted who keep control on police administration.

== Judicial Administration ==
Judicial Administration: The Judges and magistrates are posted at district and sub-division who administer and deliver justice of different kinds. The district judiciary is part of Indian judicial system as envisaged in Indian Constitution and independent of district administration.

== Sub-divisions(Tehsil) ==
The district has been divided into two subdivisions, which are headed by sub-divisional officers either from I.A.S. or B.P.S.C. cadre. S.D.Os. are under direct authority of D.M.

1. Aurangabad
2. Daudnagar

== Blocks ==
These Subdivisions are divided in 11 development blocks where B.D.Os. are posted who undertake development and welfare projects. Aurangabad district has 1884 villages.

CD Blocks	Tehsil (Sub-division)
Aurangabad	Aurangabad
Barun	Aurangabad
Nabinagar	Aurangabad
Kutumba	Aurangabad
Madanpur	Aurangabad
Deo	Aurangabad
Rafiganj	Aurangabad
Obra	Daudnagar
Daudnagar	Daudnagar
Goh	Daudnagar
Haspura	Daudnagar

== Villages and Panchayats ==
Block-wise distribution of Panchayats and Villages in Aurangabad district
Sl. No.	Block	No. of Panchayats	No. of Villages
1	Aurangabad	14	172
2	Barun	17	201
3	Madanpur	18	124
4	Nabinagar	25	352
5	Obra	20	152
6	Haspura	14	73
7	Rafiganj	23	220
8	Deo	16	122
9	Kutumba	20	228
10	Daudnagar	15	64
11	Goh	20	176
Total		202	1,884

== Politics ==
=== Constituencies ===
Aurangabad district is represented in both the Parliament (Lok Sabha) and the Bihar Legislative Assembly (Vidhan Sabha). The district is divided between two parliamentary constituencies—Karakat and Aurangabad—and includes six assembly constituencies.

Parliamentary and Assembly Constituencies in Aurangabad District
S.No	District	Parliamentary Constituency No.	Parliamentary Constituency Name	Assembly Constituency No.	Assembly Constituency Name
1	Aurangabad	35	Karakat	219	Goh
2	Aurangabad	35	Karakat	220	Obra
3	Aurangabad	35	Karakat	221	Nabinagar
4	Aurangabad	37	Aurangabad	222	Kutumba
5	Aurangabad	37	Aurangabad	223	Aurangabad
6	Aurangabad	37	Aurangabad	224	Rafiganj

District	No.	Constituency	Name	Party	Alliance	Remarks
Aurangabad	219	Goh	Amrender Kushwaha	RJD	MGB	
Aurangabad	220	Obra	Prakash Chandra	LJP(RV)	NDA	
Aurangabad	221	Nabinagar	Chetan Anand	JD(U)	NDA	
Aurangabad	222	Kutumba (SC)	Lalan Ram	HAM(S)	NDA	
Aurangabad	223	Aurangabad	Trivikram Singh	BJP	NDA	
Aurangabad	224	Rafiganj	Pramod Kumar Singh	JD(U)	NDA	

== Lok Sabha Elections 2024 Results ==
Parliamentary Constituency		Winner			Runner Up			Margin
No.	Name	Candidate	Party	Votes	Candidate	Party	Votes	Votes
35	Karakat	Raja Ram Singh Kushwaha	CPI(ML)L	3,80,581	Pawan Singh	Independent	2,74,723	1,05,858
37	Aurangabad	Abhay Kumar Sinha	RJD	4,65,567	Sushil Kumar Singh	BJP	3,86,456	79,111

== Tourism ==
- Deo Surya Mandir
- Deo Fort
- Umga Sun Temple
- Biodiversity Park, Deo in Aurangabad district
- Kalpavriksha Dham
- Patalganga Math
- Gajana Dham

== See also ==
- Barun, India town in Aurangabad District
- Daudnagar, A major town of Aurangabad district
- Deo, town in Aurangabad district
- Surkhi, a village in Aurangabad district
- Uphara, a village in Aurangabad district
