= Deo =

Deo or DEO may refer to:

== People ==
- Derek Oldbury (1924–1994), known as DEO, a British draughts champion

=== Surname ===
- Abhinay Deo, Indian film director and screenwriter
- Ajinkya Deo (born 1964), Indian film actor
- Ananga Udaya Singh Deo (born 1945), Indian politician
- Anant Pratap Deo, Indian politician
- Arka Keshari Deo, Indian politician
- Arkesh Singh Deo (born 1986), Indian politician
- Ashish Deo, Indian script writer and film director
- Baljit Singh Deo, Indian music video and movie director
- Bikram Keshari Deo (1952–2009)), Indian politician
- Bira Kesari Deo (1927–2012)), Indian politician
- Gobind Singh Deo (born 1973), Malaysian politician and lawyer
- Jagannatha Gajapati Narayana Deo II (c.1733–1771)), king of Paralakhemundi state, southern Odisha, India
- Jagdeep Singh Deo (born 1971), Malaysian politician
- Jitamitra Prasad Singh Deo (born 1946), Indian historian and archaeologist
- Kalikesh Narayan Singh Deo (born 1974), Indian politician and army officer
- Kamakhya Prasad Singh Deo (born 1941), Indian politician
- Kanak Vardhan Singh Deo (born 1956), Indian politician
- Kishore Chandra Deo (born 1947), Indian politician
- Laxmi Narayan Bhanja Deo (1912–1986), Indian politician
- M. G. Deo, (born 1932), Indian oncologist, pathologist and educationist
- Narsingh Deo, Indian and American professor of computer science
- Neelam Deo, Indian Foreign Service Officer
- Pratap Keshari Deo (1919–2001), Indian politician and the last ruler of Kalahandi State
- Pravir Chandra Bhanj Deo (1929–1966), first Odia ruler and 20th Maharaja of Bastar state, India
- Rajendra Narayan Singh Deo (1912–1975), Indian politician and the last ruler of Patna
- Ramesh Deo (1929–2022), Indian film and television actor
- Roshika Deo (born 1981), Fijian feminist and activist
- Sangeeta Kumari Singh Deo (born 1961), Indian politician
- Sankar Narayan Singh Deo (born 1922), Indian politician
- Seema Deo, Indian film actress
- Shankarrao Deo, Indian politician
- Shirish Baban Deo, Indian Air Marshal
- Sriram Chandra Bhanj Deo (1870–1912), Maharaja of Mayurbhanj State, India
- Suresh Deo (born 1946), Indian cricket umpire
- T. S. Singh Deo (born 1952), Indian politician
- Vir Singh Deo (fl.1605–1626), ruler of the kingdom of Orchha and a vassal of the Mughal Empire
- Vishnu Deo (1900–1968), Indo-Fijian political leader

=== Forename ===
- Agni Deo Singh, Indo-Fijian teacher and trade unionist
- Akanksha Deo Sharma (born 1992), Indian industrial designer, textile innovator and visual artist
- Arjun Deo Charan (born 1954), Indian poet, critic, playwright, theatre director and translator
- Deo (futsal player) or André Henrique Justino (born 1982), Brazilian futsal player
- Deo Debattista, Maltese politician
- Deo Filikunjombe (1972–2015), Tanzanian politician
- Deo Gracia Ngokaba (born 1997), Congolese judoka
- Déo Kanda (born 1989), Congolese footballer
- Deo A. Koenigs (born 1935), American politician
- Deo Kumar Singh (1950–2018), leader of the Indian Maoist movement
- Deo Nang Toï (1914–2008), daughter and successor of Deo Van Long, president of the Fédération Taï, French Indochina
- Deo Narain, Fijian politician
- Deo Narayan Yadav (c.1921–2003), Indian politician
- Deo Nath Yadav, Indian politician
- Deo Nukhu, Indian politician
- Deo Prakash Rai (1926–1981), Indian politician
- Déo Rian (born 1944), Brazilian musician
- Deo Rwabiita (1943–2017), Ugandan politician and diplomat
- Deo Sanga (born 1956), Tanzanian politician
- Đèo Văn Long (1887–1975), leader of the Autonomous Tai Federation of North-western Tonkin, French Indochina
- Đèo Văn Trị (1849–1908), White Tai leader at Muang Lay in the Federation of the Twelve Tai states, French Indochina
- Harsh Deo Malaviya (1917–1989), Indian journalist and economist with socialist ideas
- Kapil Deo Kamat (1951–2020), Indian politician
- Ram Deo Bhandary (1940–2018), Indian politician
- Ram Deo Ram (born 1937), Indian politician
- Satya Deo Singh (1945–2020), Indian politician
- Surya Deo Sharma, Hindu leader and Trustee of Shri Peetambra Peeth Datia, India
- Vikram Deo Verma (1869–1951), 25th king of the Suryavansh dynasty that ruled over Kalinga and Jeypore Samasthanam, India
- Vyas Deo Sharma, Fijian politician

== Places ==
=== India ===
- Deo, Bihar, a city in Bihar state, north-eastern India
- Deo Barunark, a village in Bihar
- Deo Damla, a mountain of the Garhwal Himalaya in Uttarakhand
- Deo Fort, a fort in Deo, Bihar
- Deo Raj, a zamindari estate in Deo, Bihar
- Deo River, Jharkhand
- Deo Surya Mandir, a Hindu temple in Bihar
- Deo Tibba, a mountain in Kullu District, Himachal Pradesh
- Lohar Deo, a mountain of the Garhwal Himalaya in Uttarakhand

=== Elsewhere ===
- Coram Deo Academy, a Christian school in Texas, USA
- Đèo Gia, a commune and village in north-eastern Vietnam
- Deo Sial, a town in Pakistan
- Deutsche Evangelische Oberschule, a German school in Cairo, Egypt
- Dragi Deo, a village in Serbia
- Faro-et-Déo, a department of Adamawa Province, Cameroon
- Kala Deo, a village in Pakistan

== Other uses ==
- Deo, a synonym of the Greek goddess Demeter
- Defence Exhibition Organisation, an autonomous organisation of the Indian Government
- Department of Extranormal Operations, a fictional organization from DC Comics
- Ex Deo, a Canadian death metal band

== See also ==
- Deò-ghrèine
- Dio (disambiguation)
