= Sūryaśataka =

Hindu hymn in praise of Surya

Surya Shataka
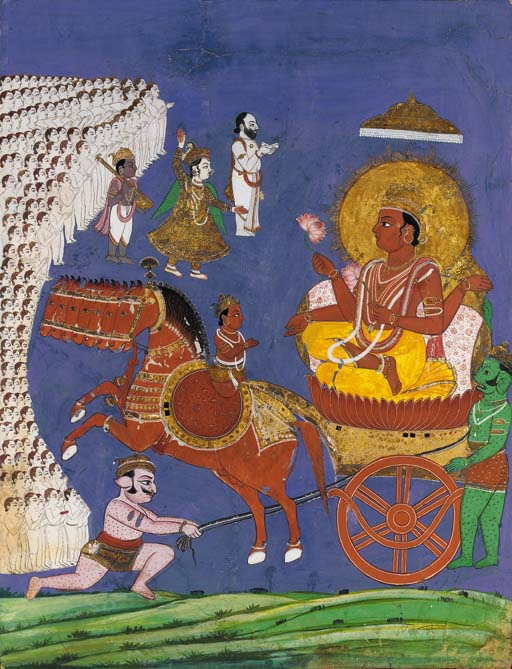
- 17th-century Tanjore-style painting of Surya

Information
- Religion: Hindu
- Author: Mayurabhatta
- Language: Sanskrit
- Period: 7th century
- Verses: 100

The Surya Shataka (Sanskrit: सूर्यशतक, romanized: Sūryaśataka) is a 7th-century Sanskrit hymn composed in praise of the Hindu sun god Surya by the poet Mayura Bhatta, comprising one hundred verses.

== Etymology ==
Surya Shataka translates to a "century of stanzas in praise of the Sun" in Sanskrit.

== Description ==
Tribhuvanapala, in his commentary of this hymn, makes six divisions of this work. Verses 1 to 43 extol the rays of Surya, 44 to 49 praise the horses of the deity, and 50 to 61 hail Aruna, the charioteer of the sun god. Verses 62 - 72 extol the chariot of Surya, 73 - 80 praise the Suryamandala (circular motions of the sun), and 81 to 100 hail various depictions of the sun.

== Legend ==
The composition of the Surya Shataka is commonly regarded to have cured the poet of leprosy due to the grace of Surya. In other accounts, the illness cured is stated to be blindness.

According to temple tradition, Mayura undertook a penance to propitate Surya at the Deo Surya Mandir located at Deo in present-day Aurangabad district, Bihar. While he was composing the verses, he was troubled by a brahmarakshasa, but he was able to defeat him and please the sun god to be cured of leprosy. The hundred verses he composed became known as the Surya Shataka.

== Hymn ==
The first verse of the Surya Shataka is as follows:

jambhārātībhakumbhodbhavamiva dadhataḥ sāndrasindūrareṇuṃ
raktāḥ siktāivaughairudayagiritaṭīdhātudhārādravasya
āyāntyā tulyakālaṃ kamalavanarucevāruṇā vo vibhūtyaya
bhūyāsurbhāsayanto bhuvanamabhinavā bhānavo bhānavīyāḥ

The early rays of the Sun look red as if they have resumed the thick streaks of vermilion, coming out of the temple of elephant of the killer of Jambha (Indra). They also appear as if they are drenched by the mineral streams of the slopes of Udayacala (mountain). Carrying the lustre of the blooming lotus, that open up at their advent, they illuminate the whole world. May those rays bestow prosperity on you.

== See also ==
- Ādityahṛdayam
- Gayatri Mantra
