= Neelam (given name) =

Neelam or Neelum is a given name, taken from the Sanskrit word for sapphire.

== People with the name ==
- Neelam Saxena Chandra (born 1969), Indian poet and author
- Neelam Ibrar Chattan (born 1994), Pakistani human rights activist
- Neelam Chaturvedi (born 1960), Indian human rights activist
- Neelam Mansingh Chowdhry (born 1951), Indian theatre artist
- Neelam Deo, Indian ambassador
- Neelam Giri, Indian pediatric hematologist/oncologist
- Neelam Gill (born 1995), British model
- Neelam Gorhe (born 1954), Maharashtra politician
- Neelum Saran Gour (born 1955), Indian writer
- Neelam Jain (born 1954), Indian Jain journalist
- Neelam Kler, Indian neonatologist
- Neelam Kothari (born 1968), Indian Hindi film actress and jewellery designer
- Neelam Mehra, Indian Hindi television and film actress
- Neelam Muneer Khan, Pakistani television actress
- Neelam Karki Niharika, Nepalese writer
- Neelam Shirke (born 1980), actress in Marathi language television
- Neelam Jaswant Singh (born 1971), Indian discus thrower
- Neelam Sivia (born 1988), Indian actress
- Neelam Sonkar (born 1973), Uttar Pradesh politician
- Neelam Upadhyaya, Indian actress in Tamil and Telugu films
- Neelam Verma (born 1980), television anchor and Miss Universe Canada 2002
