= Bharat–Nepal Jhim Chhath Ghat =

Shared Chhath Puja Ghat between India and Nepal

Bharat - Nepal Jhim Chhath Ghat भारत – नेपाल झिम छैठ घाट Jhim Nadi Ghat
- Chhath Ghat
- Nickname: Jhim Chhath Ghat
- Country: India and Nepal
- Region: Mithila region
- States: Bihar and Madhesh Pradesh
- Districts: Sitamarhi and Sarlahi

Bharat - Nepal Jhim Chhaith Ghat (Maithili: भारत – नेपाल झिम छैठ घाट) is a shared holy Chhath Puja Ghat in the Mithila region of the Indian subcontinent. It is located on the banks of the Jhim river flowing from the Sarlahi district of Nepal to the Sitamarhi district of Bihar in India. The location lies in the Sonbarsa block of the Sitamarhi district near the India-Nepal border. It is also called as Jhim Nadi Ghat. The location of the ghat lies in the Sonbarsa block of the Sitamarhi district near Indo-Nepal border. It is considered as a symbol of cultural friendship, mutual brotherhood, love, affection and unity between the two culturally tied nations India and Nepal.

== Description ==
The Bharat - Nepal Jhim Chhath Ghat is famous for organizing common grand celebration of Chhath Puja on the banks of the Jhim river between the two countries India and Nepal. Apart from the Chhath Puja festival, the holy river bank is also known for sacred bath of the Hindu adherents in the region on the occasion of different auspicious days. During the festival of the Kartik Purnima, huge number of devotees flock here from the both countries to take holy bath on the auspicious day. Every year on the occasion the auspicious day of Kartik Purnima, a famous fair known as Ichchhavati Mela is held on the banks of the Jhim Ghat.

During the festival of Chhath Puja, a large number of Chhath Vrati (devotees) from both the countries celebrate the great festival of faith by building ghats on the Jhim river. The Jhim river belongs to the Adhwara group of rivers in the Mithila region of the Indian subcontinent. Around 10 thousands Chhath Vrati of the both countries come here to offer Araghya to Lord Suryanarayana. The joint offering of Araghya to Suryadeva by the devotees of the both countries symbolises the Beti-Roti ka rishta between the two nations. This relationship is seen to be fulfilled here on the occasion Chhath Puja at the banks of the river.
