= Mayūrabhaṭṭa =

7th century Sanskrit poet and Hindu scholar

- Born: Pritikuta, Pushyabhuti Empire (present-day Bihar, India)
- Occupation: Poet
- Works: Sūryaśataka
- Relatives: Bāṇabhaṭṭa (brother-in-law)

Mayūrabhaṭṭa (Sanskrit: मयूरभट्ट) was a 7th-century Sanskrit poet and Hindu scholar, who is noted for having composed the Sūryaśataka. He was the brother-in-law of Bāṇabhaṭṭa, the court poet of Emperor Harsha.

== Composition of the Suryashataka ==
Mayurbhatta was suffering from leprosy. He performed a penance at the famous Surya Temple in Deo in present-day Aurangabad district, Bihar. He composed one hundred verses in praise of the Lord Surya - the Sun God, and was cured of his severe illness. While he was composing the verses, he was troubled by a Brahmarakṣasa but he was able to defeat him and please the Sun God. The verses he composed became known as Sūryaśataka.

There is a very interesting story behind the composition of Sūryaśataka (The mysterious hills Umga by Premendra Mishra-6). According to which, Mayurabhatta, was the father-in-law or brother-in-law of Banabhatta, another court poet of Emperor Harsha. Bana introduces himself as a Brahmana in the Harshacharita and his residence as a 'Brahmana abode'. Once, Bana's wife became angry. She remained angry overnight. It was about to be morning. The moon began to brighten. The flame of the candle began to tremble. But she did not budge. Being impatient, Bana composed a verse and pleaded humbly. The three lines of verse are as follows-

Gatpraya ratri: krishtanu shashi shiryat ev

Pradeepoaym nidra vashmugto ghurnan ev

Pranamanto manstsyjasi n tathapi kruddhmaho

Meanwhile, the poet Mayura came there and heard the composition. His poetic consciousness was awakened. He forgot the dignity of the relationship and the fourth line spontaneously came out of his mouth-

Kunchpratyasttya hridaymapi te chandi kathitam

This line hurt Bana and his wife. Especially Bana's wife who became apocleptic with rage on such intervention. She cursed Mayura to suffer with leprosy.

Soon, Mayura undertook a penance at the revered Sun Temple in Deo to get cured from leprosy. He composed the hundred verses of Sūryaśataka under a Peepal tree in front of the shrine. Mayura tied a hundred threads to the Peepal tree. He composed a verse every day and untied a thread from the tree. He was determined that if Lord Surya did not cure him, he would commit suicide by jumping ff the tree. But soon he got upset with a Brahmarakshasa who lived on the same peepal tree. The Brahmarakshasa started troubling him by repeating the verses chanted by him. Soon the victim Mayura got a tip. He started chanting verses from his nose, which Brahmarakshasa, who had no nose, failed to repeat and gave up. After this, Mayura completed Sūryaśataka uninterruptedly. However, by virtue of listening to the Sūryaśataka, the Brahmarakshasa became free from his phantom-form. Mayura was also cured of leprosy by the grace of Lord Surya. Many authors have mentioned similar narrations of the event in their books.

The Sūryaśataka contains one hundred verses in praise of the Lord Surya. According to 'Surys Shatak' (Chaukhamba Publication, Varanasi) in verse no. 6 of Surya-Shatak, there is reference of leprosy and other descriptions of suffering it which may prove that the poet Mayur Bhatta had suffered from leprosy for a long time and prayed to lord Sun to be cured. Some scholars believe that Mayura was actually cured after composing this epic. The 6th verse of Surya Shatak goes to show that the Sun cures those who because of their numerous sins have bodies festered with wounds, nose feet and hands emaciated, and who emit long drawn sighs and utter indistinct words. His rays vindicate his unbounded and unimpeded compassion and are always worshipped by the Siddhas. May those rays ward off all your sins quickly.

== Biography ==
Many Shakaldwipi Brahmins of the village Mayar in Aurangabad district of Bihar, consider themselves to be descendants of Mayurabhatta. Mayurabhatta's tradition of sun worship is still in existence in the 'Mayar' village.

Mayura has neither introduced himself nor has he given his whereabouts anywhere. But the famous historian K.C. Srivastava (Prachin Bharat Ka Itihas tatha sanskriti]) states that Bana, a close relative and friend of Mayura has written his own autobiography in detail in the first three chapters of his famous composition Harṣacarita. On the basis of Bana Bhatta's description, some rational speculations about Mayur Bhatta can be made. In the Harshacharita, Banabhatta's describes himself as Vatsyayana Gotriya and Bhriguvanshi who used to reside in a village called Pritikuta. He was a Shakadwipiya Brahmana (Mag or Bhojaka). He has also describes his childhood in the Harshacharita. Banabhatta describes Pritikuta as a village on the banks of the river Hiraṇyavāhu which is identified with present-day Son River . According to the book 'Etihasik Sthanawali' (author- Vijayendra Kumar Mathur, page 592) of the Rajasthan Hindi Granth Academy, Jaipur, Banabhatta has described the village of Pritikuta as situated to the south of the confluence of the Ganges and Son rivers. The present-day Piru village is located in the Haspura block of Aurangabad district on the eastern bank of the river Son. It is situated 15 kilometres from the Rishi Bhrigu's historical ashram Bhrigurari, located in the Goh block of Aurangabad district. Mayurabhatta is considered to be a native of the Mayar (Shamshernagar) village of Daudnagar block in the Aurangabad district. The village is named in his honour. It's situated about 14 kilometres from the Pritikuta village which is identified with present-day Piru.

Mayurabhatta was also a toxicologist. In the first chapter (Uchchhavas) of the Harshacharita, Banabhatta describes him as one of his 44 childhood friends. Dr. Keshavrao Musalgaonkar of the Chaukhamba Sanskrit Institute states that Banabhatta has associated himself with the Goddess Saraswati and that after being cursed by Rishi Durvasa, Saraswati was forced to leave Brahmaloka and stay on earth. Her stay on earth was to end at the sight of her own son's face. Saraswati made her debut on the western bank of the Son River presently known as Shahabad region. Soon she fell in love with Dadhichi, son of Bhrigukul-Vanshi- Chyawan who used to come to meet her crossing the river Son. According to the Harshacharita, Dadhichi's father's house was situated across (in the east of) the River Son. Soon Saraswati bore a son from the union with Dadhichi, who was named Saraswat. With his birth, Saraswati was freed from Durvasa's curse and returned to Brahmaloka. Distracted by this separation, Dadhichi handed over his son to his own Bhrigu-Vanshi brother for upbringing and undertook a penance.

With the blessings of his mother Saraswati, Saraswat became well versed in the Vedas and other scripture. He settled in Pritikuta and later he too went to join his father in penance. Later in the same clan, Munis, like Vatsa, Vatsyayana and Banabhatta were born. This description shows that Banabhatta and Mayurabhatta were residents of the eastern bank of the Son River. Rishi Chyavana's ashram is also situated in the village Deokund under the Goh block of Aurangabad district. On this basis, we can speculate the place of origin of Mayurabhatta because in ancient times, kith and kin lived close in the surrounding villages as the means of transport and communication were very less developed.

These areas, more particularly Piru and Mayar, are located near the eastern bank of the Son River. The slight geographical distance of these four historical sites i.e. Mayar, Piru, Bhrigurari, Chyawan Ashram at Deokund and the presence of the Son River emphasizes that it is the same Mayar and Pritikuta villages that once housed Mayurabhatta and Banabhatta respectively. Some residents of these two villages consider themselves descendants of Mayurabhatta and Banabhatta respectively. The Mayar village is situated about 55 km from Deo, Bihar.

The literary meaning of the words Son and Hiranya is ‘gold’. Sands of the Son River contain particles of gold. This is the reason the river is named Son or Hiranyavaha. Historian P.C. Roy Chaudhary (The Gaya Gazetteer, 1957, Govt. of Bihar) also has called the river ‘Son’ as ‘Hirnyabahu’.
