= Jagannath Prasad Singh Kinkar =

Raja Jagannath Prasad Singh Kinkar (died 1938) was an Indian ruler of Deo Raj, a princely estate in present day Aurangabad district of Bihar. He was noted for producing Bihar's first film, Chhat Mela, in 1930. It was a silent documentary film on the Chhath festival of Deo.

== Work ==
Raja Jagannath Prasad Singh produced his first film Chhat Mela in 1930, which is considered to be the first film of Bihar's cinema. It took 32 days to make the film. It was produced, directed and written by Raja Jagannath himself. After the film was made, it was first screened in the grounds of the palace of Raja Jagannath. People from Gaya, Jehanabad, Aurangabad, Nawada, Sasaram and Patna had reached there to watch it.

After his first success, Raja Saheb produced a feature film, 'Vilvamangal' on the love story of Surdas in 1932 under the banner of Mahalaxmi Movie Tone. The story and dialogue writer was Raja Jagannath Prasad Singh himself, the screenwriter and director were Dhirendra Nath Ganguly, and AK Sen and S. David did the cinematography of the film. The film was shot at various locations in Dev and Gaya. Raja Jagannath himself played the character of Vilvamangal's father. The public screening of the film was done for the first time in January 1933 by Ratan Talkies. It was ceremonially held at Ranchi and inaugurated by Sir Maurice Garnier Hallett, the Chief Secretary to the Government of Bihar and Orissa Province.

He produced another feature film, Punarjanma under the direction of filmmaker Dhirendra Nath Ganguly in the 1930s. He had published a song collection in Magahi language in 1934.

== Filmography ==
- Chhat Mela (1930)
- Vilvamangal (1932)
- Punarjanma (1933)

== Legacy ==
A memorial award called Filmmaker Raja Jagannath Singh Kinkar Award was named after him. A state government-owned school, Raja Jagannath High School in Deo, Aurangabad is named after him. It was established in 1938.

== See also ==
- Deo Raj
- Deo Fort
- Dadasaheb Phalke

Preceded by Maharaja Bhishma Narayan Singh	Raja of the Deo Raj till 1938	Succeeded by British rule
