= Sunita Singh Choken =

Indian activist and mountaineer

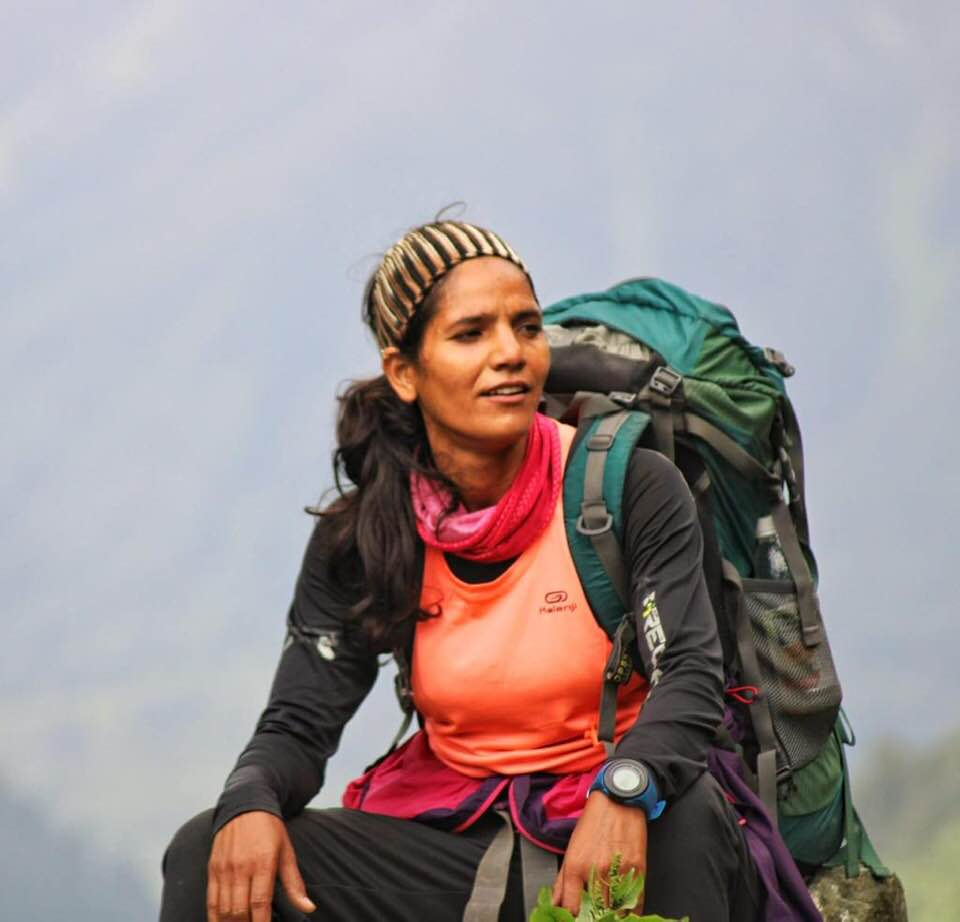
- Kolahoi Peak expedition, 2019
- Occupations: Mountaineer, activist
- Known for: Climbing Mount Everest, Beti Bachao Beti Padhao
- Awards: Nari Shakti Puraskar (2016)

Sunita Singh Choken (born c. 1985) is an Indian mountaineer and activist. She climbed Mount Everest in 2011. Afterwards she did two long-distance cycle trips to promote both the environment and the "Save, educate the girl child" campaign (Beti Bachao Beti Padhao). She has received several awards including the 2016 Nari Shakti Puraskar.

== Early life ==
Sunita Singh Choken was born in 1985 in a Hindu Gurjar Family. She grew up in Rewari (Haryana) and Kishorpura (Rajasthan) finishing her schooling in Amritsar, (Punjab). Her father worked for the Border Security Force. Choken studied mountaineering in Manali and Darjeeling.

== Career ==
Choken climbed five mountains in Manali, Darjeeling and Uttarkashi, then was chosen by Nepal to join an expedition going to the summit of Mount Everest. She climbed Everest in 2011, at the age of 25, making her the youngest woman from Haryana to make the ascent. She then scaled several other Himalayan peaks.

In 2017, Choken began a cycle trip of 4,200 km from Kanyakumari to Leh aiming to promote the campaigns "Save, educate the girl child" (Beti Bachao, Beti Padhao) and "Preserve environment". She ultimately covered 4,656 km and planted 220 trees along the route. After the trip, she returned to Amritsar to teach yoga, on the invitation of Vivekananda Kendra. Choken was appointed a deputy superintendent of police (DSP) in Haryana Police in 2018 following a decision by the Punjab and Haryana High Court regarding the previous appointment to DSP of Mamta Sodha. Also in 2018, she made another cycle trip to promote Beti Bachao, Beti Padhao, this time covering a distance of 5,000 km from the Somnath Temple (Gujarat) to Nepal.

== Awards and recognition ==
Choken received the 2016 Nari Shakti Puraskar, presented by the President of India, Pranab Mukherjee. She has also been recognised with the Border Security Force Brave Daughter, the Bharat Gaurav and the Kalpana Chawla awards.
