= Manaitand =

Coordinates: 23.784655°N 86.429281°E

Manaitand is a locality within Dhanbad district, Jharkhand, India.

It is a fully residential place surrounded by schools, colleges, markets with other commercial bodies. It is barely 2 kilometers (1.2 mi) from the Dhanbad railway station towards the Purana Bazar side. It has quite a number of water bodies surrounding it namely the Chath Talab (dedicated to the festival of Chath, famous in Bihar/Jharkhand), Singara talab, Dhobi bandh etc. It also houses the famous Pranjivan Academy high secondary school among other schools. It is a good place to be.
