= Sultana, Rajasthan =

Sultana is a town located in the Jhunjhunu District of the Indian state of Rajasthan. It falls under the Jaipur Division and is situated 25 km east of the district headquarters, Jhunjhunu, and about 200 km from the state capital, Jaipur.

The PIN code of Sultana is 333028, and the postal head office is in Sultana.

Nearby villages include Kithana (4 km), Kishorpura ( 2.5 km), Ardawata (7 km), Bhukana (8 km), Nari (8 km), and Silarpuri (8 km). The town is geographically surrounded by Jhunjhunu Tehsil to the west, Khetri Tehsil to the east, and Chirawa Tehsil to the north.

The region is predominantly inhabited by Marwaris, with main castes including Ahirs, Rajputs, Jats, and Muslims. With a population over 40000, Sultana is a well-developed town featuring several services such as banks, hospitals, a power station, a police sub station, a post office, towers (Shree tower), schools, and a library (Shree international Library).

== Travel ==
Sultana is not accessible directly by rail. The nearest railway stations is Chirawa (12 km) served by Northern Western Railway and lying on the Sikar-Loharu Broad Gauge section.
