= Kala Deo =

Village in Punjab, Pakistan

Kala Deo کالا دیو
- Interactive map of Kala Deo
- Coordinates: 32.9719°N 73.7518°E
- Country: Pakistan
- Province: Punjab
- District: Jhelum

Area
  - Total: 0.33560316 km^{2} (0.12957710 sq mi)
- Time zone: Pakistan Standard Time

Kala Deo is a village in the northern part of Punjab, Pakistan. Situated near the Jhelum River, Kala Deo is approximately 96 kilometers southeast of Islamabad, and 5 kilometers north of the city of Jhelum.

== Khanqah-e-Sultania Mosque ==
The village is known for the Khanqah-e-Sultania Mosque (also known as the Khanqah-e-Sultania Mosque), which is believed to have been built around 1960's by a family of Islamic scholars. Some members of this family were displaced during the construction of the Mangla Dam. The mosque is named after Sultania, the household in Kala Deo where these scholars resided prior to the construction of this mosque. The land on which the original mosque and its grounds are situated was donated by the Sultania family. Sultania was buried inside the masjid grounds after he died, and over time, other descendants of the family were also buried there.
