= Sohari =

Traditional flatbread of the Bhojpuri region

- Alternative names: Soharee, Suhari
- Type: Flatbread
- Region or state: Mithila, Bhojpur-Purvanchal
- Associated cuisine: Indian, Nepalese, Trinidad and Tobago
- Serving temperature: Hot
- Main ingredients: Atta, water, oil or ghee
- Similar dishes: Puri, Bhatura, Luchi

Sohari, also spelt as Soharee or Suhari, a thin, deep-fried flatbread originating from the Mithila and Bhojpur-Purvanchal region of India and Nepal.

It is used by the Bhojpuri and Maithil community across the Terai region of Nepal and Bihar and Uttar Pradesh, India as a prasada during festivals like Chhath, Navaratri, Jitiya, and Kojagra, as well as in the Matkor ceremony. Variations also exist in the Newar cuisine and Chhattisgarhi cuisine, where it is known as Swari, and Sohari respectively. It is also used by the Indian diaspora in Trinidad and Tobago, where they combine it with lapsi as a Hindu offering and they called the Calathea lutea leaf that they serve food on a sohari leaf after the sohari because the leaf was used to place soharis on after frying.

Sohari are made of atta or maida, mixed into dough with water and cooked on a tava or deep fried with ghee or mustard oil over direct heat. They are larger and thinner than puri.

== See also ==
- Puri
- Chapati
- Roti
