= NAWO =

NAWO or the National Alliance of Women's Organisations is a UK wide umbrella organisation dedicated to promoting women's human rights with a special focus on gender and Europe. It was founded in 1989 and has 140 members, both women's organisations and individuals based in England.

== Composition ==
NAWO is an NGO, run by a Management Committee made up of its trustees. Its membership is made up of individuals and organisations ranging for single issue to specialist groups offering services and campaigning across a broad range of women's concerns.

== Current issues ==
NAWO co-hosted a meeting with Joan Ruddock MP near Parliament Square attended by representatives of key women's organisations and female parliamentarians. The objective of this meeting was to highlight the key issues shared among women's groups and to raise these issues within government. What came out of this discussion was an idea to form a coalition of women's groups called UK Women's Voices.

They are also involved in discussions with Iraqi women's organisations and civil society groups, such as Women Living Under Muslim Laws(WLUML) who fear that the new Iraqi Constitution will erode women's rights, as the latest draft states that Sharia law will be the main source of legislation.

During 2006, before the Football World Cup in Germany, NAWO campaigned and called on football managers, players and FA officials to make a public statement condemning human trafficking, as approximately 40,000 prostitutes were expected to enter the country during the World Cup, many of whom would have been illegally trafficked into the sex industry.

NAWO annually attend and take part in the United Nations' Commission on the Status of Women at the UN headquarters in New York. They are currently lobbying on four issues: sexual offending and rape; UN Special Procedures; the trafficking of women and girls; and the UN Gender Architecture.

== Publications ==
NAWO publishes a newsletter called New Update every three months; recent topics highleighted have been Women's Human Rights, progress since the 1995 Beijing Platform for Action, Europe and gender equality, Human Trafficking, and Women and Trade. Members also receive a monthly e-bulletin keeping them updated on campaigns and progress.

== See also ==
- Neelam Chaturvedi
