= Brahmarakshasa =

Class of rakshasas in Hindu mythology

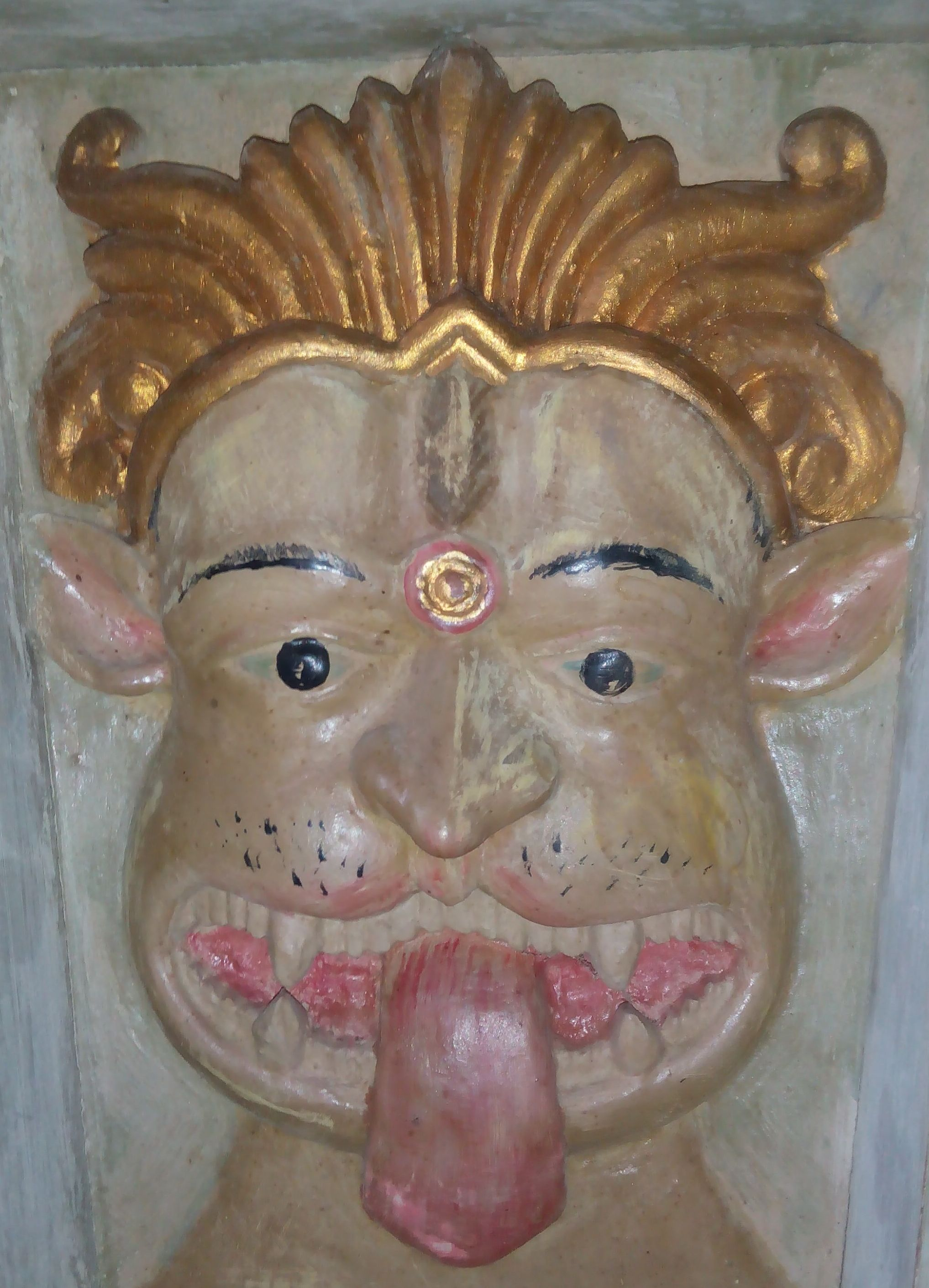
Brahmarakshasa sculpture from Maharashtra

A brahmarakshasa (Sanskrit: ब्रह्मराक्षसः, romanized: Brahmarākṣasaḥ, pronounced [brɐʰmɐraːkʂɐsɐḥ]) is one of a class of rakshasas, a race of usually malevolent beings in Hinduism. A member of the Brahmin caste who engages in unrighteous deeds is cursed to become a brahmarakshasa after his death.

== Literature ==
=== Manusmriti ===
The Manusmriti states that a Brahmin who lives a life of Adharma by performing some black magic, seduces the wives of other men, or steals the property of other Brahmins would become a brahmarakshasa following his death.

=== Puranas ===
The Brahma Purana describes a conversation between a chandala and a brahmarakshasa. When enquired regarding the sin he had committed, the brahmarakshasa revealed that he had once been a Brahmin named Somasharma. Since he had performed a sacrifice on behalf of an ostracised king, in the service of whom mantras were forbidden to be employed, he had been turned into a brahmarakshasa.

The Narada Purana describes an episode of Kalmashapada conversing with a brahmarakshasa, whose abode was a banyan tree. The brahmarakshasa told the king that he had previously been a wealthy Brahmin from the country of Magadha named Somadatta. Having mastered the Vedas, Somadatta had grown arrogant from the knowledge he had acquired and his youth, due to which he stopped heeding his preceptor. He was hence reduced to the state of a brahmarakshasa. Unable to experience happiness, he is described to consume the flesh of Brahmins and lead a life of agony.

The Skanda Purana features the legend of King Viduratha of Vidarbha. Having accidentally killed a sage during his hunt, he was forced to undertake eleven terrible births. During his seventh birth, Viduratha was born as a brahmarakshasa, possessing sharp and curved fangs, a terrible mouth, and dried-up limbs, and subsisting on a diet of flesh and blood. He was slain by King Nimi in a war with the Brahmastra.

=== Folklore ===
Brahmarakshasas were a regular feature in old Indian stories like Simhasana Dvatrimsika, Panchatantra and other old wives tales. As per these stories, brahmarakshasas were powerful enough also to grant any boon, money, gold, if they became pleased with any person. In most of the stories, they are depicted as huge, mean and fierce-looking, with two horns on their head like a rakshasa and a lock of hair like a Brahmin and usually found hanging upside down on a tree. Also a brahmarakshasas would sometimes eat human beings in stories.

It is said that the 7th century Sanskrit poet Mayurabhatta, who composed the noted Surya Sataka (one hundred verses in praise of Surya) was troubled by a brahmarakshasa while performing a penance under a peepal tree at the Deo Sun Temple located at the Aurangabad district of Bihar. According to legend, the being repeated the verses pronounced by Mayurbhatta, disturbing him. In order to get rid of him, Mayurbhatta started to pronounce his words through his nose. Since brahmarakshasas do not have a nose, it left the tree, which immediately turned dry. After the being left, Mayurbhatta could peacefully create the hundred verses in praise of Surya, which cured him of leprosy.

== Temples ==
In many Hindu temples of Maharashtra and states of South India like Kerala and Karnataka, idols of brahmarakshasas are depicted in outer walls and are generally offered puja. An oil lamp is lit on a regular basis in front of their idols.

There are many temples where the beings are venerated as demigods, like in Malliyor Temple of Kottayam. In the Kottarathil Bhagavati temple of Kerala, the shrines of the beings are located in the southern side facing the east.

According to the regional legend of the Omkareshvara Shiva temple of Madikeri, the temple is said to have been built by a king to ward off the evil caused by a brahmarakshasa.

At Shringeri, the Malayala Brahma Temple is of a brahmarakshasa.

At the complex of the Kandiyoor Shiva Temple near Mavelikkara, a separate temple exists for a brahmarakshasa.

In Njarakkal, Kerala, there exists an 800-year-old Bhagavathi temple where there are adjacent temples for Shiva, Nagaraja, and a brahmarakshasa.

In Udupi of Karnataka, there are many temples, such as one in Maranakatte, to rid possession or troubles believed to be caused by a brahmarakshasa.

== Southeast Asia ==
In countries like Thailand, Cambodia, and Java, whose cultures saw influence from Hinduism, there are shrines elevated on poles. These are erected in the neighborhood of every house for the veneration of nature spirits, some of them identified with brahmarakshasas.

== In popular culture ==
In 2014, Vikram Bhatt made India's first 3D creature horror film entitled Creature 3D in which the creature or demon is a Brahmarakshasa - a mutant from Indian mythology.

In July 2016, Zee TV announced the weekly horror based television series titled Brahmarakshas. In the 2024 film Munjya, Brahmarakshasa was mentioned as well. In the film Kantara: Chapter 1, released in 2025, Brahmarakshasa was featured.
