= Deo Fort =

Fort in India

- Deo Raj Virasat
- Location within India Location within Bihar
- 24.6589°N 84.4342°E
- Location: Deo, Bihar, India

Site notes
- Height: १५० Foot

Deo Fort is a fort situated in Aurangabad district, Bihar near the town of Deo. It was commanded by the rulers of Deo Raj who were Sisodia Rajputs, originated from Mewar during the Mughal period (16th–17th centuries). They settled in southern Bihar and took control of the region. The last king of Deo Maharaja Jagnath Singh, he had two sons. The fort is located next to Deo Sun Temple and faces northwards. The last Raja, Jagannath Prasad Singh died on 16 April 1934, younger Queen took charge after his death and ruled up to 1947.

== History ==
The Deo Fort traces its origins to the late medieval era. According to historians, in the Mughal period the Sisodia Rajputs, migrants from Mewar established themselves in the region of Deo (sometimes identified with Gaya) and founded the Deo Raj family. This family became the hereditary rulers (zamindars) of Deo, maintaining authority over the area and serving as the traditional patrons of the nearby Sun Temple. Inscriptions and later genealogies record that the Sisodia line succeeded an earlier local dynasty (sometimes associated with "Umga") through marriage alliances in the 15th century. Although the Deo Raj seat originated during Mughal rule, its rulers continued to govern through the colonial era. They generally cooperated with British authorities and did not join armed uprisings in 1781 or 1857.

By the early 20th century, the Deo Raj line concluded without a male heir. Maharaja Jagannath Prasad Singh (also known as Kinkar Singh), the last ruling chief, died in 1934. His widow then managed the estate until Indian independence in 1947. After 1947 the Zamindari system was abolished and Deo passed under the administration of the Bihar state government. Today Deo Fort stands as a ruinous relic of the Deo Raj dynasty.

== Architecture ==
The fort’s remaining structures illustrate its original defensive design. Deo Fort was built with thick stone ramparts and gateways on the hilltop. Surviving portions of the outer walls are built of coursed rubble masonry, and at least one arched entrance remains visible. Overall the architecture follows the style of later medieval Rajput forts of Bihar, massive stone walls punctuated by bastions and large arched gateways.

== Conservation and Present Status ==
Deo Fort is not listed as a centrally protected monument by the Archaeological Survey of India, and no major conservation project has been undertaken to date. The site today is largely overgrown and open to the public. Visitors can access the fort freely, and it is treated as a local tourist attraction. Because the fort’s structures have not been restored, most of what remains are its intact outer walls and the main gate, much of the interior has crumbled. However, Deo Fort retains significance as part of the Deo temple complex and Bihar’s heritage, and it is mentioned among the state’s popular historical forts.

== See also ==
- Deo Raj
- Deo, Bihar
