= Piru, Bihar =

Abu Naseerpur Piru
- Nickname: Piru
- Location in Bihar, India Abu Naseerpur Piru (India)
- Coordinates: 24.839°N 84.854°E
- Country: India
- State: Bihar
- District: Aurangabad
- Founder: Abu Nasir

Area
  - Total: 620 ha (1,500 acres)
- Elevation: 93 m (305 ft)

Population (2011)
  - Total: 8,537
  - Density: 1,400/km^{2} (3,600/sq mi)

Languages
  - common: Magahi and Hindi
- Time zone: UTC+5:30 (IST)
- PIN: 824120
- Telephone code: 06328
- ISO 3166 code: IN-BR
- Vehicle registration: BR 26
- Sex ratio: 1000:918 ♂/♀
- CONNECTIVITY TYPE STATUS (IN YEAR 2011) Public Bus Service Available within 5 - 10 km distance Private Bus Service Available within 5 - 10 km distance Railway Station Available within 10+ km distance

Piru is a village in the Aurangabad district in Bihar, India. Vaanbhat who was noble in the court of Harshvardhan belongs to Piru. According to Census 2011 information the location code or village code of Piru village is 252763. Piru village is located in Haspura subdivision of Aurangabad district in Bihar, India. It is situated 4 km away from sub-district headquarter Haspura (tehsildar office) and 60 km away from district headquarter Aurangabad. As per 2009 stats, Piru village is also a gram panchayat.

The total geographical area of village is 620 hectares. Piru has a total population of 8,537 peoples, out of which male population is 4,372 while female population is 4,165. This results in a sex ratio of approximately 952 females for every 1,000 males. Literacy rate of piru village is 57.87% out of which 66.86% males and 48.43% females are literate. There are about 1,334 houses in piru village.

Daudnagar is nearest town to piru village for all major economic activities, which is approximately 25 km away.

References Engr. Safiullah Khan Ajmeri from piru working in a Ministry of Electricity and Water Kuwait.
