= Vrati =

A vower in Hinduism

Vrati ( Devanagari: व्रती, Romanised: Vratī ) or vratin refers to a devotee or person who observes a sacred vrata in the tradition of Hinduism in the Indian subcontinent. The vrati follows the rules and procedures of the sacred vrata very strictly. The vrati observes the sacred vrata with some wishes and desires to be fulfilled by the deity of the vrata. He or she also promises to the deity some sacrifices or offerings in the return of the fulfillment of the wishes desired. The vrati observing the sacred vrata should be away from jealousy and anger. It is believed that it brings prosperity to the family.

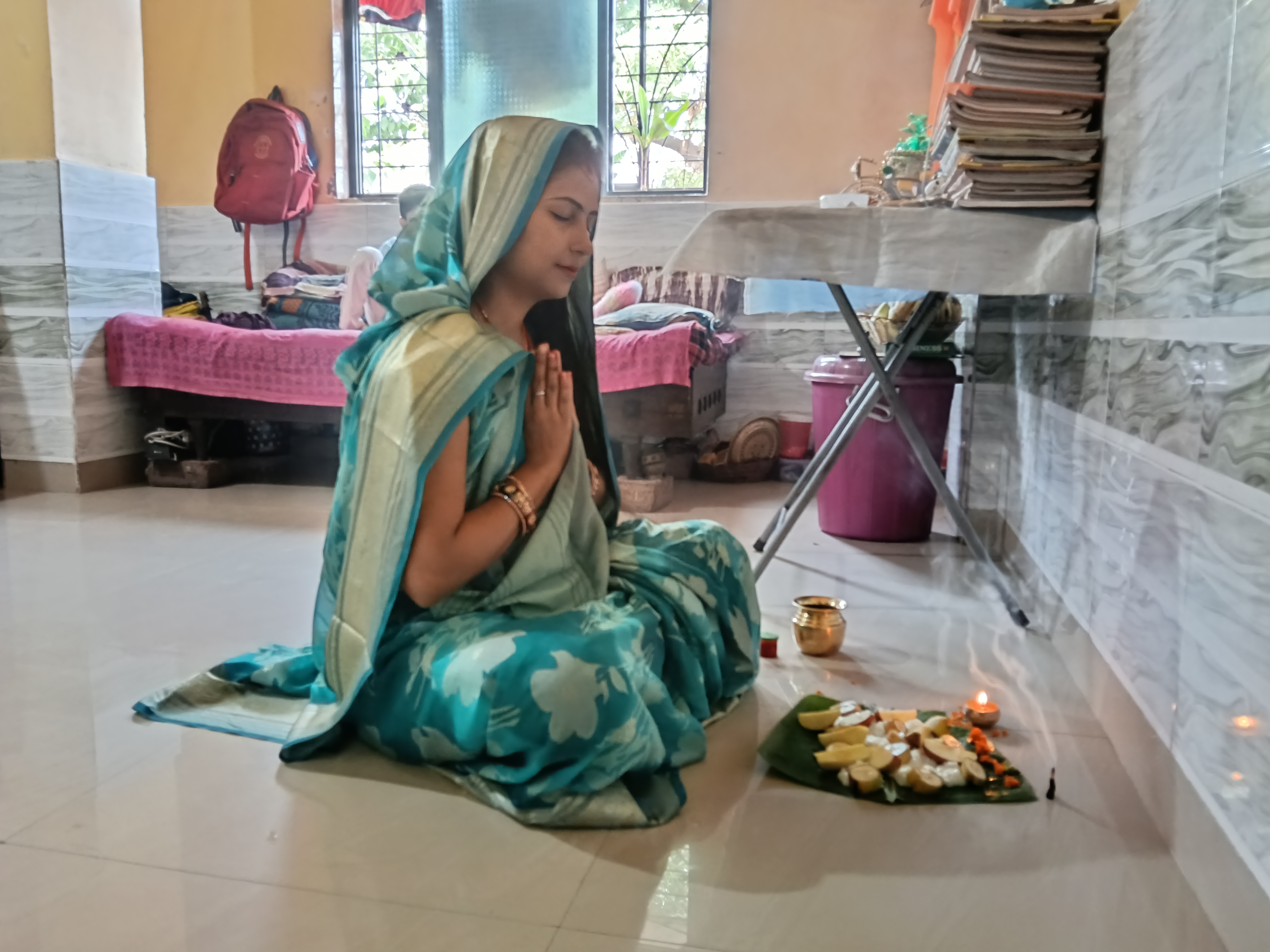
A vrati observing Raib Parva (Ravi Vrata).

== Description ==
In Hinduism, the tradition of vrati is a disciplined way of performing worship and rituals to the deities. The vrati maintains purity and sattvik during the observance of the sacred vrata.

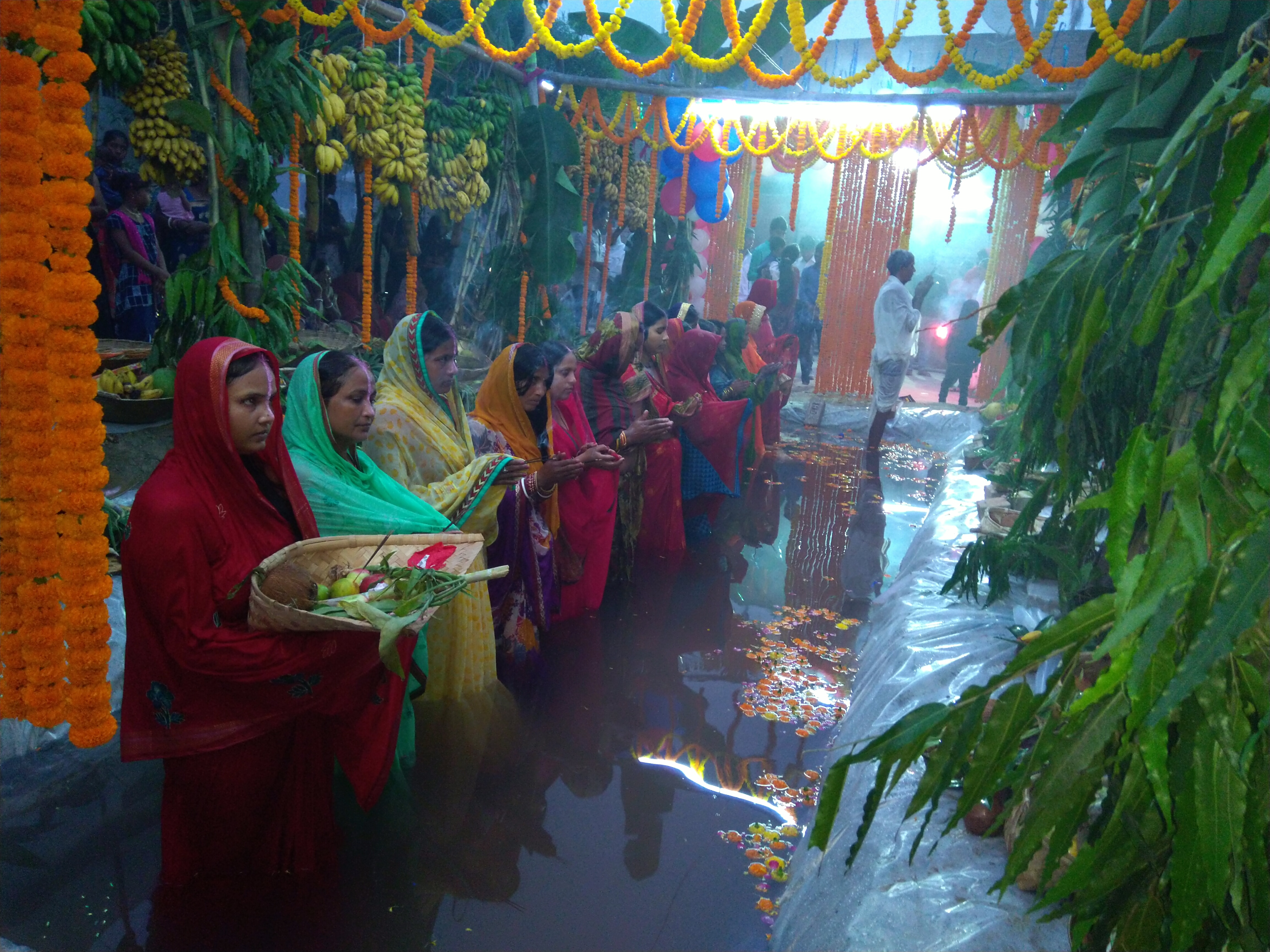
View of Chhath Puja vratis

During the observance of a vrata, the vrati first of all takes the resolution of the fasting for the vrata. In the text Kapila Purana, there is a Shloka regarding the resolution as

विघ्नराजं समर्ध्याथ एकमेश्वरसन्निधौ । यथाकामेन संकल्प्य ततः कुर्यात स वे व्रती ॥

— Kapila Purana

The rules and procedures for the fasting varies according to the vrata. These are mentioned in the Hindu scriptures. In some vratas the rules and procedures are guided by the local folk traditions.

There are several texts in Hinduism that provide the condes of conduct for a vrati. A vrati should maintain Brahmacharya during the fasting of a vrata. In this regard, it is said that just as an elephant without teeth is not befit, a warrior without hands doesn't befit, and a householder is not befit without charity. Similarly a vrati without maintaining Brahmacharya doesn't befit.
