= Déo Rian =

Brazilian musician

Déo Cesário Botelho or Déo Rian (born February 26, 1944, in Rio de Janeiro) is a Brazilian musician, composer and choro mandolinist.

He is a student of Jacob do Bandolim. In 1970 after Jacob's death, he took over his teacher's role as band leader and mandolinist in the choro orchestra Época de Ouro.

== See also ==
- Choro
