= Roshika Deo =

Fijian feminist and activist

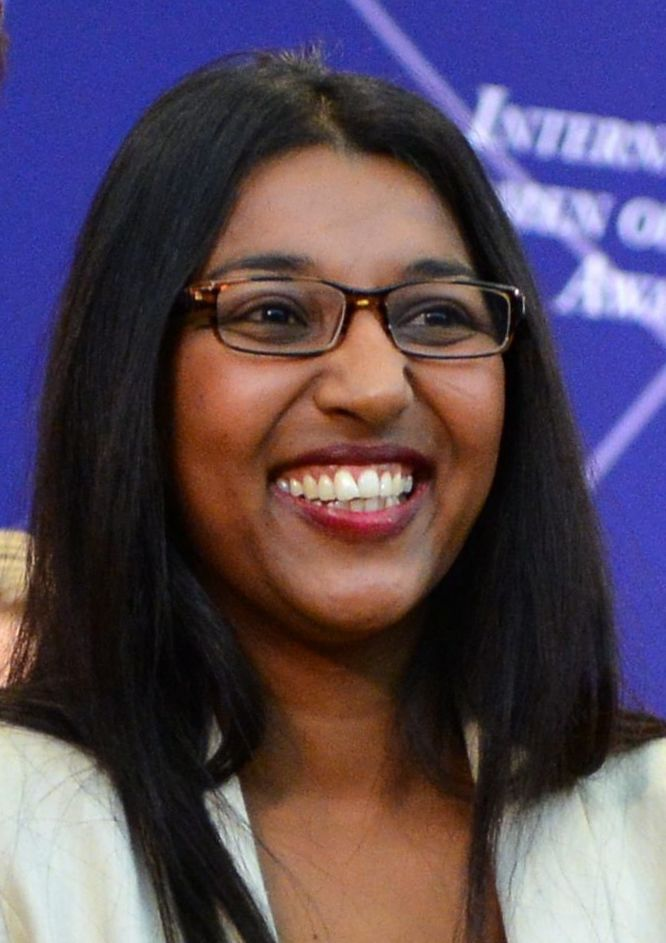
Roshika Deo, 2014

Roshika Deo is a Fijian feminist and activist. Deo started the Be The Change Campaign organization in Fiji.

== Career ==
In 2009, Deo received the Paul Harris Fellowship Award for her community service. She was also nominated for the Amnesty International Human Rights Defender Award in 2013 and received the US Secretary of State International Women of Courage Award from Michelle Obama in 2014.

Deo was an independent candidate in the 2014 general elections.

Deo established the Be The Change party.

== Personal life ==
Roshika Deo belongs to an Indo-Fijian Hindu family. Her father, Indar Deo, was a councillor, a politician for the National Alliance Party and a businessman who now lives in Australia.

Deo attended Suva Grammar School and holds a Bachelor of Laws from the University of the South Pacific (USP).

== See also ==
- Indians in Fiji
