= Neelam Jain =

Spiritual leader in Jainism

Dr. Neelam Jain
- Born: 26 August 1954 (age 72); Dehradun, Uttarakhand, India
- Education: M.K.P. Girls College, Dehradun, India; Meerut University, Meerut, India
- Occupations: Editor, poet, writer, social activist
- Spouse: Mr. U.K.Jain

Neelam Jain (born 26 August 1954) is a prominent woman in Jain society. She is the editor of Jain Mahiladarsh.

== Career ==
She is Chief editor for the Shree Deshana. She is a research officer in Sahitya Bharati Shodh Sansthan. She is General Secretary of Sewayatan, Shri Sammedshikhar Ji. She is Founder of VAMA Jain Mahila Mandal, Gurgaon. Neelam Jain is presently working for the overall development of the Sarak community in Bengal, Bihar and Orissa. She has been invited more than 1000 conferences worldwide as chief guest or as Main Speaker. She spread the Jain religion concepts all over the world. She has given more than 100 talks on different radio and TV channels (Aastha, Sanskar, Jain TV .. etc.). She is nominated State coordinator (Maharashtar, state) by National Minority Commission for Educational institutions, Govt. of India, New Delhi.She is visiting scholar SJSU (America ) .

== Recognition ==
- George Bernard Shaw Memorial Honour (1994)
- Dr. Laxmi Narain Award (1994)
- CHANDMAL Saraogi Gauhati Award (1994)
- Shrut Shri Award (1995)
- Dr. Ambedkar fellowship (1996)
- Sahitya-Sri (1997)
- Sahitya-Saraswati (1998)
- Sahitya Shiromani (1999)
- Saraswat Samman (1999)
- Acharya VidyaSagar Award (1995)
- Mahavir Award (1995)
- Special Writer & Social Worker Award (1997)
- Sarjan Award (1997)
- Sahu RamaDevi Award (1999)
- Jain Jyotsana (2000)
- Mahila-Ratna (2001)
- Shrawika Ratan Samman (2001)
- Mahila-Gaurav (2003)
- Maa-Jinvani Award (2009)
- Vishav Maitri Samman (2009)
- Guru -Ashish Samman (2005)
- Saraswat Samman (2012)
- Aksharabhindan Samman (2012)
- Stri Shakti samman (2015 )naari ratan (2023)

girnar gaurav award acharya shantisagar award (2022)

- sawyambhu puruskar (2016 )

== Publication ==
- Sarak Kshetra ( Hindi)
- Mautti Mai Band Asmita ( Hindi)
- Samaaj Nirmaan Mai Mahilao Ka Yogdan ( Hindi )
- Man Mai Dharo Namokar ( Hindi)
- Maati Ka Saurabh ( Hindi )
- Namokar ( Barel Language For Blind )
- Dhumrapan – Zahar Hi Zahar ( Hindi )
- Sabhyata Ke Unnayak Bhagwan Rishabdev ( Hindi )
- Mile Sur Mera Tumhara ( Hindi )
- December Ke Digamber ( Hindi )
- Jain Varta ( Hindi )
- Tatvartha Surta : Ek Samajik Addhayan ( Hindi )
- Jain Loksahitya Main Nari (Hindi)
- Jain Religion and Science (English)

prakrit bhasha me ramkatha mookmati me kala aur vigyan
