= Neelam Ibrar Chattan =

Pakistani campaigner for human rights

Neelam Ibrar Chattan (born 1994) is a Pakistani campaigner for human rights. She won the European Union - Paiman Trust Gold Award for her work. She educates for children's rights and human rights in the war-torn Swat Valley, Pakistan. She shares her hometown with Malala Yousafzai.
