= Harsh Deo Malaviya =

Indian economist and journalist

- Born: October 1917; Allahabad
- Died: January 1989 (aged 71)
- Occupation: Author

Harsh Deo Malaviya (1917–1989) was a journalist and economist with socialist ideas. He participated in the Quit India Movement and was imprisoned several times. He was a close associate of Acharya Narendra Dev.

He authored a number of books on articles on land reforms, non-alignment, Indo-African issues and world peace. He represented the State of Uttar Pradesh in Rajya Sabha from 1972 to 1978.

== Bibliography ==
- Socialist Ideology of Congress. A Study in Its Evolution. (1966)
- Indian National Congress: A Brief History (1974)
