= Akanksha Deo Sharma =

Indian designer

- Born: New Delhi, India
- Education: National Institute of Fashion Technology
- Occupations: industrial designer; textile innovator; visual artist
- Years active: 2016–present
- Organization: IKEA

Akanksha Deo Sharma is an Indian industrial designer, textile innovator and visual artist. Her works combine Indian textile history, handicrafts and construction techniques to develop a minimalist, playful outcome. In 2020 she was ranked #8 in Forbes India 30 Under 30 list. She is the only woman from India working with IKEA, a Dutch-based Swedish multinational group.

== Early life ==
Akanksha Deo Sharma studied commerce and before attending the National Institute of Fashion Technology in New Delhi. After her graduation in 2016, she went to Sweden for a 10-month internship. She works in Gurugram for IKEA.

== Recognition ==
- Elle Decor India Best Designer Award 2009
