= Neelam Chaturvedi =

Indian human rights activist (born 1960)

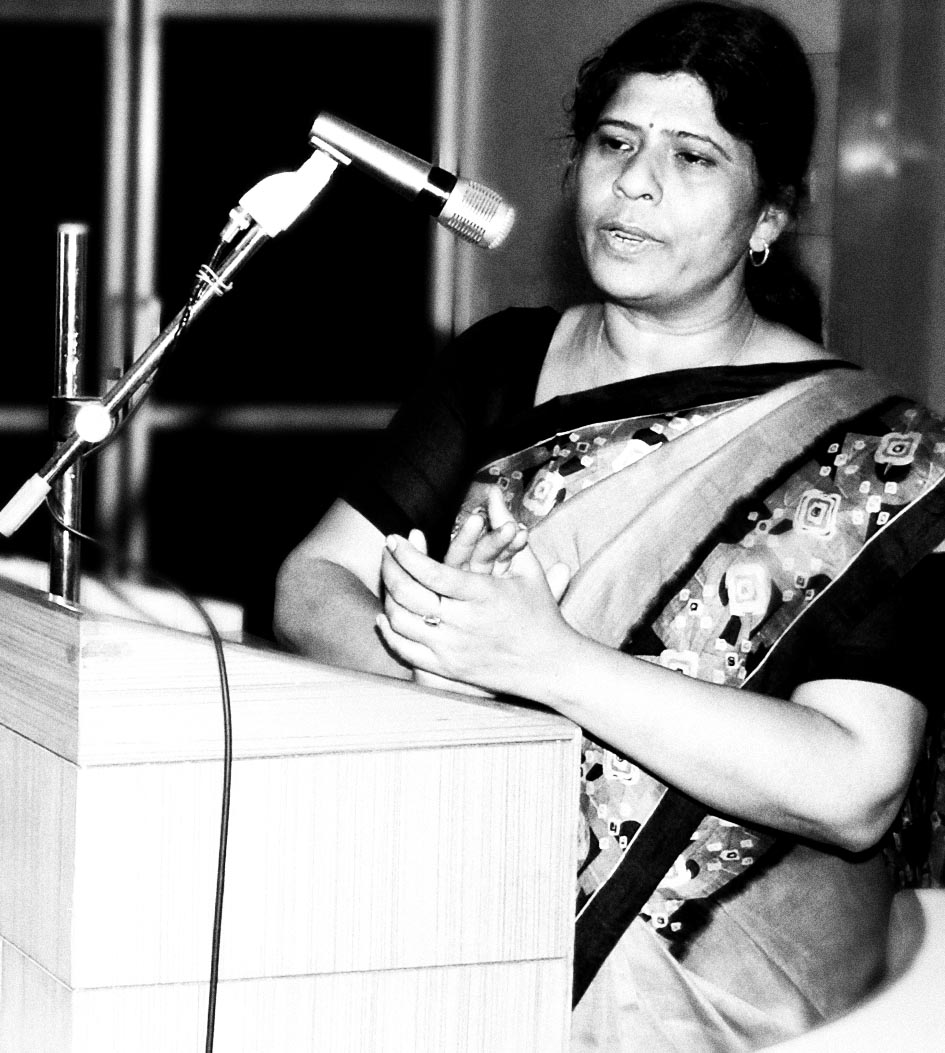

Neelam Chaturvedi (b. 1 July 1960 at Kanpur, Uttar Pradesh) is an Indian women's human rights defender and activist.

She works to create awareness about gender and caste violence in India and build networks to combat violence against women. She seeks to increase women's ability to participate in democratic institutions through capacity building and promote rehabilitation and counselling services for street children and children involved in child labour. She founded the first women's shelter in her region and campaigns against violence and sexual harassment of women in her community. Her work for women's rights has been highlighted by Amnesty International.

As a trade union activist in the 1970s she became involved in work on women's issues within the trade union movement and in Indian society as a whole. She organised women workers to raise issues of physical and mental violence, the dowry system, rape, prostitution and sexual harassment.

She is the founder or co-founder of Indian women's organizations including Mahila Manch, Sakhi Kendra and the National Alliance of Women's Organisations.

She is a core member of the National Alliance of Women's Organisations (NAWO) and a leader of the Opposition (for the Democratic Party) in the NAWO's Indian Women's Parliament.
