= Chhath =

Hindu festival

Chhath Puja
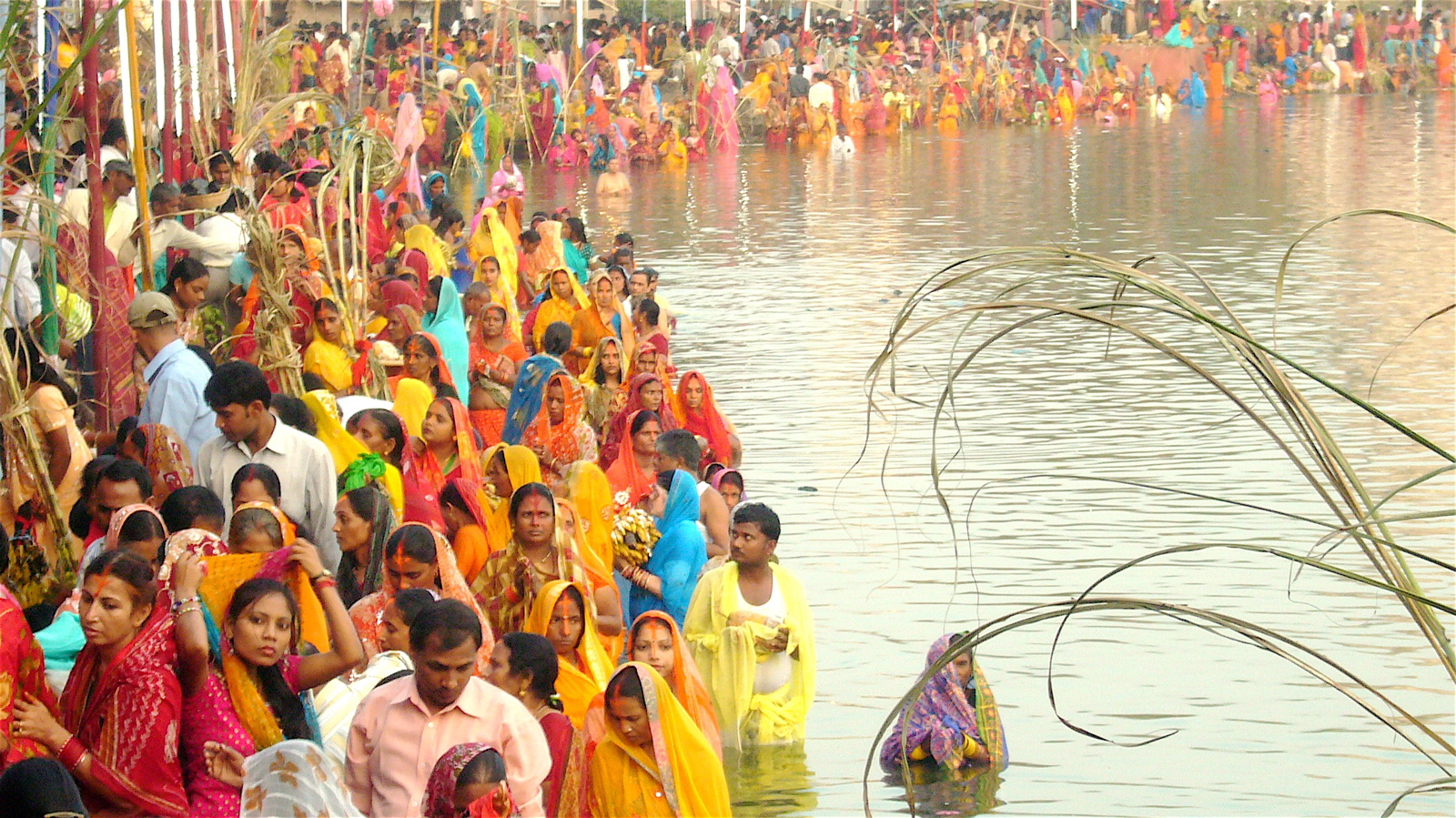
- Devotees gathered at a pond to worship the sun god Surya and his sister Chhathi Maiya in Janakpurdham, Madhesh Province, Nepal (2008)
- Also called: Chhaith; Chhath Parva; Chhath Puja; Dala Chhath; Dala Puja; Surya Shashthi
- Observed by: Indians and Nepalese: Maithils, Bhojpuriyas, Magahis and Tharus
- Type: Cultural, historical, religious
- Significance: Veneration of the sun god Surya and his sister Chhathi Maiya
- Date: 13 November – 16 November (2026)
- Duration: 4 days
- Frequency: Annual

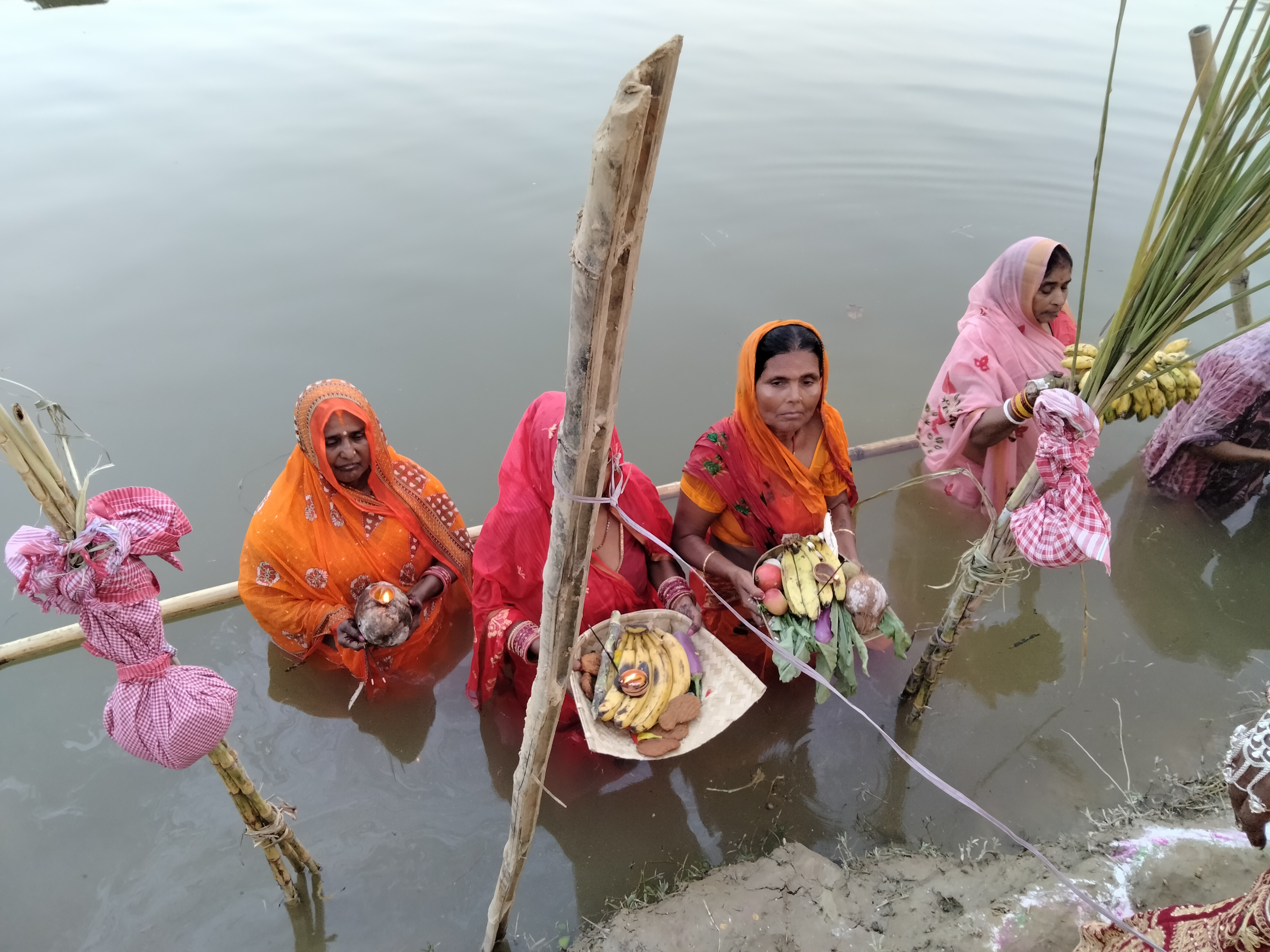
Chhath Puja at Chaudhary Pokhar in Basuki Bihari town of Bihar

Chhath Puja, also known as Chhaith Puja in Maithili, is an ancient Hindu festival deeply rooted in the cultural traditions of the Indo-Nepalese region, particularly Bihar, Jharkhand and eastern Uttar Pradesh in India, as well as the Terai-Madhesh and Mithila regions of Nepal. It is primarily celebrated in the Indian state of Bihar, Jharkhand, eastern Uttar Pradesh, south-western parts of West Bengal; and Koshi, Gandaki, Bagmati, Lumbini, and Madhesh provinces of Nepal and some parts of Bangladesh In major urban centres like Delhi, Mumbai, Kolkata, Janakpur, and Kathmandu, the diaspora celebrates Chhath to preserve their cultural heritage. The festival is also celebrated by the diaspora in countries such as the United States, Australia, Singapore, Malaysia, the United Arab Emirates, Canada, Mauritius, Japan, and the United Kingdom.

During Chhath Puja, prayers are dedicated to the solar deity, Surya, to express gratitude for the blessings of life on Earth and to seek the fulfilment of personal wishes. The Hindu goddess Chhathi Maiya (or Chhathi Mata)—the sixth form of Prakriti and Surya's sister—is also worshipped during the festival. It is celebrated for six days after Deepavali or Tihar, until the sixth day of the lunar month of Kartika (October or November) in the Hindu calendar (Vikram Samvat), which is why it is called 'Surya Shashti Vrata'. The rituals are observed over three nights and four days, and include holy bathing, fasting, abstaining from drinking water as a vrata (devotion), standing in water, and offering prasada (prayer offerings of food) and arghya to the rising and setting of the Sun. Some devotees also perform a prostration march as they head towards the riverbanks. All devotees prepare similar prasada and offerings.

== Traditional food and offerings ==
Chhath Puja is also marked by the preparation and offering of a variety of traditional and sattvic (pure and vegetarian) dishes that are cooked without onion or garlic. These food items hold cultural and religious importance, often passed down through generations.

Four of the most important traditional prasadas (offerings) offered during Chhath Puja are:

1. Thekua – A crispy, sweet snack made from wheat flour, jaggery, and ghee, then deep-fried. Thekua is the most iconic offering of Chhath Puja.
2. Rasabali – A traditional dessert made from flattened rice soaked in sweetened milk, flavored with cardamom and dry fruits.
3. Kasar (Laddoo) – Made with powdered rice or wheat flour and jaggery, these laddoos are shaped into small balls and are considered a holy offering.
4. Rice Laddu (Peethha) – A steamed or fried dumpling filled with jaggery and coconut, especially common in Bihar and Eastern UP.

These recipes are not only offerings but also symbolize purity, devotion, and cultural richness associated with the Chhath festival.

== Significance ==
Worship of the personification of Lord Suryanarayana at Jesal Chowpatty, Bhayandar on the occasion of Chhath Puja.

Chhath Puja is dedicated to Surya, the Sun God, as it is thought that the sun is visible to every being and is the basis of life of all creatures on Earth. Chhathi Maiya (or Chhathi Mata) is also worshipped on this day. According to Vedic astrology, Chhathi Maiya grants children long life and good health by shielding them from illnesses and diseases.

== Description ==
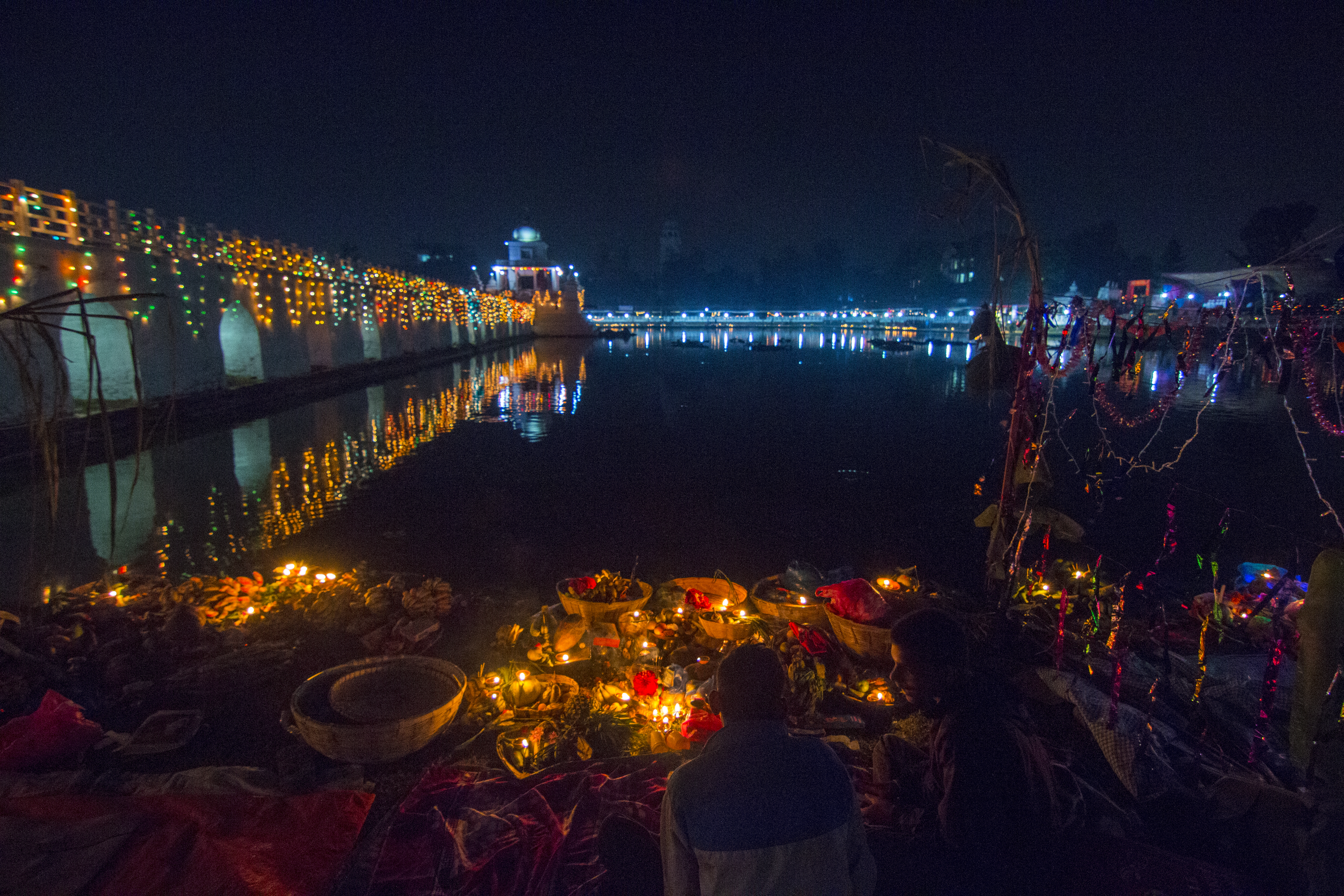
Chhath celebration (2015) at Rani Pokhari, a 17th-century pond in Kathmandu

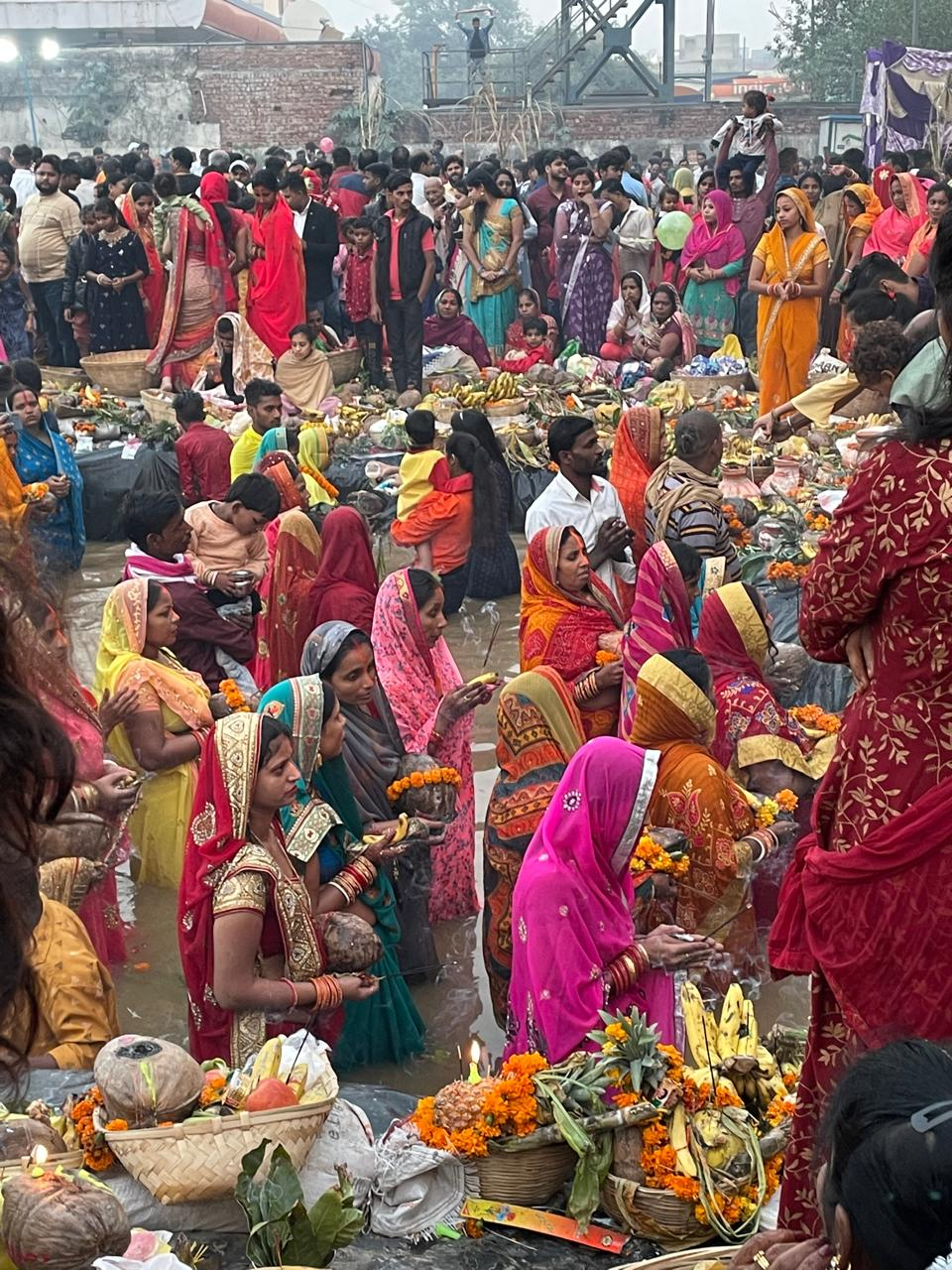
Chhath celebrations happening at a temporary pond made for devotees in Shahdara, Delhi

Chhath Puja is a folk festival that lasts four days. It starts with Kartik Shukla Chaturthi and ends with Kartik Shukla Saptami. Chhath is celebrated twice a year:

1. Chaiti Chhath – observed in the Chaitra month of Vikram Samvat.
2. Kartik Chhath – celebrated at a very large scale in the Kartika month of Vikram Samvat.

The main worshippers, called parvaitin (transl. 'devotees', from Sanskrit parva, meaning 'occasion' or 'festival'), are usually women. However, men also observe this festival as Chhath is not a gender-specific festival. The parvaitin pray for the well-being of their family, and for the prosperity of their children.

=== Nahaay khaay (day 1) ===
On the first day of Chhath Puja, the parvaitin must take a holy bath, after which the entire house, its surroundings, and pathways to the ghat are thoroughly cleaned. Parvaitin usually cook sattvik lauki bhaat (bottle gourd and Bengal gram lentil, with Arva rice), which is served in the afternoon to the deity as bhog (consecrated food). This initiates the festival. The food is then eaten by the parvaitin to protect the mind from thoughts of vengeance; it is the parvaitin's the last meal during the festival.

=== Kharna / Rasiaav-roti / Lohanda (day 2) ===
Kharna, also known as Rasiaav-roti or Lohanda, is the second day of Chhath Puja. On this day, as an act of worship, devotees do not drink even a single drop of water. In the evening, they eat gur ke kheer (kheer made of jaggery), called rasiaav, together with roti or sohari.

A vrati performing Kharna Puja and offering gur kheer prasad.

=== Sandhya arghya (day 3) ===
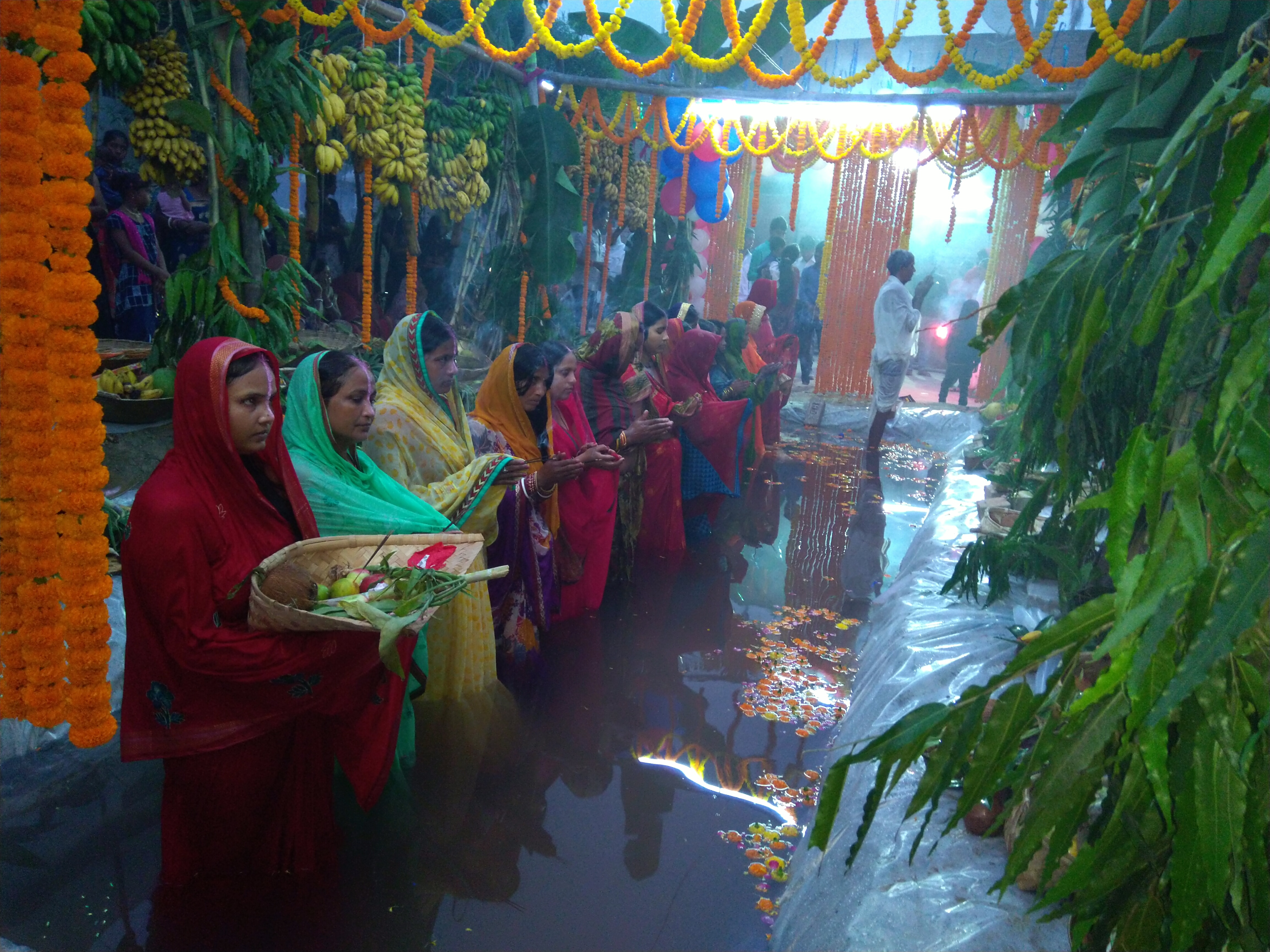
Indoor setup used for offerings

This day is spent by preparing the prasada (food offerings) at home, which often consist of thekua (cookies), rice laddu sweets, khajuria, tikri, kasar, and fruits (mainly sugarcanes, sweet lime, coconut, banana, and seasonal fruits) offered in small bamboo baskets. The food is strictly vegetarian and is cooked without salt, onions, or garlic. Emphasis is placed on maintaining the purity of the food.

In the evening, the entire household accompanies the devotee to a riverbank, pond, or other large body of water to make the arghya offerings to the setting sun. Where there is no river or pond, an indoor setup such as a tank or fountain is used. In certain places there are restrictions on using beaches for puja. Besides the devotees and their friends and family, other participants and onlookers help and receive the worshipper's blessings.

When making arghya, Gangajal water is offered to Surya, and Chhathi Maiya is worshipped with the prasada. After the worship of the Sun God, participants sing Chhath songs in the night and read the Vrat katha.

After returning home, devotees perform the ritual of kosi bharai together with other family members. They tie together 5–7 sugarcanes to form a mandap beneath which 12–24 diya (lamps) are burnt and thekua and seasonal fruits are offered. The same ritual is repeated the next morning between 3 am and 4 am, and afterward the devotees offer arghya or other offerings to the rising sun.

=== Usha arghya (day 4) ===
At dawn on the last day of Chhath Puja, worshippers travel to the riverbank to offer arghya to the rising sun. After making this holy offering, parents pray to Chhatti Maiya for their child's protection as well as the happiness and peace of their whole family. After worship, followers participate in the Paran or Parana rite, completion of their fast with a small amount of prasada and water. This rite emphasises the connection between family well-being and divine favours, serving as a symbol of thanksgiving and spiritual closure.

=== Rituals and traditions ===
In some communities, once a family member starts performing Chhath Puja, they are duty-bound to perform it every year and to pass it on to the following generations. The festival is skipped only if there is a death in the family that year. If the person stops performing the ritual on any particular year, it stops permanently and one cannot resume it. In other communities, this is not mandatory.

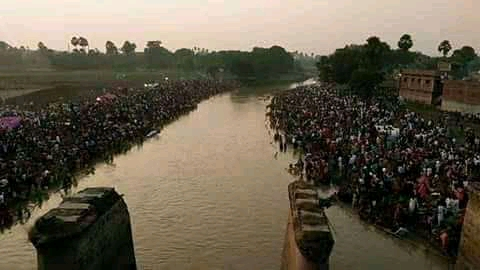
Chhath celebration at Gangi River in Arrah

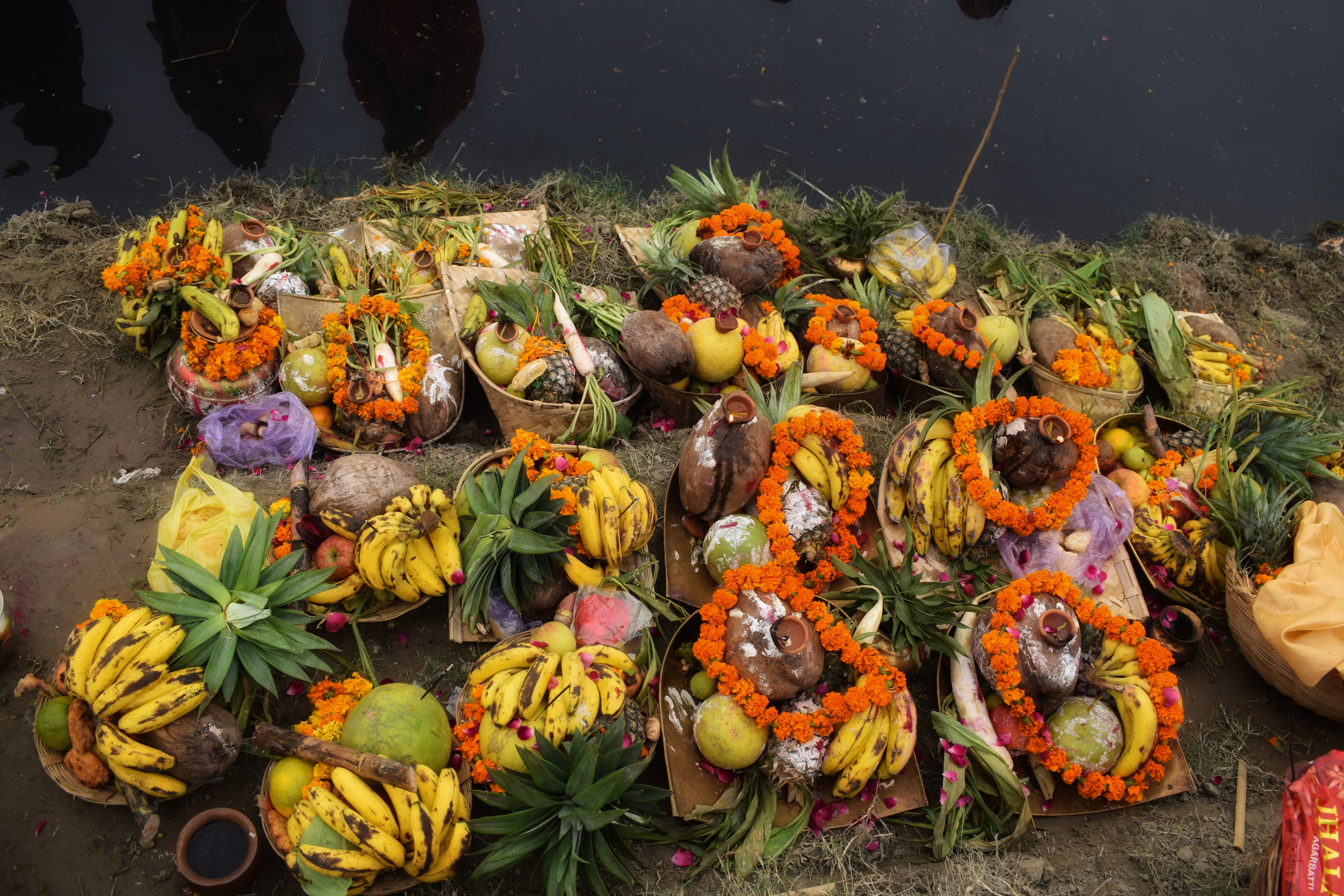
Chhath Puja worship material

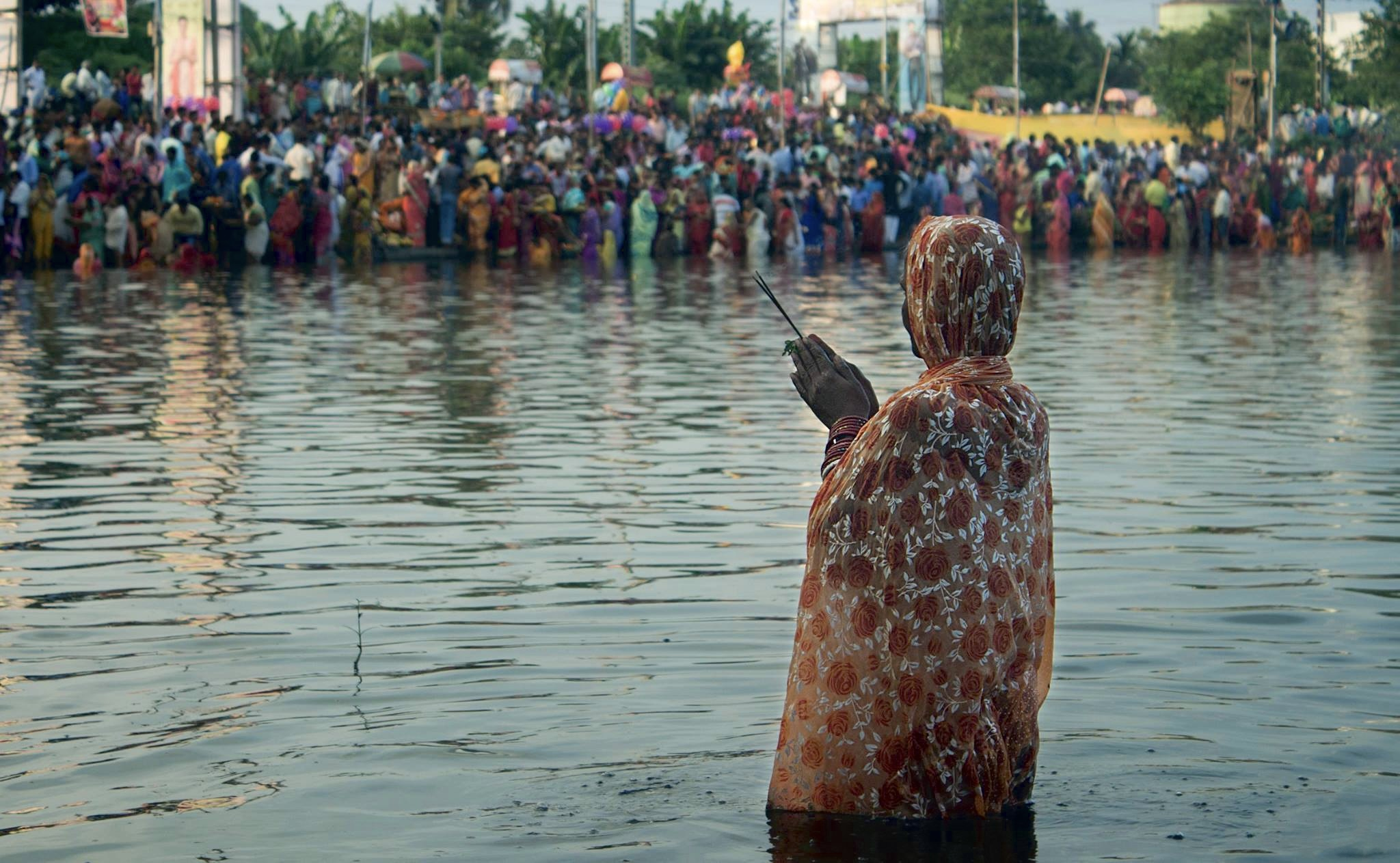
Woman praying during Chhath

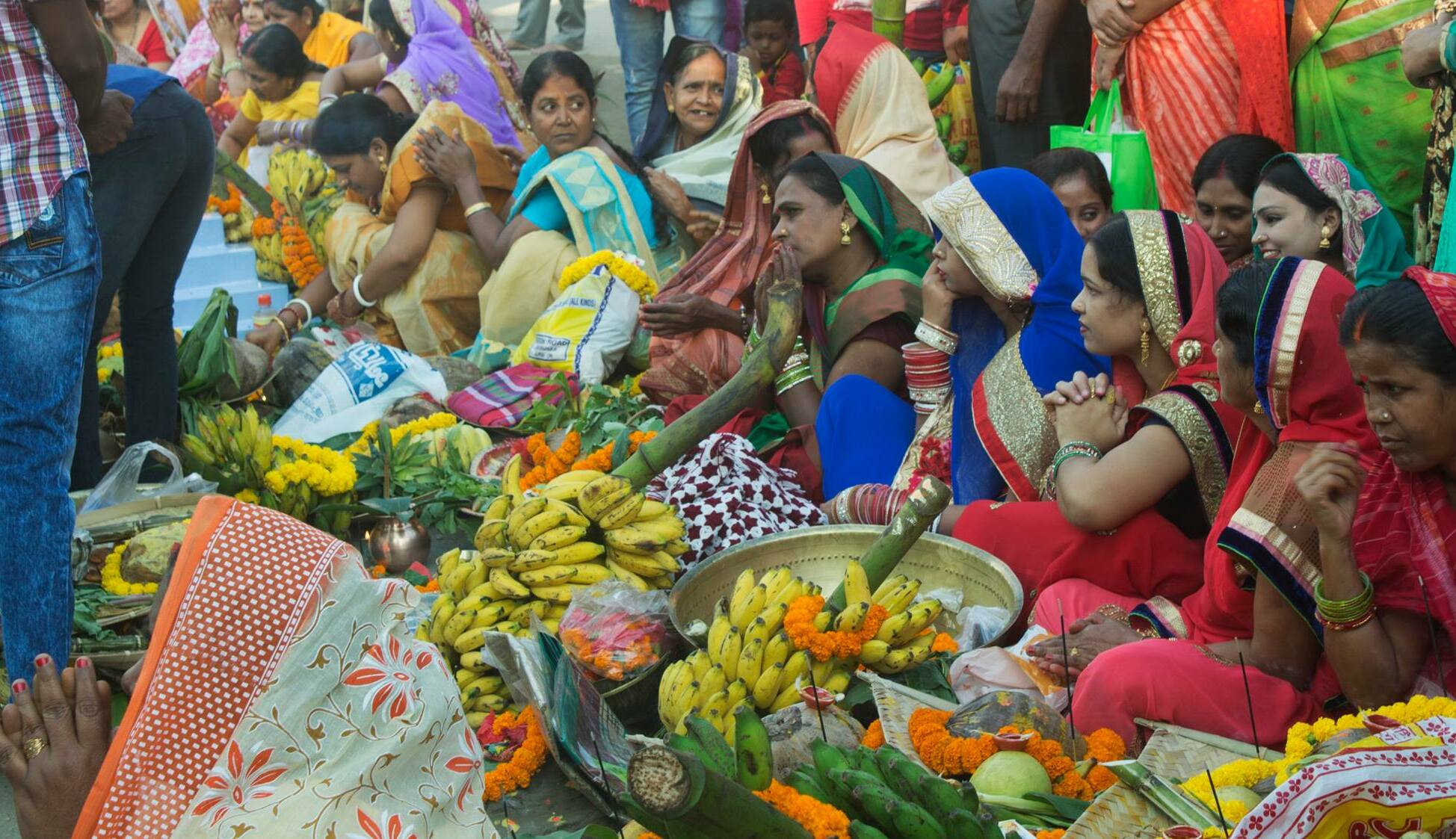
Women waiting with prasada for offerings

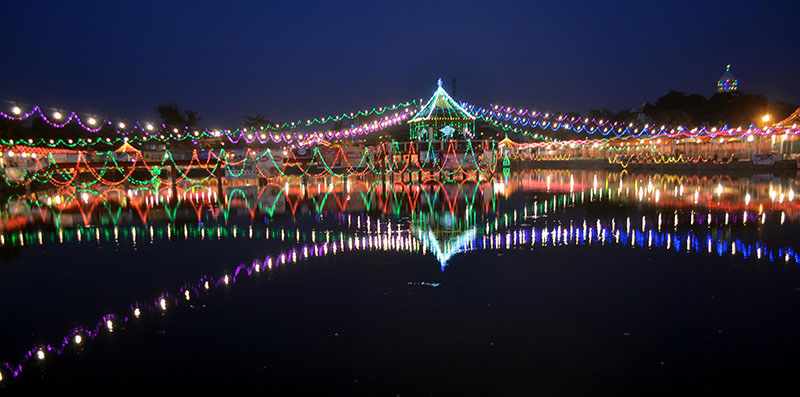
View of decorated Ghadiarwa pond on the occasion of Chhath festival, Birgunj, Nepal

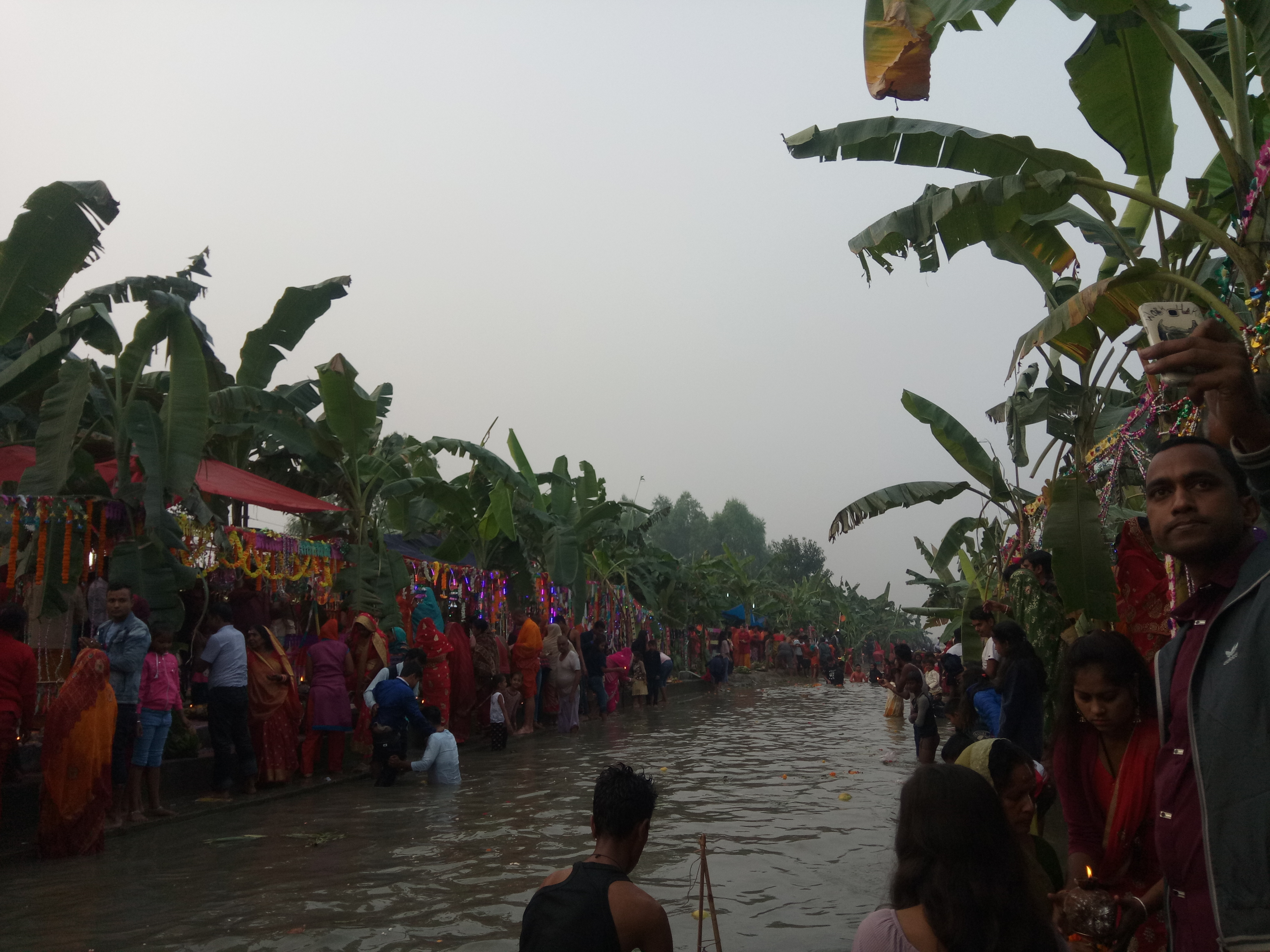
Chhath Puja at Inaruwa, Sunsari District, Koshi Province

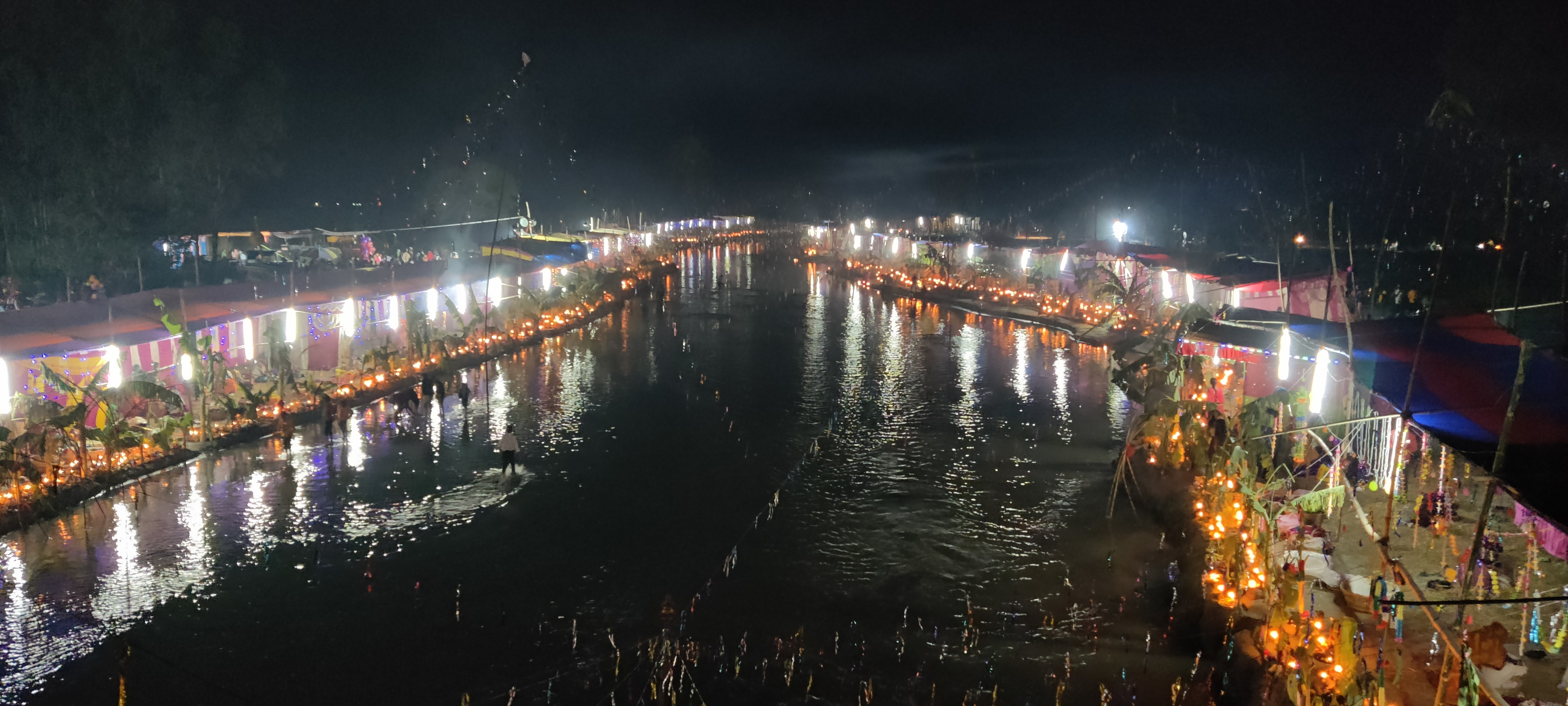
Sandhya Ghat at Jhim River, located between Malangwa and Bhelhi, Sarlahi

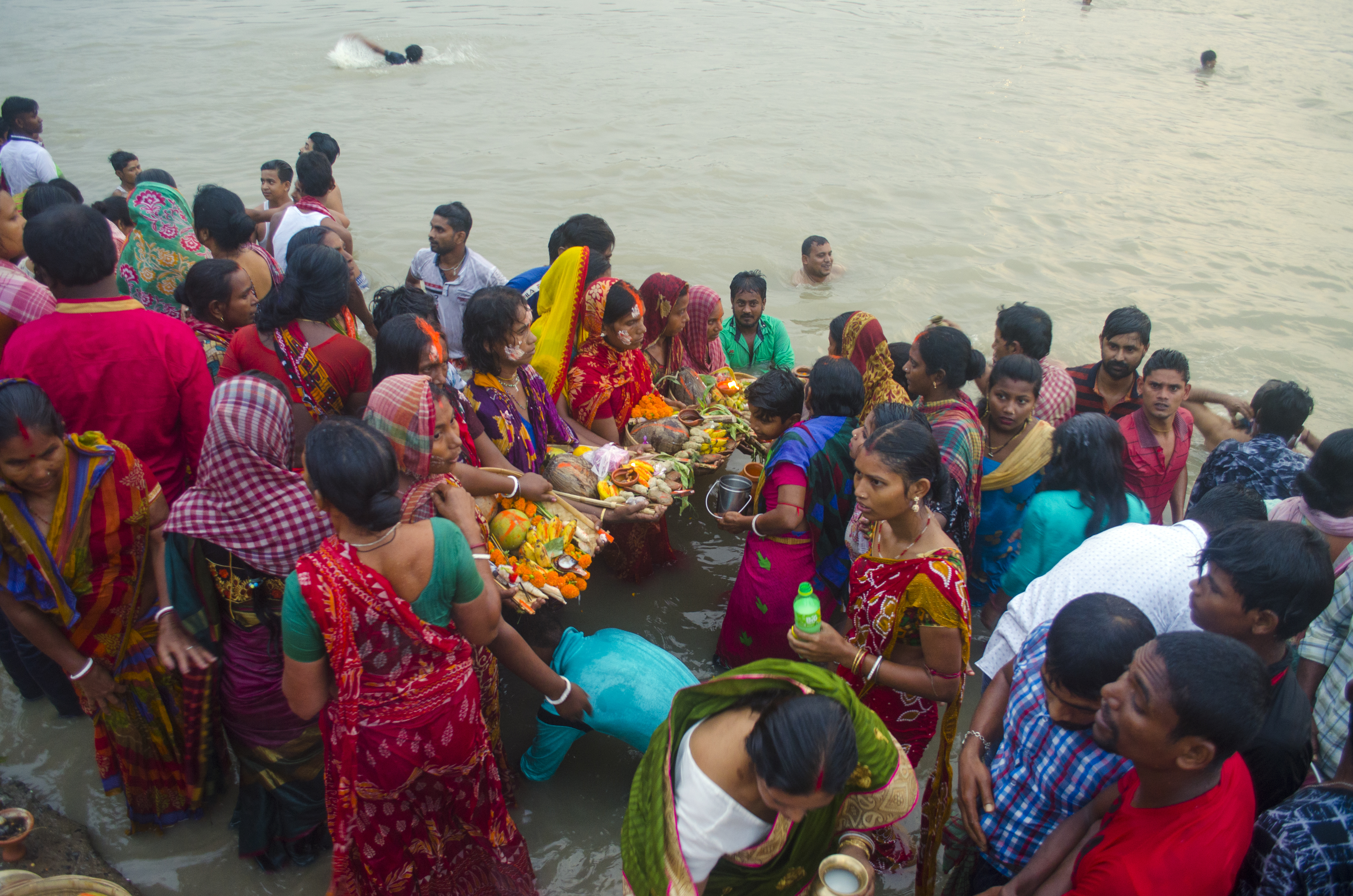
Chhath Puja celebration at Azimganj

A Magahi Kharna song sung during Chhath Puja

A Magahi Chhath Puja song

== History and associated legends ==
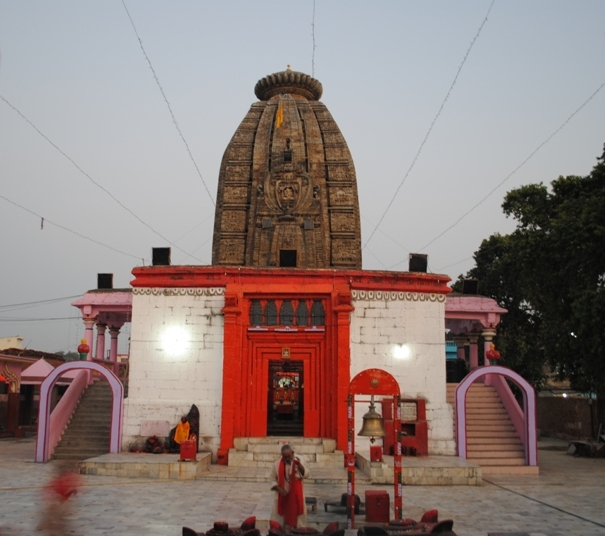
Deo Surya Mandir in Deo, Bihar, India

Chhath has been mentioned in both the major Indian epics. In the Ramayana, when Lord Rama and Mata Sita returned to Ayodhya, people celebrated Deepavali, and on its sixth day the Ramarajya (lit. 'Kingdom of Rama') was established. On this day Rama and Sita fasted, and Surya Shashthi and Chhath Puja was performed by Mata Sita. Hence, she was blessed with Lava and Kusha as sons.

In Champaran (Bihar, India) and Madhesh Province (Nepal), it is a belief that after leaving Ayodhya, Sita stayed in Valmiki Ashram located on the edge of the Narayani (Gandaki) river in Chitwan district, on the India–Nepal border. During that time, she celebrated Chhath Mahaparva in Nepal.

In the Mahabharata, Chhath Puja was performed by Kunti after she (and the Pandavas) escaped from Lakshagriha. It is also believed that Karna, the son of Surya and Kunti, was conceived after Kunti performed Chhath Puja. Draupadi is also said to have performed the Puja for the Pandavas to win the Kurukshetra War. It is believed that Draupadi performed Chhath Puja near a spring in Nagdi village of Ranchi. In this village today, the festival is performed near this spring, not the river or pond.

The Brahma Vaivarta Purana mentions that Chhathi Maiya is worshipped during the Chhath festival. It says that the Chhath Puja was started in the holy city of Varanasi by the Gahadavala dynasty. According to the Kashi Khanda, the trend of Chhath Puja spread from Varanasi to elsewhere in the country.

According to another legend, King Priyavrata, son of first Manu Svayambhu, was unhappy because he had no children. To remedy this, Kashyapa asked him to do a yajna. Shortly after, a son was born to Queen Malini; however, the baby was born dead. Following the stillbirth, the king and his family were heartbroken. Finding sympathy for the royal family, Mata Shashthi revealed herself in the sky. When the king prayed to her, she spoke, saying: "I am Chhathi Maiya the sixth form of Prakriti. I protect all the children of the world and give the blessings of children to all childless parents." After this, the goddess blessed the lifeless child with her hands, so that he came to life. Thankful for Shashthi Devi's grace, the king worshipped the goddess. It is believed that after this puja, this festival became a worldwide celebration.

It is also believed that there was an ashram (hermitage) of the rishi Kashyapa and Aditi in the Buxar region. Mata Aditi gave birth to Surya as a son on the sixth day of Kartika. Surya is also called Aditya because he is the son of Aditi. For this reason, Chhath Puja is celebrated as the birth anniversary of Surya and the month of Kartika is considered a holy month throughout the year.

In Munger region, the festival is known for its association with Sita manpatthar (or Sita Charan; lit. 'Sita's footsteps'). It is believed that the goddess Sita performed Chhath festival in Munger. Sitacharan Temple, situated on a boulder in the middle of the Ganges River in Munger, is the main center of public faith regarding the Chhath festival.

In the last few decades, the Howrah district of West Bengal has been celebrating the Chhath puja with great enthusiasm. Some of the famous Chhath ghats in West Bengal are Ramkestopur Ghat, Katliya Chhath Ghat, Jagacha Press Quarter Lake (Chhath Ghat) and Japanigate Chhath Ghat.
