= Neelam Deo =

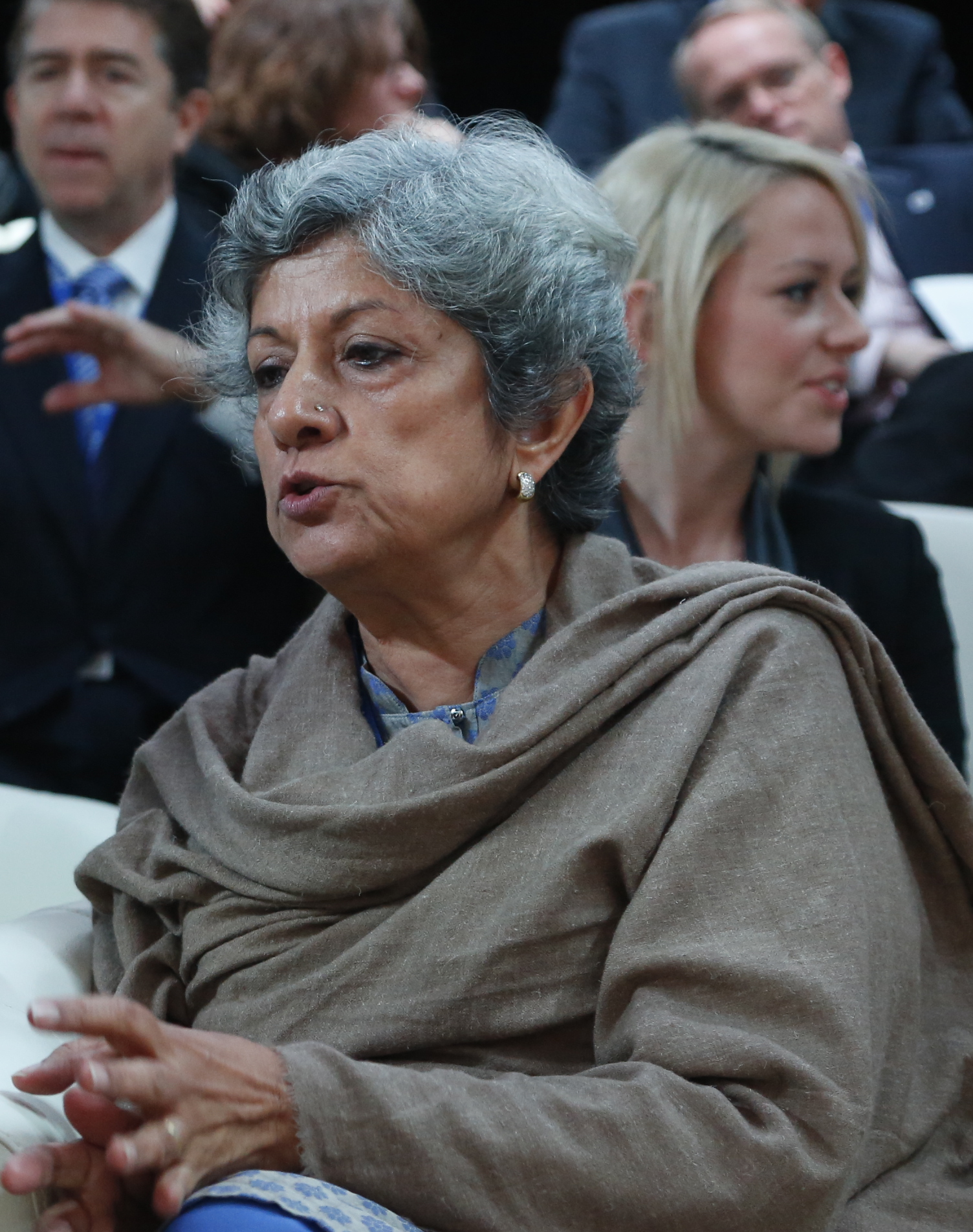
Deo at the Halifax International Security Forum in 2012

Neelam Deo is a 1975 batch Indian Foreign Service (IFS) officer who served as India's Ambassador to Denmark and Côte d'Ivoire, with concurrent accreditation to Sierra Leone, Niger & Guinea.

During her career, she was posted in the U.S. on two occasions – in Washington, DC (1992–1995) and in New York (2005–2008). As Consul General in New York, she was engaged in investment promotion activities.

After serving 33 years in the IFS, she co-founded Gateway House: Indian Council on Global Relations in 2009. She is also a distinguished fellow with the Centre for Air Power Studies, an advisor to The Climate Group – a consultancy for sustainable development – and sits on the board of Breakthrough, a human rights organization.

== Education ==
Neelam Deo completed her master's degree in Economics from the Delhi School of Economics. Prior to joining the IFS, she taught Economics at Kamla Nehru College, Delhi University from 1971-1974. She, in particular, has extensive knowledge and exposure to issues of Africa, South East Asia, India-U.S. bilateral relations, Bangladesh and other SAARC neighbours.

== Diplomatic career ==
She began her career with the IFS in Italy (1977–1980). Her subsequent postings included responsibility as a political and press officer in Thailand (1984–1987). During her assignments in the Ministry of External Affairs, she was Joint Secretary for Bangladesh, Sri Lanka, Myanmar and the Maldives. She was earlier appointed as an Ambassador to Denmark (1996–99), and then as Ambassador to Côte d'Ivoire (1999–2002), with concurrent accreditation to Sierra Leone, Niger & Guinea. Her last assignment (2005–08) was as Consul General in New York. Liaison with the U.S. Congress, think tanks and universities in the U.S., on strategic issues was among her special responsibilities.

== Publication and appearances ==
She is a frequent commentator on issues that involve India's economic emergence, diaspora and global politics. Her articles have appeared in various publications – Gateway House, Newsweek, rediff.com, and Pragati. Apart from appearing on broadcast media, such as the BBC, CNN-IBN, Mrs. Deo has also been invited to speak at many public events.

== Personal life ==
Neelam Deo is married to Pramod Deo, an officer of the Indian Administrative Service who was formerly Chairman of the Central Electricity Regulatory Commission. They have one daughter, Nandini Deo, who is an Associate Professor of Political Science at Lehigh University, Pennsylvania.
