= Kishorpura =

Village in Rajasthan, India

Coordinates: 28.1095375°N 75.5945205°E

Kishorpura is a village in Chirawa tehsil of Jhunjhunu district, Rajasthan, India.
