= Deo, Bihar =

Deo
- Town
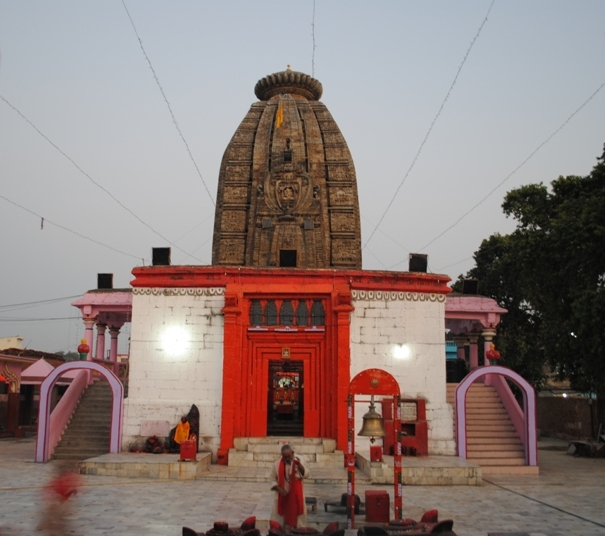
- Deo Sun Temple

- Location in Bihar, India
- Coordinates: 24.6582687°N 84.4206645°E
- Country: India
- State: Bihar
- District: Aurangabad 1973 - Now
- Block: Deo (community development block)
- Subdistrict: Aurangabad
- Division: Magadh
- Established: N/A (Deo town was State before India Independence)
- Founder: King of Deo Town
- Named for: DEO

Government
  - Body: MLA
  - Rank: 2
- Elevation: 89 m (292 ft)

Population (2011)
  - Total: 17,162
- Time zone: UTC+5:30 (IST)
- PIN: 824202

Deo also known as Dev is a city council, town and a notified area in Deo, Block of Aurangabad district in the Indian state of Bihar. Deo is located 10 km to the southeast of District Administrative Aurangabad Bihar.

== Geography ==
Deo is located at 24.39°N 84.26°E It has an average elevation of 89 metres (291 feet).

== Demographics ==
As of 2001 India census, Deo had a population of 173,216. Males constitute 89,280 of the population and females 83,936. Deo has an average literacy rate of 89%, more than the national average of 59.5%: male literacy is 75%, and female literacy is 61%. In Deo, 29% of the population is under 6 years of age. Total number of households was 27,596.

== Transportation ==
Deo has a road network providing connectivity with the state of Bihar and other parts of the country. The Grand Trunk Road from Kolkata to Delhi passes some 4 km from Deo. This road is known as National Highway 19 (before 2010, National Highway 2)

== Tour Places ==
=== Deo Sun Temple ===
The Deo Sun Temple of Deo is a Hindu temple dedicated to the solar deity Surya located at Deo, Bihar Aurangabad district, Bihar, India.

=== Deo Fort ===
The Deo Fort are located in Deo, Aurangabad district.

=== Biodiversity park, Deo ===
Biodiversity park in Bharkur village of Deo is the first biodiversity park of Aurangabad which is spread over about 15 acres.

== Educational institutions ==
- Raja Jagannath High School, Deo
- Rani Brajraj Kumari Project High School, Deo
- Maharana Pratap College
- Bhagwan Shri Suryanarayana Inter College, Deo

== Notable people ==
- Rajan Singh former member of the Bihar Legislative Council
- Shakti Kumar Mishra is an Indian politician

== See also ==
- Deo Sun Temple
- Deo Fort
- Deo Raj
