= Deo Surya Mandir =

Hindu Temple in Bihar, India

- Devark, Dewark
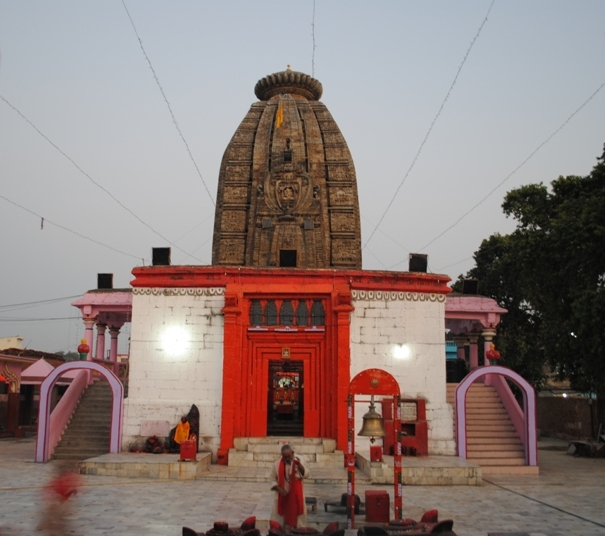
- Deo Sun Temple

- Deo, Bihar, India

Religion
- Affiliation: Hinduism
- Festival: Chhath

Location
- Location: Deo, Bihar, India
- Coordinates: 24.658791°N 84.437026°E

Architecture
- Architect: According to ASI. built in 8th century
- Type: Mix of Nagara architecture, Dravidian architecture & Vesara architecture
- Completed: According to ASI. built temple in fifth to sixth century

Deo Sun Temple is a Hindu temple in Bihar, India. The temple is a solar shrine, dedicated to Surya, the sun god, for Chhath Puja. The temple is located in Deo Town, Aurangabad. The Temple is unique as it faces west, the setting sun, not the usual rising sun. It is considered to be one of the most sacred places for sun worshiping and Chhath Puja.

== History ==
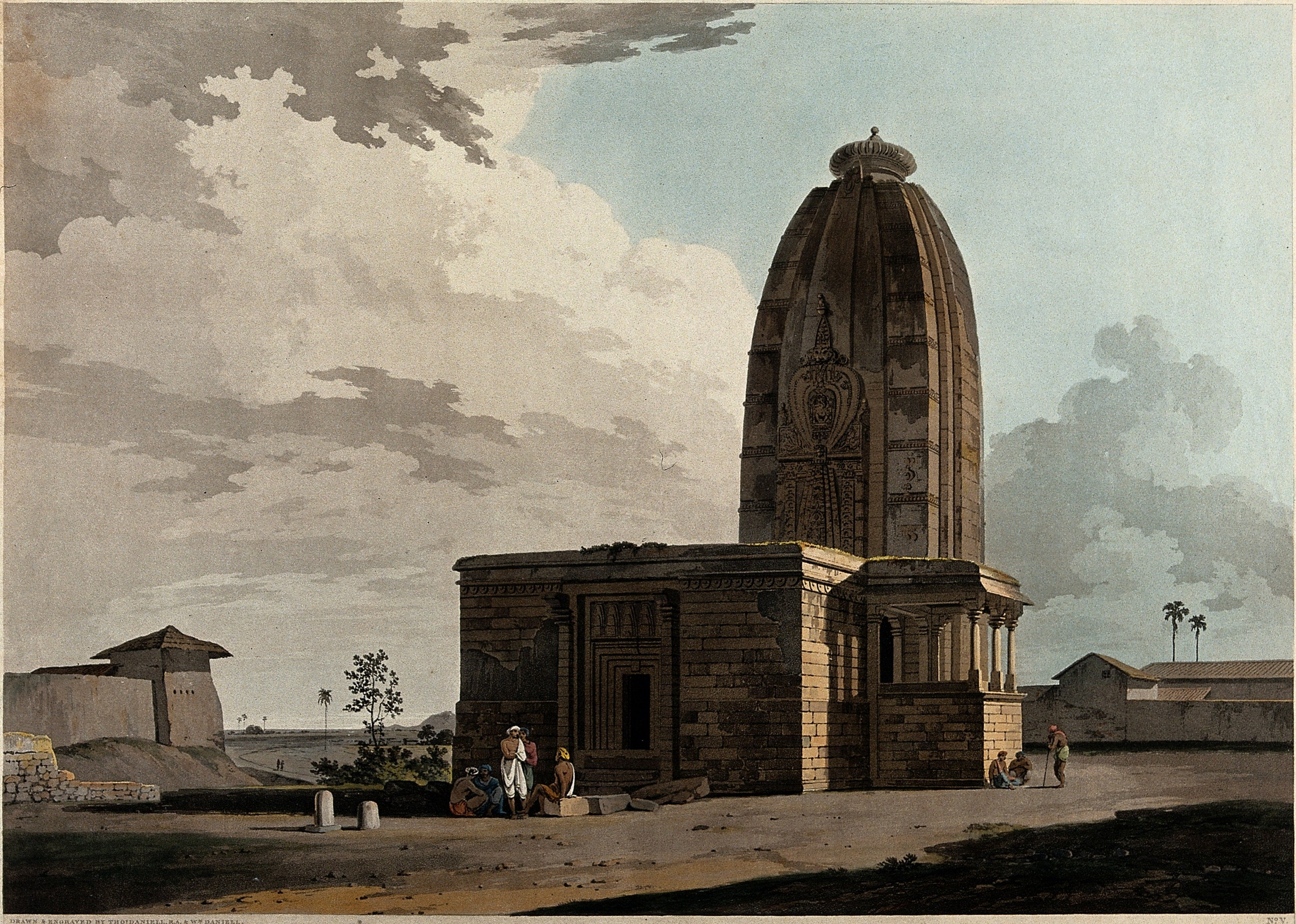
The temple, ca. 1790 by Thomas Daniell

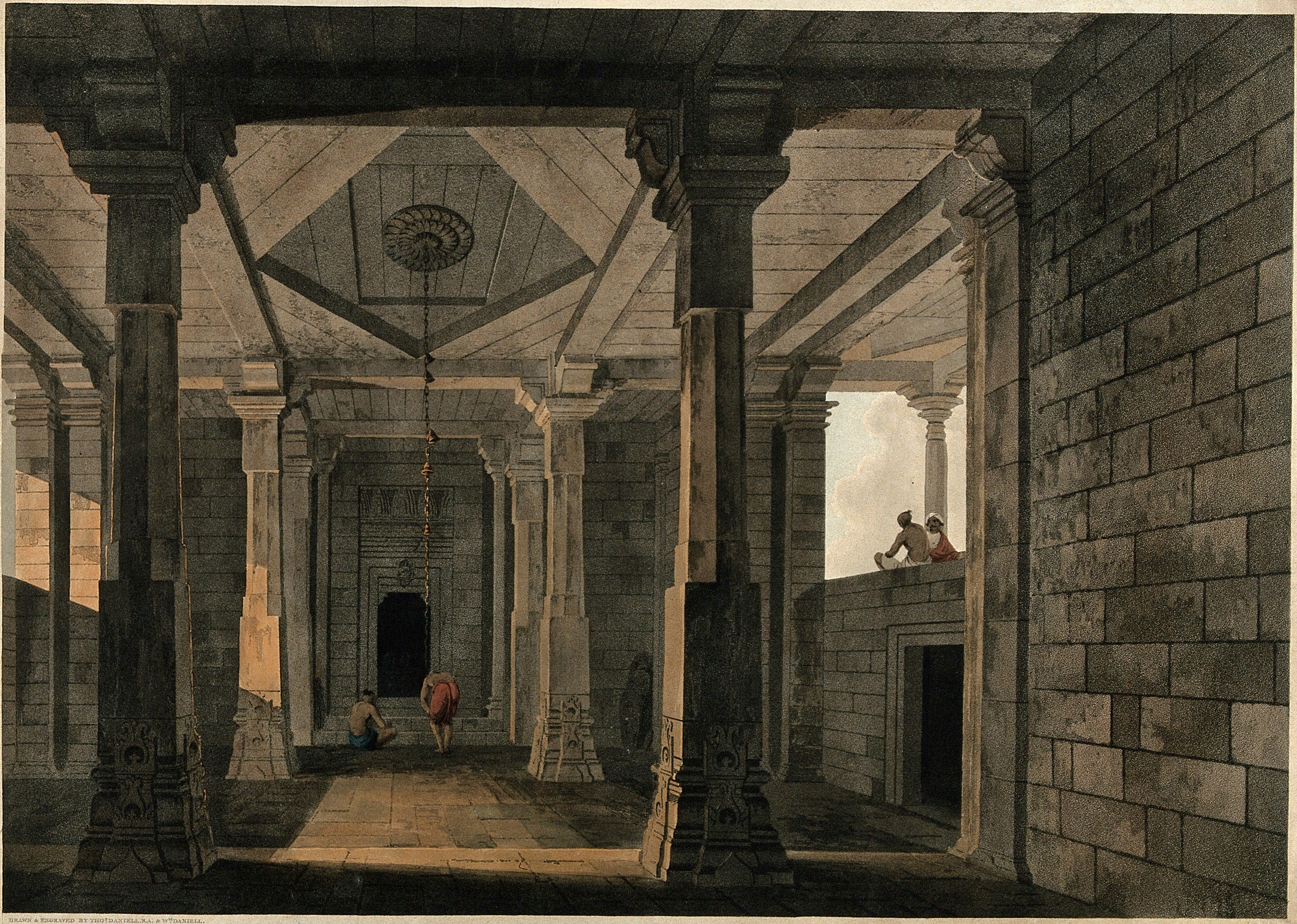
The interior

According to oral tradition, Lord Vishwakarma built the Deo Sun Temple in one night. A gupta-era inscription dated 642 CE talks about sun worshiping, but it does not mention the Deo Sun Temple directly. However, some inscriptions and local oral traditions do hint at the presence of temple around the 7th or 8th century CE.

Its written history can be traced back to the pala and senua periods, with an inscription from 1437 documenting the dedication of the template by King Bhairavendra. The inscription also lists twelve of King Bhairavendra's ancestors and suggests that the temple exists in its present state thanks to local Hindu chieftains who recovered the temple after Muhammad bin Bakhtiyar Khalji's invasion of Bengal. Since most sun temples face towards the rising sun, some scholars believe that this temple could have been a Buddhist temple originally, later being destroyed by Muhammad bin Bakhtiyar Khalji, and finally being converted to a sun temple by Bhairavendra.

== Architecture and design ==
The temple is a mixture of Nagara Architecture, Dravidian architecture, and Vesara architecture. A dome shape is carved above the Dev Sun Temple, with a gold urn placed above the dome.

== Cultural significance ==
The temple is famous for its annual Chhath festival celebration. Lakhs of devotees from all over Bihar and other regions visit temple to worship, attend Chhath Mela, bathe in the holy Surya Kund and offer arghya.

== See also ==
- Deo Fort
- Deo Town
