= State Highway 1 (Bihar) =

Road in Bihar, India

State Highway 1

Route information
- Maintained by Bihar State Road Development Corporation (BSRDC)

Major junctions
- North end: Kumhrar (Patna district)
- South end: Masaurhi (Patna district)

Location
- Country: India
- State: Bihar

Highway system
- Roads in India; Expressways; National; State; Asian; State Highways in Bihar

State Highway 1 (SH-1) is a state highway in Bihar state. It covers only one districts i.e. Patna district of Bihar state. This state highway starts from Zero Mile near Kumhrar and ends at NH-22 near Masaurhi.

== Route ==
The route of SH-1 from north to south is as follows:

- NH 22 at Zero Mile/ Kumhrar (Patna)
- Patliputra ISBT
- Sampatchak
- Gauri Chak (Punpun River)
- SH 78 at Beldari Chak
- Dhanarua
- Taregana
- NH 22 at Masaurhi
