= List of state highways in Bihar =

Bihar has state highways with a total length of 4,006 km (2,489 mi) and national highways with a total length of 5,358 km (3,329 mi).

The state highway network provides road connections between major towns and regional centres across Bihar. In northern Bihar, the road network connects Mehsi in East Champaran district with Deoria and Muzaffarpur, forming a regional road corridor between East Champaran and Muzaffarpur.

The Mehsi–Deoria–Muzaffarpur road corridor can be described as:

Mehsi → Deoria → Muzaffarpur

== List of state highways in Bihar ==
State highway №	Route	Passes through - district(s)	Length (in km)
SH 1	Sadikpur–Pavera–Masaurhi.	Patna	38.22
SH 2	Bihta–Bikram–Paliganj–Arwal.	Patna	37.70
SH 4	Fatuha-Daniawan-Hilsa-Ekangarsarai-Islampur-Hulasganj-Khizarsarai-Gaya.	Patna, Nalanda, Jehanabad, Gaya	82.16
SH 5	Biharsharif-Parwalpur-Ekangarsarai-Telhara Road. Ekangarsarai-Jehanabad-Arwal Road.	Jehanabad, Arwal	89.77
SH 6	Biharsharif-Barbigha-Shekhpura-Sikandara-Jamui-Kharagpur Road.	Jamui, Shekhpura, Lakhisarai	95
SH 7	Gaya-Panchananpur-Daudnagar Road	Gaya	35.2
SH 8	Nawada-Pakribarwan Road.	Nawada	30.8
SH 8	Gaya-Manpur Town portion Road.	Gaya	1.5
SH 8	Gaya-Nawada Road.	Nawada	14.65
SH 8	Lakhisarai-Sikandara Road.	Lakhisarai	24
SH 11	Aurangabad-Amba-Hariharganj Road	Aurangabad	1.3
SH 12	Arrah-Sasaram Road.	Rohtas	48.4
SH 12	Arrah-Sasaram Road.	Shahabad	47
SH 13	New Bypass Road.	Buxar	2
SH 13	Buxar-Chausa Road.	Buxar	10
SH 14	Mohania-Ramgarh Road.	Bhabhua	15
SH 14	Ramgarh-Chausa Road.	Bhabhua	17
SH 14	Mohania-Bhabhua Road.	Bhabhua	14.4
SH 14	Ramgarh-Chausa Road.	Buxar	17
SH 15	Dehri-Nasriganj-Vikramganj Road.	Rohtas	45
15	Vikramganj-Dinara Road.	Rohtas	20
16	Dehri-Amjhore Road.	Rohtas	38
16	Akbarpur-Pipradih-Yadunathpur-Jardeg Road.	Rohtas	67
17	Sasaram-Chausa Road.	Buxar	24
17	Sasaram-Chausa Road.	Rohtas	41
18	Dumka Sahebganj Road.	Gorgama	18
18	Lakhisarai-Shekhpura Road.	Lakhisarai	12.84
18	Lakhisarai-Shekhpura Road.	Shekhpura	9.5
18	Lakhisarai-Jamui Road.	Lakhisarai	13
18	Sikandara-Jamui-Kharagpur Road.	Jamui	58
18	Jamui-Jhajha-Chakai Road.	Jamui	63
18	Sarwan-Chakai-Jasidih-Chopa Road.	Jamui	20
18	Lakhisarai-Jamui Road.	Jamui	16
18	Jamui ByPass Road.	Jamui	1
19	Bhagalpur-Hansdiha Road.	Bhagalpur	16
19	Bhagalpur-Hansdiha Road.	Banka	51
22	Sultanganj-Tarapur-Dardmara Road.	Munger	34
22	Sultanganj-Tarapur Road.	Bhagalpur	6
22	Sultanganj-Tarapur Road.	Banka	58
23	Bhagalpur Godda - Pirpainti Road.	Bhagalpur	10
25	Bhagalpur-Amarpur via Kajraili Road.	Banka	32
25	Bhagalpur-Amarpur via Kajraili Road.	Bhagalpur	16
25	Banka-Katoria Road.	Banka	32
45	Chapra-Siwan Road.	Saran	0.9
45	Harkhua-Khwajepur Road.	Gopalganj	2.2
46	Chapra-Rewaghat Road.	Saran	3.5
46	Muzaffarpur-Rewaghat Road.	Muzaffarpur	3.9
47	Siwan-Barharia-Sarfara Road.	Siwan	18
47	Siwan-Mairwa-Guthani Road.	Siwan	36.25
47	Siwan-Barharia-Sarfara Road.	Gopalganj	17.25
48	Muzaffarpur-Hajipur Road.	Vaishali	1.8
48	Muzaffarpur-Sitamarhi Road.	Muzaffarpur	3.6
48	Muzaffarpur-Hajipur Road.	Muzaffarpur	4.1
49	Mahua-Tajpur Road.	Vaishali	23
49	Mahua-Tajpur Road.	Samastipur	8
49	Hajipur-Mahua Road.	Vaishali	21
49	Samastipur-Tajpur Road.	Samastipur	12
50	Darbhanga (Laheria Sarai)-Samastipur Road.	Darbhanga	16
50	Hazma Chowk-Laheria Sarai-Kathalbari Road.	Darbhanga	6.5
50	Panda Sarai-Bela Mabbi Road.	Darbhanga	0.75
50	Samastipur-Musari-Gharari Road.	Samastipur	9
50	Darbhanga (Laheriasarai)-Samastipur Road.	Samastipur	22
51	Phulparas-Khutauna-Laukaha Road.	Madhubani	32.7
52	Rahika-Benipatti-Pupri Road.	Madhubani	39.6
52	Rahika-Madhubani Road.	Madhubani	8
52	Madhubani-Saurath-Pokhraini Road.	Madhubani	2
52	Madhubani-Rampatti-Jhanjharpur Road.	Madhubani	22
52	Sitamarhi-Pupri Road.	Sitamarhi	26.42
53	Chapra-Salempur Road.	Gopalganj	10
54	Bettiah-Govindganj Road.	West Champaran	18
54	Sitamarhi-Sheohar-Nasaurha- Belwaghat Road.	Sheohar	13.64
54	Motihari-Dhaka Road.	East Champaran	3
54	Motihari-Dhaka-Belwaghat Road.	East Champaran	41.38
54	Motihari-Madhubanighat Road.	East Champaran	1.5
54	Motihari-Turkaulia-Govindganj Road.	East Champaran	35
54	Bettiah-Govindganj-Turkaulia Road.	East Champaran	17
55	Sagi-Rosera Road.	Samastipur	5
55	Samastipur-Rosera Road.	Samastipur	26
55	Samastipur-Dalsinghsarai Road.	Samastipur	5
55	Begusarai-Manjhaul-Sagi Road.	Begusarai	41
56	Darbhanga-Bahera Road.	Darbhanga	24
56	Bahera-Biraul-Kusheshwar Asthan Road.	Darbhanga	41.6
56	Sakri-Bahera Road.	Darbhanga	0.3
57	Madhepura-Bazar Road.	Madhepura	2.25
58	Bihpur-Birpur Road	Khagaria	3.5
58	Chausa-Laualagam-Vijayghat Road.	Madhepura	3.5
59	Sonbarsa-Baijnathpur Road.	Saharsa	24
60	Purnea-Araria-Forbesganj Road.	Purnea	19
60	Araria Zero-Mile to Araria Gorhi Chowk Road.	Araria	4.5
60	Pothia to Subhash Chowk Forbesganj Road.	Araria	11.5
60	Jogbani to Bathnaha in Jogbani via Kala Balua Path.	Araria	6.5
SH 62	Purnia-Katihar	Purnia, Katihar	29
63	Araria-Jokihat Road.	Araria	16
63	Thakurganj-Galgalia Road.	Kishanganj	10.2
63	Araria-Galgalia Road.	Kishanganj	68
64	Bagaha-Sadaho-Harnatand Road.	West Champaran	7
64	Bagaha-Triveni Road.	West Champaran	38
64	Bettiah-Bagaha Road.	West Champaran	66
64	Chapwa-Bettiah Road.	West Champaran	25
65	Purnia-Chunapur-Dhamdaha-Rupauli-Chandpur	Purnia, Katihar	63
66	Supaul-Singheshwar Asthan Road.	Supaul	14
66	Supaul Singheshwar Asthan Road.	Madhepura	13.3
66	Saharsa-Supaul Road.	Saharsa	19
66	Saharsa-Supaul Road.	Supaul	15
67	Kudra-Chenari Road.	Rohtas	23
67	Chenari-Shivsagar Road.	Rohtas	20
SH-68	Shivganj - Rafiganj - Goh - Uphara - Deokund- Baidarabad		78
69	Dumaria - Imamganj - Sherghati - Karmain - Mathurapur - Guraru - Ahiapur - Tekari - Mau - Kurtha - Kinjar -Paliganj - Rani Talab	Patna, Arwal, Gaya	153
70	Gaya - Fatehpur - Sirdalla - Rajauli		58
71	Jehanabad - Ghosi - Islampur - Rajgir - Giryak- Parwatipur		85
72	Jamui - Lakshmipur - Kharagpur - Bariyarpur		58
73	Siwan - Basantpur - Mashrak - Taraiya - Amnor - Sonho- Parsa - Shitalpur		88
74	Hajipur - Vaishali - Deoria - Sahebganj - Kesaria - Khajuriya - Areraj		85
75	Darbhanga - Kamtaul - Basaitha - Madhwapur		47
76	Araria - Raniganj - Jadia - Triveniganj - Pipra - Supaul - Vishnupur - Bhaptiyahi		121
77	Kursela - Pothia - Palka - Meergunj - Sarsi - Kalabalua - Raniganj - Saifganj - Forbesganj	Katihar, Purnia, Araria	105
78	Bihta - Naubatpur - Neva - Dumari - Beldari Chak, Patna - Kansari - Daniawan & Chand - Noorsarai - Bhagan Bigaha -Rahui - Bind - Gopalbad - Sarmera	Patna,Nalanda	112
78	muzaffarpur-mahuwa roar 36 km viya- maniyari madarsa chok chainpur bangra muaffarpur		
82	Nawada(kadirganj)-roh-kawakol	Nawada	
82	Khaira-jamui-Jhajha	Jamui	

Sh 92 Katihar to Balrampur

== See also ==
- Bihar State Road Development Corporation
- Bihar State Road Transport Corporation
