= State Highway 68 (Bihar) =

Road in Bihar, India

State Highway 68

Route information
- Maintained by Bihar State Road Development Corporation Limited (BSRDCL)
- Length: 82.25 km (51.11 mi)

Major junctions
- North end: Baidarabad (Arwal)
- South end: Shivganj (Aurangabad)

Location
- Country: India
- State: Bihar

Highway system
- Roads in India; Expressways; National; State; Asian; State Highways in Bihar

State Highway 68 (SH-68) is one of the key roads constructed under Bihar State Highways Project-1. The highway is 82.25 kilometres (51.11 mi) long and connects Shivganj in Aurangabad district to Baidarabad in Arwal district, passing through:

- Rafiganj
- Goh
- Uphara
- Devkund
- Shahar Telpa

SH-68 serves as a link between three national highways:

- NH 19 near Shivganj
- NH 120 near Goh
- NH 139 at Baidarabad

== Bihar State Highways Project-1 ==
Bihar State Highways Project-1 is an infrastructure development initiative undertaken by the Bihar State Road Development Corporation Limited (BSRDCL) to upgrade and expand the state highway network in the Indian state of Bihar. Under this project, a total of nine state highways were constructed, covering a combined length of 824.22 kilometers across 18 districts of Bihar.

The project was aimed at improving road connectivity between major towns and cities within the state and enhancing access to the National Highways network. It was implemented in multiple phases, with the first phase focusing on the construction of nine key highways.

== Objectives ==
The main objectives of Bihar State Highways Project-1 include:

- Strengthening intrastate connectivity
- Reducing travel time and transport costs
- Linking regional roads to the National Highway network
- Promoting economic development through improved transportation infrastructure

== Implementing agency ==
The project was implemented by the Bihar State Road Development Corporation Limited (BSRDCL), a government undertaking responsible for highway planning and development within Bihar.

== See also ==
- List of state highways in Bihar
- National Highways Development Project
