= Punam Devi =

Indian politician

Member of Bihar Legislative Assembly
- In office 2010–2015
- Preceded by: constituency established
- Succeeded by: Sanjeev Chaurasiya
- Constituency: Digha
- In office 2005–2010
- Preceded by: Dharmendra Prasad Yadav
- Succeeded by: Arun Manjhi
- Constituency: Masaurhi
- In office 1985–1990
- Preceded by: Ganesh Prasad Singh
- Succeeded by: Yogeshwar Gop
- Constituency: Masaurhi

Personal details
- Born: Punam Devi; 26 January 1960 (age 66) Bihar, India
- Party: Indian National Congress
- Other political affiliations: Janta Dal (United)
- Spouse: Jageshwar Singh
- Education: Magadh University
- Profession: Ex Chairman, Women and Child Development Committee, Bihar Vidhan Sabha

Punam Devi (born 1957) is an Indian politician from Bihar. She was a former member of the Bihar Legislative Assembly from Masaurhi constituency and Digha constituency in Patna district. She won for the first time in the 1985 Bihar Legislative Assembly election representing the Indian National Congress. Later, she shifted to Janata Dal (United) and won twice from Masaurhi in 2005 and Digha in 2010. She rejoined Indian National Congress before 2024 Indian general election.

== Early life and education ==
Devi is from Masaurhi, Patna district, Bihar. She married Jageshwar Singh. She studied Class 12 at DN Collage PS Jatti Chak, Masaurhi and passed her intermediate examinations in 1986.

== Career ==
Devi won from Masaurhi Assembly constituency representing the Indian National Congress in the 1985 Bihar Legislative Assembly election. She lost the 1990 Bihar Legislative Assembly election on Indian National Congress ticket. She polled 30,176 votes and lost to Yogeshwar Gop of the Indian People's Front by a margin of 966 votes. Later, she shifted to Janata Dal (United) and won the February 2005 Bihar Legislative Assembly election and the October 2005 Bihar Legislative Assembly election from Masaurhi seat.

For the 2010 Bihar Legislative Assembly election, she contested from Digha Assembly constituency on JD (U) ticket and won by a margin of 60,462 votes. She polled 81,247 votes and defeated her nearest rival, Satya Nand Sharma of the Lok Janshakti Party. In May 2024, she returned to the Indian National Congress after 24 years, citing dissatisfaction with the BJP-led NDA government's rule. Earlier on 27 December 2014, she was disqualified along with three others, by the speaker, for alleged anti party activities and cross voting in the Rajya Sabha by elections. However, the court in June 2015 allowed them to participate in the winter session of the assembly.
