= Patliputra Inter-State Bus Terminal =

Inter-state Bus Terminal in Patna, Bihar, India

Patliputra Inter-State Bus Terminal पाटलिपुत्रा अन्तर्राज्यीय बस अड्डा
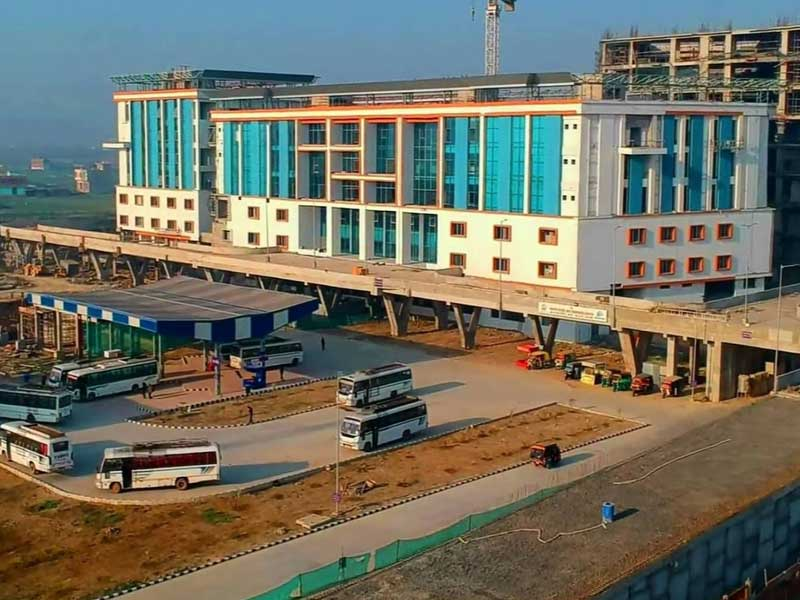

General information
- Other names: Bairiya Bus Terminal Patna; Patna New Bus stand
- Location: Raman Chak Bairiya, near Pahari village, Patna, Bihar 800007
- Coordinates: 25.579057°N 85.1891°E
- System: ISBT
- Owner: Government of Bihar
- Connections: Blue Line Patliputra Bus Terminal

Construction
- Parking: Available
- Accessible: Available

Other information
- Website: Patliputra ISBT

History
- Opened: 18 September 2020
Location
- Location within Patna Location within Bihar Location within India

The Patliputra Inter-State Bus Terminal (Patliputra ISBT) or Bairiya Bus Terminal is an Inter State Bus Terminal (ISBT) in Patna, Bihar, India. It is the first ISBT of Bihar and is situated on State Highway 1 (SH-1) between Raman Chak and Pahari village in Patna. The Patliputra ISBT was inaugurated on 18 September 2020.

In 2022, government buses under the Bihar State Road Transport Corporation (BSRTC) running from Bankipur bus depot at Gandhi Maidan were shift to this new bus terminal. Two terminals are constructed at ISBT Patna.

== Location ==
Patliputra Inter-State Bus Terminal (Patliputra ISBT) is situated at Zero Mile (near Kumhrar) on Kumhrar-Masaurhi highway (SH-1).

== Proposal for new ISBT ==
In 2022, Bihar Urban Infrastructure Development Corporation Limited (BUIDCO) was given the responsibility to select the consultant agency to prepare the detailed project report (DPR) for establishing a new-integrated bus terminus project at Kanhauli in Bihta.

== See also ==
- Parivahan Parisar
- Phulwari Sharif
- New ISBT metro station
