= Yogeshwar Gop =

Indian politician

MLA, Bihar Legislative Assembly
- In office 1990–1995
- Preceded by: Punam Devi
- Succeeded by: Ganesh Yadav
- Constituency: Masaurhi

Personal details
- Born: 1925
- Died: 25 October 2007 (aged 81–82) Patna, Bihar
- Party: Indian People's Front (Now CPIML)
- Occupation: Politician

Yogeshwar Gop was an Indian politician. He was elected as a member of Bihar Legislative Assembly from Masaurhi constituency in Patna, Bihar.

== See also ==
- Masaurhi Assembly constituency
- Pataliputra (Lok Sabha constituency)
