= Arun Manjhi =

Indian politician (born 1973)

Member of Bihar Legislative Assembly
- Incumbent
- Assumed office 2025
- Preceded by: Rekha Devi
- Constituency: Masaurhi
- In office 2010–2015
- Preceded by: Punam Devi
- Succeeded by: Rekha Devi

Personal details
- Party: Janata Dal (United)

Arun Manjhi is an Indian politician and two times Member of Bihar Legislative Assembly, the incumbent member of the Bihar Legislative Assembly from Masaurhi Assembly constituency seat.
