= Lewan =

Lewan is a surname. Notable people with the surname include:

- Jan Lewan, born Jan Lewandowski, (born 1941), Polish-American songwriter and polka band leader
- Taylor Lewan (born 1991), American football player

== See also ==
- Lewak
- Lewin
- Rewan
