= Ram Devan Das =

Indian politician

MLA, Bihar Legislative Assembly
- In office 1969–1972
- Preceded by: Bhuwaneshwar Sharma
- Succeeded by: Bhubaneshwar Sharma
- Constituency: Masaurhi

Personal details
- Born: Sakarpura, Masaurhi, Patna, Bihar
- Party: Bharatiya Jana Sangh (Now BJP)
- Occupation: Politician

Ram Devan Das also known as Sadhu Ji was an Indian politician. He was elected as a member of Bihar Legislative Assembly from Masaurhi constituency in Patna, Bihar.

== See also ==
- Masaurhi Assembly constituency
- Pataliputra (Lok Sabha constituency)
