= Ramdeo Prasad Yadav =

Indian politician

MLA, Bihar Legislative Assembly
- In office 1977–1980
- Preceded by: Bhuwaneshwar Sharma
- Succeeded by: Ganesh Yadav
- Constituency: Masaurhi

Personal details
- Born: Patna, Bihar
- Party: Janata Party
- Occupation: Politician

Ramdeo Prasad Yadav was an Indian politician. He was elected as a member of Bihar Legislative Assembly from Masaurhi constituency in Patna, Bihar.

== See also ==
- Masaurhi Assembly constituency
- Pataliputra (Lok Sabha constituency)
