= Masaurhi Assembly constituency =

Assembly constituency in Bihar, India

Coordinates: 25°21′21″N 85°2′1″E

Masaurhi
- Constituency No. 189 for the Bihar Legislative Assembly

Constituency details
- Country: India
- Region: East India
- State: Bihar
- District: Patna
- Lok Sabha constituency: 31 Pataliputra
- Established: 1957
- Total electors: 326,914

Member of Legislative Assembly
- 18th Bihar Legislative Assembly
- Incumbent Arun Manjhi
- Party: JD(U)
- Alliance: NDA
- Elected year: 2025

Masaurhi is one of 243 constituencies of legislative assembly of Bihar. It comes under Pataliputra (Lok Sabha constituency) along with other assembly constituencies viz. Danapur, Maner, Phulwari, Paliganj and Bikram. It is reserved for scheduled castes.

== Overview ==
Masaurhi comprises CD Blocks Masaurhi & Dhanarua.

== Members of the Legislative Assembly ==
Year	Name	Party
1957	Nawal Kishore Singh	Indian National Congress
1962	Saraswati Chaudhary	Indian National Congress
1967	Bhuwaneshwar Sharma	Communist Party of India
1969	Ram Devan Das	Bharatiya Jana Sangh
1972	Bhuwaneshwar Sharma	Communist Party of India
1977	Ramdeo Prasad Yadav	Janata Party
1980	Ganesh Prasad Singh	Janata Party (Secular)
1985	Punam Devi	Indian National Congress
1990	Yogeshwar Gop	Indian People's Front
1995	Ganesh Prasad Singh	Janata Dal
2000	Dharmendra Prasad Yadav	Rashtriya Janata Dal
2005	Punam Devi	Janata Dal (United)
2005	Punam Devi	Janata Dal (United)
2010	Arun Manjhi	Janata Dal (United)
2015	Rekha Devi	Rashtriya Janata Dal
2020	Rekha Devi	Rashtriya Janata Dal
2025	Arun Manjhi	Janata Dal (United)

== Election results ==
=== 2025 ===
2025 Bihar Legislative Assembly election: Masaurhi
Party	Candidate	Votes	%	±%
JD(U)	Arun Manjhi	106,505	47.16	+13.35
RJD	Rekha Devi	98,862	43.78	−6.43
JSP	Rajeshwar Manjhi	4,693	2.08	
BSP	Manoj Kumar	4,076	1.8	−0.95
NOTA	None of the above	5,146	2.28	+0.46
Majority		7,643	3.38	−13.02
Turnout		225,819	69.08	+10.8
JD(U) gain from RJD		Swing		

=== 2020 ===
2020 Bihar Legislative Assembly election: Masaurhi
Party	Candidate	Votes	%	±%
RJD	Rekha Devi	98,696	50.21	+1.95
JD(U)	Nutan Paswan	66,469	33.81	
LJP	Parshuram Kumar	9,682	4.93	
BSP	Raj Kumar Ram	5,412	2.75	+0.46
Bhartiya Sablog Party	Sarita Paswan	3,016	1.53	
Independent	Sikandar Paswan	2,185	1.11	
Independent	Ramji Ravidas	1,857	0.94	
NOTA	None of the above	3,583	1.82	+0.57
Majority		32,227	16.4	−4.69
Turnout		196,570	58.28	+0.59
RJD hold		Swing		

=== 2015 ===
2015 Bihar Legislative Assembly election: Masaurhi
Party	Candidate	Votes	%	±%
RJD	Rekha Devi	89,657	48.26	
HAM(S)	Nutan Paswan	50,471	27.17	
CPI(ML)L	Gopal Ravidas	18,903	10.17	
BSP	Raj Kumar Ram	4,247	2.29	
Independent	Rekha Devi (Vill-Bara)	2,990	1.61	
Independent	Nandlal Paswan	2,821	1.52	
Independent	Hira Chaudhary	2,322	1.25	
Independent	Mukesh Kumar	2,305	1.24	
Independent	Bhagirath Manjhi	2,062	1.11	
NOTA	None of the above	2,326	1.25	
Majority		39,186	21.09	
Turnout		185,788	57.69	
RJD gain from JD(U)		Swing		

=== 2010 ===
Bihar assembly elections, 2010: Masaurhi
Party	Candidate	Votes	%	±%
JD(U)	Arun Manjhi	56977	39.94	
LJP	Anil Kumar	51,945	36.41	
Majority		32,227		
Turnout				
Registered electors				
JD(U) hold		Swing		

== See also ==
- List of Assembly constituencies of Bihar
- Masaurhi
