= Rekha Devi =

Indian politician

Member of Bihar Legislative Assembly
- In office 2015–2025
- Preceded by: Arun Manjhi
- Succeeded by: Arun Manjhi
- Constituency: Masaurhi

Personal details
- Born: Masaurhi, Patna, Bihar
- Party: Rashtriya Janata Dal
- Parent: Arvind Paswan (Father)
- Education: 7th Pass
- Occupation: Politician; Social Work

Rekha Devi is an Indian politician from Bihar. She is a member of the Bihar Legislative Assembly, representing the Rashtriya Janata Dal from Masaurhi Assembly constituency which is reserved for Scheduled Caste community in Patna district.

== Early life and education ==
Devi is from Masaurhi, Patna district, Bihar. She is the daughter of Arvind Paswan. She studied Class 7 and later discontinued her studies.

== Career ==
Devi won from Masaurhi Assembly constituency representing Rashtriya Janata Dal in the 2020 Bihar Legislative Assembly election. She polled 98,696 votes and defeated her nearest rival, Nutan Paswan of Janata Dal (United) by a margin of 32,227 votes. She first became an MLA winning the 2015 Bihar Legislative Assembly election, where she defeated Nutan Paswan, who contested on Hindustani Awam Morcha ticket. She polled 89,657 votes and defeated Paswan by a margin of 39,186 votes.
