= Dharmendra Prasad Yadav =

Indian politician

MLA, Bihar Legislative Assembly
- In office 2000–2005
- Preceded by: Ganesh Yadav
- Succeeded by: Punam Devi
- Constituency: Masaurhi

Personal details
- Born: Masaurhi, Patna, Bihar
- Party: Rashtriya Janata Dal
- Occupation: Politician

Dharmendra Prasad Yadav was an Indian politician. He was elected as a member of Bihar Legislative Assembly from Masaurhi constituency in Patna, Bihar.

== See also ==
- Masaurhi Assembly constituency
- Pataliputra (Lok Sabha constituency)
