= Digha Assembly constituency =

Assembly constituency in Bihar, India

Coordinates: 25.6411°N 85.0906°E

- Constituency No. 181 for the Bihar Legislative Assembly

Constituency details
- Country: India
- Region: East India
- State: Bihar
- District: Patna
- Lok Sabha constituency: 30 Patna Sahib
- Established: 2008
- Total electors: 458,367
- Reservation: None

Member of Legislative Assembly
- 18th Bihar Legislative Assembly
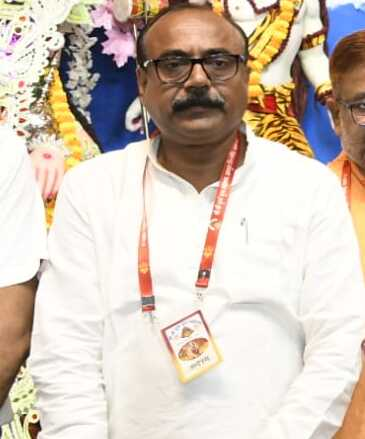
- Incumbent Sanjeev Chaurasiya
- Party: BJP
- Alliance: NDA
- Elected year: 2025
- Preceded by: Punam Devi

Digha Assembly constituency is one of 243 legislative assembly constituencies of the legislative assembly of Bihar in India. It comes under Patna Sahib (Lok Sabha constituency). Digha Assembly constituency has six panchayats and 14 wards. The wards are of Patna Municipal Corporation. Digha is Bihar's largest assembly constituency having 400 booths with around 4 lakh voters. This constituency is dominated by the Kayastha Caste .In 2015 Bihar Legislative Assembly election, Digha was one of the 36 seats to have VVPAT enabled electronic voting machines.

Most successful parties from Digha Assembly
1. BJP (3 times) (75.0%)
2. JDU (1 time) (25.0%)

== Overview ==
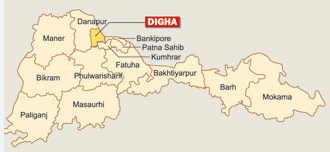
Digha in Patna district

Digha comprises:

- Gram Panchayat Nakta Diyara, Ward Nos. 1, 2, 3, 6,
- Pataliputra Housing Colony (OG) – Ward No. 38 & Digha-Mainpura (OG) Ward No. 39,
- Badalpura (OG) Ward No. 40,
- Sabazpura (OG) Ward No. 41 & Khalilpura (OG) Ward No. 42 in Patna (MC + OG) of Patna Rural CD Block.

== Members of the Legislative Assembly ==
Year	Name	Party
Until 2008: Constituency did not exist
2010	Punam Devi	Janata Dal (United)
2015	Sanjeev Chaurasiya	Bharatiya Janata Party
2020	Sanjeev Chaurasiya	Bharatiya Janata Party
2025	Sanjeev Chaurasiya	Bharatiya Janata Party

== Election results ==
=== 2025 ===
Bihar Legislative Assembly Election, 2025: Digha
Party	Candidate	Votes	%	±%
BJP	Sanjeev Chaurasiya	111,001	56.59	−0.5
CPI(ML)L	Divya Gautam	51,922	26.47	−3.5
JSP	Ritesh Ranjan Singh alias Bittu Singh	22,071	11.25	
BSP	Prabhakar Kr. Singh	1,930	0.98	
NOTA	None of the above	3,102	1.58	+0.33
Majority		59,079	30.12	+3.0
Turnout		196,142	42.79	+5.8
BJP hold		Swing		

=== 2020 ===
Bihar Assembly election, 2020: Digha
Party	Candidate	Votes	%	±%
BJP	Sanjeev Chaurasiya	97,318	57.09	+6.35
CPI(ML)L	Shashi Yadav	51,084	29.97	
RLSP	Sanjay Kumar Sinha	5,583	3.28	
The Plurals Party	Shambhavi	4,713	2.76	
NOTA	None of the above	2,133	1.25	+0.43
Majority		46,234	27.12	+13.55
Turnout		170,471	36.99	−5.13
BJP hold		Swing		

=== 2015 ===
Bihar Assembly election, 2015: Digha
Party	Candidate	Votes	%	±%
BJP	Sanjeev Chaurasiya	92,671	50.74	
JD(U)	Rajeev Ranjan Prasad	67,892	37.17	
Hindustan Vikas Dal	Uday Chandra Choudhary	2,673	1.46	
Samras Samaj Party	Rajeev Ranjan Singh -Alias- Pintu Singh	2,597	1.42	
CPI	Pramod Kumar Nandan	1,827	1.0	
NOTA	None of the above	1,490	0.82	
Majority		24,779	13.57	
Turnout		182,656	42.12	
BJP gain from JD(U)		Swing		

=== 2010 ===
2010 Bihar Legislative Assembly election: Digha
Party	Candidate	Votes	%	±%
JD(U)	Punam Devi	81,247	62.03	
LJP	Satya Nand Sharma	20,785	15.87	
INC	Rajesh Kumar Sinha	9,215	7.04	
Independent	Harendra Prasad Singh	6,909	5.28	
JD(S)	Mohd. Danish Khan	2,742	2.09	
Majority		60,462	46.16	
Turnout		1,30,974	38.31	
JD(U) win (new seat)				

== See also ==
- List of constituencies of Bihar Legislative Assembly
- Digha, Patna
