= Sanjiv Chaurasiya =

Indian politician

Sanjiv Chaurasia
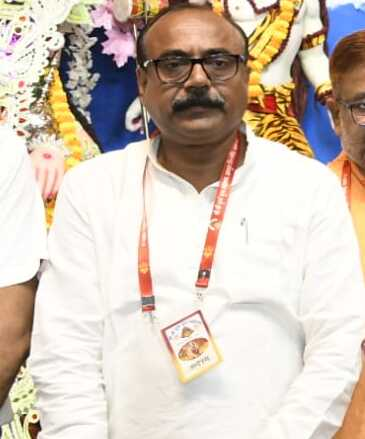

Member of Bihar Legislative Assembly
- Incumbent
- Assumed office 2015
- Preceded by: Punam Devi
- Constituency: Digha

Personal details
- Born: Sanjiv Chaurasia; 6 July 1969 (age 57) Patna, Bihar, India
- Party: Bharatiya Janata Party
- Parent: Ganga Prasad (father)
- Education: Ph.D.
- Alma mater: Ranchi University
- Profession: Assistant Professor, Politician

Sanjiv Chaurasia is an Indian politician. He was elected to the Bihar Legislative Assembly from Digha in the 2015 Bihar Legislative Assembly election as a member of the Bharatiya Janata Party.
