= Deokund Aurangabad =

Deokund
- Town
- Location in Bihar, India Deokund (India)
- Coordinates: 25.06°N 84.54°E
- Country: India
- State: Bihar
- District: Aurangabad

Government
  - Type: Town
- Elevation: 102 m (335 ft)

Population (2011)
  - Total: 3,000

Languages
  - Official: Hindi Maghi and Urdu
- Time zone: UTC+5:30 (IST)
- Postal code: 824202
- Vehicle registration: BR-26

Deokund is a small town in the Goh block of Aurangabad District of Bihar state in India. It belongs to the Magadh division. It is 80 km from Patna and 973 km from the national capital of Delhi. Large numbers of people go there for Chhath Puja every year.
