= Bihar State Road Transport Corporation =

Road Transport Corporation in Bihar

Bihar State Road Transport Corporation बिहार राज्य मार्ग परिवहन निगम

Overview
- Owner: Government of Bihar
- Locale: Bihar
- Transit type: Intercity bus service within State of Bihar and Interstate bus service to Delhi, Uttar Pradesh and Jharkhand International bus services to Nepal Local bus service in selected cities
- Daily ridership: 80,000
- Chief executive: Sanjay Kumar Aggarwal, IAS (Administrator)
- Headquarters: Bailey Road, Patna
- Website: bsrtc.co.in

Operation
- Began operation: 1953 as Rajya Transport; 1959 as Bihar State Road Transport Corporation

Bihar State Road Transport Corporation abbreviated as (BSRTC) is a state-owned road transportation company in Bihar. It was set up in 1959 under the provisions of Road Transport Corporation Act, 1950. It is wholly owned by the Government of Bihar. In year 2020 Chief Minister of Bihar inaugurated Pataliputra Bus Terminal commonly known as ISBT, Patna. It is the first ISBT of Bihar.

== History ==
Prior to May 1959, road transport services in Bihar were managed by Rajya Transport, which was set up in the year 1953 with the nationalisation of some routes in the state. Rajya Transport and Communication, Government of Bihar and was departmentally administered till it was transferred in May 1959 to Bihar State Road Transport Corporation (BSRTC), a statutory corporation created under the provisions of the State Road Transport Corporation Act, 1950.

Total capital invested in BSRTC till March 1983 was ₹ 53.9 crores out of which ₹ 24.77 crores was the share capital of the state government and ₹ 465 crores loans from the same source, while ₹ 24.48 crores was contributed from other sources in the shape of shares and loans. Investment in BSRTC was second largest investment made by the Bihar Government, after Bihar State Electricity Board.

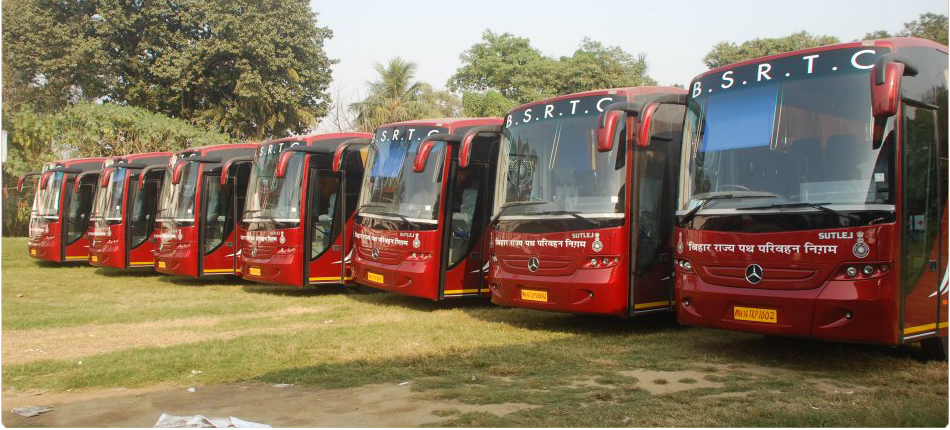
BSRTC Mercedes buses

Currently the Administrator of Bihar State Road Transport Corporation is Shrimati Basu Priya, IAS.

== Parivahan Parisar ==
Parivahan Parisar, located behind phulwarisharif jail has offices of Bihar State Road Transport Corporation Limited and district transport office. All the city (Patna) and intercity buses run by the Bihar State Road Transport Corporation start from this 24 acres Parivahan Parisar. This transport complex was inaugurated by Chief Minister Nitish Kumar in May 2023.

== Patna City Bus Service ==
This service is started on 3 May 2018 by BSRTC that was inaugurated by Hon'ble Chief Minister of Bihar Shri Nitish Kumar from Gyan Bhawan, Gandhi Maidan at two routes i.e. Gandhi Maidan to Danapur (111) and the second one is from Gandhi Maidan to Danapur Railway Station (111A). Later on, Bihar State Road Transport Corporation had started city bus service on various routes of Patna and nearby. Almost 50 thousands passenger travels through city bus services across all routes. But as per the demands of the daily passengers it needs to bring new buses on all routes to enhance the quality and safety of the passengers.

== Inter State Bus Service ==
BSRTC recently started the service of luxury Volvo buses from Patna and Kishanganj to Ghaziabad (Delhi NCR)
