= Shekhpura =

- Census town
- Location in Punjab, India Shekhpura (India)
- Coordinates: 25.1417°N 85.8629°E
- Country: India
- State: Punjab
- District: Patiala

Population (2001)
  - Total: 1,932

Languages
  - Official: Punjabi
- Time zone: UTC+5:30 (IST)

Shekhpura is a census town in Patiala district in the Indian state of Punjab.

== Demographics ==
As of 2001 India census, Shekhpura had a population of 1,932. Males constitute 53% of the population and females 47%. Shekhpura has an average literacy rate of 68%, higher than the national average of 59.5%: male literacy is 75%, and female literacy is 61%. In Shekhpura, 12% of the population is under 6 years of age.
