= Gorgama, Samastipur =

Coordinates: 25°04′N 87°36′E

Gorgama
- Village
- Interactive map of Gorgama
- Country: India
- State: Bihar
- District: Samastipur
- Elevation: 42 m (138 ft)

Languages
  - Official: Maithili, Hindi
- Time zone: UTC+5:30 (IST)
- PIN Code: 848504
- ISO 3166 code: IN-BR

Gorgama is a village located in the Samastipur District of the Indian state of Bihar.

== Geography ==
The village is bordered by the Baya River on both the northern and western sides.

== Demographics ==
It has approximately 1,800 residents, consisting mainly of Hindus (Bhumihars. Scheduled Caste and Muslim are also present. In October 2019, a mosque opened in the village. The mosque was named Madina Masjid.

== Education ==
Rajkiya Kanya Madhyamik Vidyalaya and Rajkiya Prathmik Vidalayay are primary schools there. They are adjacent to one other on the northern bank of the Baya River.

== Amenities ==
A large open field known as Kochilaban also borders the Baya River. This 12 ha areas is mainly land owned by Bhumihars. It is commonly used by all villagers and other villagers for fitness and religious activities such as festivals and games. The kochila van is land of Hindu sant matth and mukund which is the religious place and thousands of Indian army boys are made the Indian army soldiers and other protection forces.

== Transport ==
The village is situated near the Shahpur Patori railway station.

== Economy ==
Residents of the village are primarily dependent on agriculture. Fish farming is the main occupation for those in the western regions, as evidenced by the presence of artificial ponds in the region. Other key agricultural drivers include the harvest of crops such as maize, tobacco, wheat, pulses, and other vegetables. Animal husbandry, raising goats and cows, is also a common occupation and a key source of income.
