= Shahar Telpa =

Village in India

Coordinates: 25°08′N 84°39′E

Shahar Telpa Panchayat is a village in Karpi Block in Arwal District in the Indian state of Bihar. It belongs to the Magadh Division. It is located 14 km south from the District headquarters in Arwal. It is 9 km from Karpi and 83 km from the state capital Patna.

The panchayat is surrounded by Arwal Block in the north, Haspura Block in the west and Goh Block in the south.

Shahar Telpa borders the Arwal and Jehanabad districts. Jehanabad District, Ratni Faridpur, is in the east. It lies on the border of Patna.

== Demographics ==
Bhojpuri and Magahi are the local languages.

== Access ==
No railway station is with 10 km of Shahar Telpa Panchayat. The closest major station is Jehanabad Railway Station, 38 km away.

== Nearest cities ==
- Daudnagar - 21 km near Shahar Telpa Panchayat
- Makhdumpur - 36 km near Shahar Telpa Panchayat
- Jehanabad - 37 km near Shahar Telpa Panchayat
- Piro - 37 km near Shahar Telpa Panchayat

== Nearby taluks ==
- Karpi - 8 km
- Arwal - 14 km
- Haspura - 15 km
- Sahar - 15 km

== Nearby airports ==
- Gaya Airport - 57 km
- Patna Airport - 75 km
- Varanasi Airport - 207 km
- Ranchi Airport - 237 km

== Nearby tourist places ==
- Bodh Gaya - 64 km from Shahar Telpa Panchayat
- Sasaram - 75 km from Shahar Telpa Panchayat
- Patna - 81 km from Shahar Telpa Panchayat
- Golghar - 81 km from Shahar Telpa Panchayat
- Takht Sri Patna Sahib - 82 km from Shahar Telpa Panchayat
- Devkund mandir -6 km from Shahar Telpa Panchayat
- Baba Harkhu Nath Kund & temple Shahar telpa dih -1 km from Shahar Telpa Panchayat
- devi sthan shahar telpa dih -1 km from Shahar Telpa Panchayat
- Dev Surya mandir Aurangabad -58 km from Shahar Telpa Panchayat
- Belsaar Surya mandir- 11 km from Shahar Telpa Panchayat
- Masarwa temple-12 km from Shahar Telpa Panchayat
- Maa Tara temple kespa -35 km from Shahar Telpa Panchayat

== Nearby districts ==
- Arwal - 14 km from Shahar Telpa Panchayat
- Jehanabad - 38 km from Shahar Telpa Panchayat
- Bhojpur - 53 km from Shahar Telpa Panchayat
- Gaya - 56 km from Shahar Telpa Panchayat

== Schools in Shahar Telpa Panchayat ==
- Bhagwat High School, Bantara Road Shahar Telpa, Karpi, Arwal-19
- Middle School Telpa, Shahar telpa, Karpi Arwal-19

== Colleges near Shahar Telpa Panchayat ==
- Aps P.g & B.ed Institute Kinjer, Kurtha More Kinjer
- R.P.S Evening College Kinjer, Kinjer Arwal
- S.D.S College Kaler
