= Taregana =

Taregana Taregna
- Town
- Location in Bihar, India
- Coordinates: 25.350289°N 85.035222°E
- Country: India
- State: Bihar
- District: Patna
- Elevation: 61 m (200 ft)

Population (2011)
  - Total: 940

Languages
  - Official: Magadhi, Hindi
- Time zone: UTC+5:30 (IST)
- PIN: 804452
- Telephone code: 0612
- ISO 3166 code: IN-BR
- Website: https://www.taregna.in

Taregana or Taregna (literally, Counting Stars), is a small town near Masaurhi in Patna district, Bihar, India. It is about 30 kilometres (19 miles) from Patna. In the 6th century, the astronomer Aryabhata set up an astronomical observatory in the town.

== History ==
In Taregna, Aryabhata set up an astronomical observatory in the Sun Temple 6th century. It is believed that here he proposed the Heliocentric Model.

== Geography ==
Taregna is located at 61 meters above sea level as per Google Earth. It is close to Patna and Jahanabad. Transport to the village consists primarily of local railways or by a road from Patna. Additionally, there is a pond nearby.

== Demographics ==
Taregna is a small town, but is growing at a fast pace. In the village, there are markets that bring people from nearby villages such as Lawaich, Lasgarichak, Pathrahat, Bela, Jagidishpur, and more. Additionally, there is a temple called the 'Manichack' which witnesses over 5,000 of marriages every year. Taregna comes under the Masaurhi Sub-division (अनुमंडल).

== Transport ==
Taregna railway station, which is named after Taregna, is situated in the Masaurhi sub-division, which is a township of Patna district The village has a railway station on Patna–Gaya line (Station Code - TEA), and is connected to nearby cities like Patna through railway. Workers and government officers commute daily to the capital via the local trains. Because of the large amount of passenger traffic carried by the rail lines, there have been demands to increase the frequency of these trains.

== 22 July 2009 solar eclipse ==
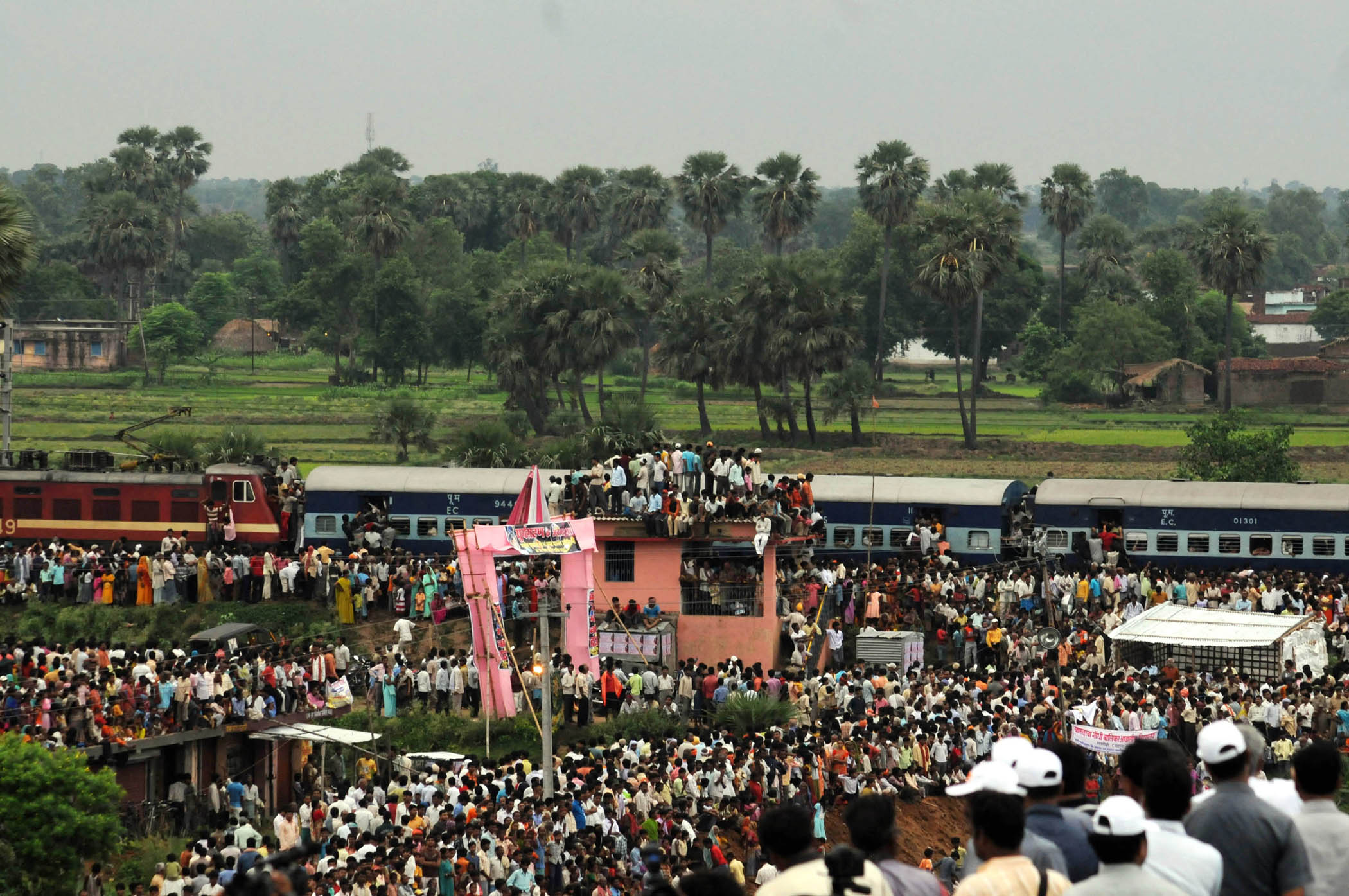
A crowd gathering at Taregna to view the eclipse on July 22, 2009

Taregna experienced a sudden load of visitors coming to the village to see the solar eclipse of July 22, 2009, as, according to various sources, it was to be one of the best locations within the path of totality to watch the solar eclipse. It was reported that the solar eclipse should be visible for at least three minutes and 38 seconds from Taregana. However, on 22 July the eclipse was obscured by heavy cloud cover.
