= Rewan =

Rewan is a given name. Notable people with the name include:

- Rewan Amin (born 1996), Dutch footballer
- Rewan Refaei (born 1996), Egyptian taekwondo practitioner

== See also ==
- Rowan (name)
- Rewan, Queensland, a rural locality in Queensland, Australia
- Rewan air crash, an air crash in Rewan, Queensland
