= Ganesh Prasad Singh =

Indian politician (born 1947)

MP
- In office 2004-2009
- Preceded by: Arun Kumar
- Succeeded by: Jagdish Sharma
- Constituency: Jahanabad

Personal details
- Born: 1 July 1947 (age 78) Patna, Bihar
- Party: Janata Dal (United)
- Other political affiliations: Rashtriya Janata Dal
- Spouse: Shyampeyari Devi (m. 1962)
- Children: 3
- As of 26 October, 2006

Ganesh Prasad Singh (born 1 July 1947) is a member of the 14th Lok Sabha of India. He represented the Jahanabad constituency of Bihar. He has supported the view that voluntary repatriation of refugees is the best and most durable solution, specifically in the case of Afghan refugees.

== Personal life ==
He was born to Ram Briksh Prasad and Rampati Devi in Masaurhi village of Patna district. He is married to Shyampeyari Devi.

== Education and Work ==
He passed matriculation in year 1962 from SMGK High School, Masaurhi, Patna. He got BA (Hons.) degree from B.N College, Patna and thereafter got degree of M.A and B.Ed from Patna University. He became an advocate and then he started legal practice in Patna District court as well in Patna High Court. He got elected from Masaurhi Assembly Constituency as an MLA in the year 1980 for the first time. In the second term again he got elected from Masaurhi Assembly Constituency in the year 1995. He got nominated as a chairman of petition committee in the same year. In 1998, he was nominated as a chairman of Bihar State Khadi Gramudyog Board, Patna and in the tenure of chairman of Khadi Gramudyog board, he twice got elected as the director of Bihar state financial corporation. In the year 2004, he got elected as MP from Jahanabad parliamentary constituency.

== Social Work ==
He has immense interest in serving the poor and needy people. He has established a high school in his village Masaurhi.

== USA visit ==
In 2005, he visited United States to participate in 60th UN Assembly conference and delivered a lecture on effects of international law and international law of rehabilitation of its implements.
