= Masaurhi =

Indian town in Patna district, Bihar

- City
- Location in Bihar, India
- Coordinates: 25.35°N 85.02°E
- Country: India
- State: Bihar
- District: Patna
- Elevation: 61 m (200 ft)

Population (2011)
  - Total: 241,216

Languages
  - Official: Magadhi, Hindi
- Time zone: UTC+5:30 (IST)
- PIN: 804452
- ISO 3166 code: IN-BR
- Website: www.masaurhi.in

Masaurhi also known as Taregna is a city and a Nagar Parishad in Patna district in the Indian state of Bihar. Masaurhi is also one of the 6 Sub-division in Patna district.

== Demographics ==
As of 2011 India census, Masaurhi has a population of 241,216. Males constitute 52.1% of the population, while females constitute 47.8%. Masaurhi has an average literacy rate of 53.03%, lower than the national average of 74.04%: male literacy is 61.5%, and female literacy is 43.8%. In Masaurhi, 17% of the population is under 6 years of age.

== Geography ==
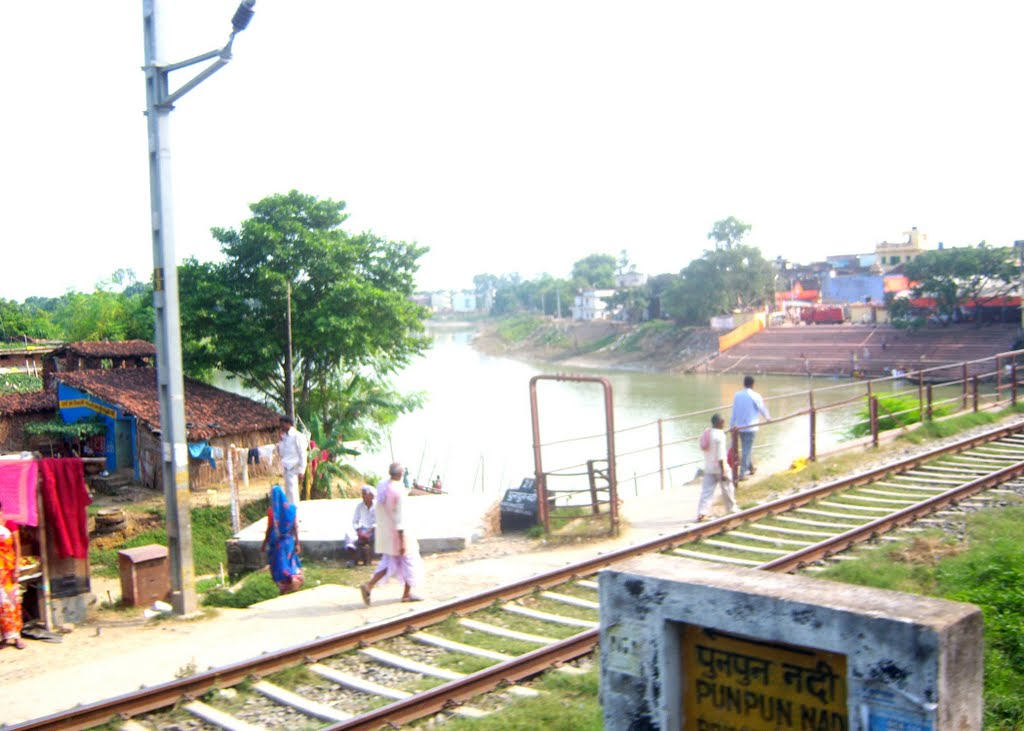
Punpun River

Masaurhi is located at 25°21′N 85°02′E. There are three rivers which nearly touch it. Namely, Dardha punpun and Morhar, these are dependent on rains. It is located 30 km from Patna, the capital of Bihar state.

The Punpun River is a big river which name come in ancient book. This river is mentioned in the Vayu and the Padma Puranas in connection with Gaya Mahatmya as the Punah-punah (again and again) of which Pun-Pun is the colloquial form. The river might have been called by this name because it was frequently in spate. The Puranas interpret the word Punahpuna in a spiritual sense, i.e., sins are removed again and again by offering oblations to the Pitras (forefathers) in the river.

== Administration ==
The Masaurhi sub-division (Tehsil) is headed by an IAS or state Civil service officer of the rank of Sub Divisional Magistrate (SDM).

=== Blocks ===
The Masaurhi Tehsil is divided into 3 Blocks, each headed by a Block Development Officer (BDO). List of Blocks is as follows:

1. Masaurhi
2. Punpun
3. Dhanarua

== Politics ==
Masaurhi is part of the Masaurhi Assembly constituency under the Pataliputra Lok Sabha constituency.

189 Masaurhi (SC) assembly constituency covers Masaurhi and Dhanarua community development blocks.

== Education ==
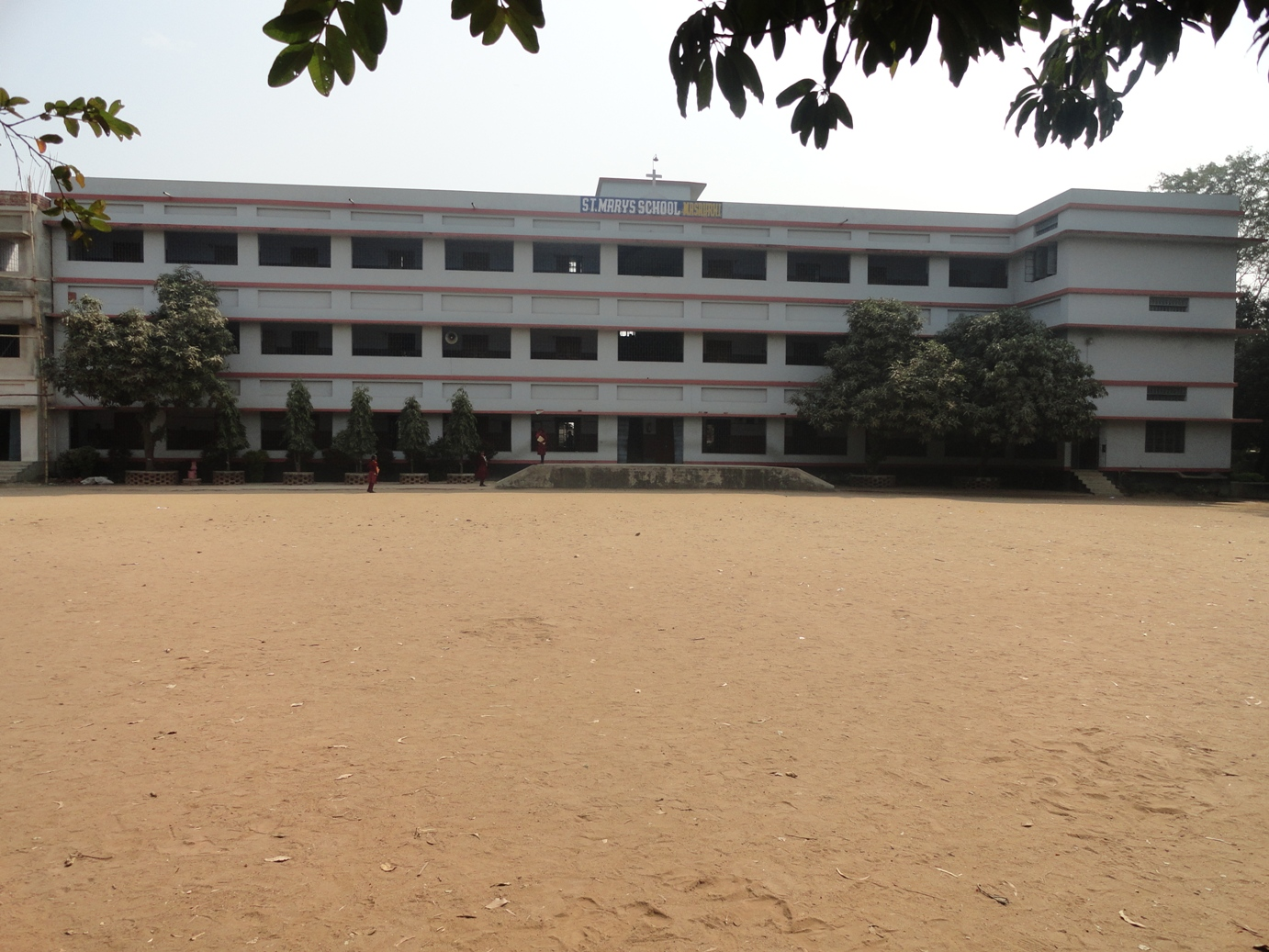
St Mary school

Masaurhi is a conglomerate of a rural sub-urban population. Student from nearby areas take trains and buses to come to Masaurhi. There are numerous govt and private schools in Masaurhi.

There are three semi-government colleges:

- S. M. G. K. High School
- Govt. I.T.I Masaurhi
- D.N. College
- P.L.S. College
- B.L.P College
- R.R.P. College
- Nawal Kishore Balika High School

There are many private schools affiliated with CBSE Delhi.

- St mary's school
- P.P.Public School
- Guidance Public School
- Kinesis Public School
- BVN School
- Delhi Central Public School
- DOON GLOBAL SCHOOL

== Entertainment ==
There is a movie theatre, named Sandhya Talkies. There are many playing grounds in Masaurhi, one of them is The Historical Gandhi Maidan (not to be confused with the one in Patna) and has its historical significance for the arrival of Mahatma Gandhi in late 1930s.

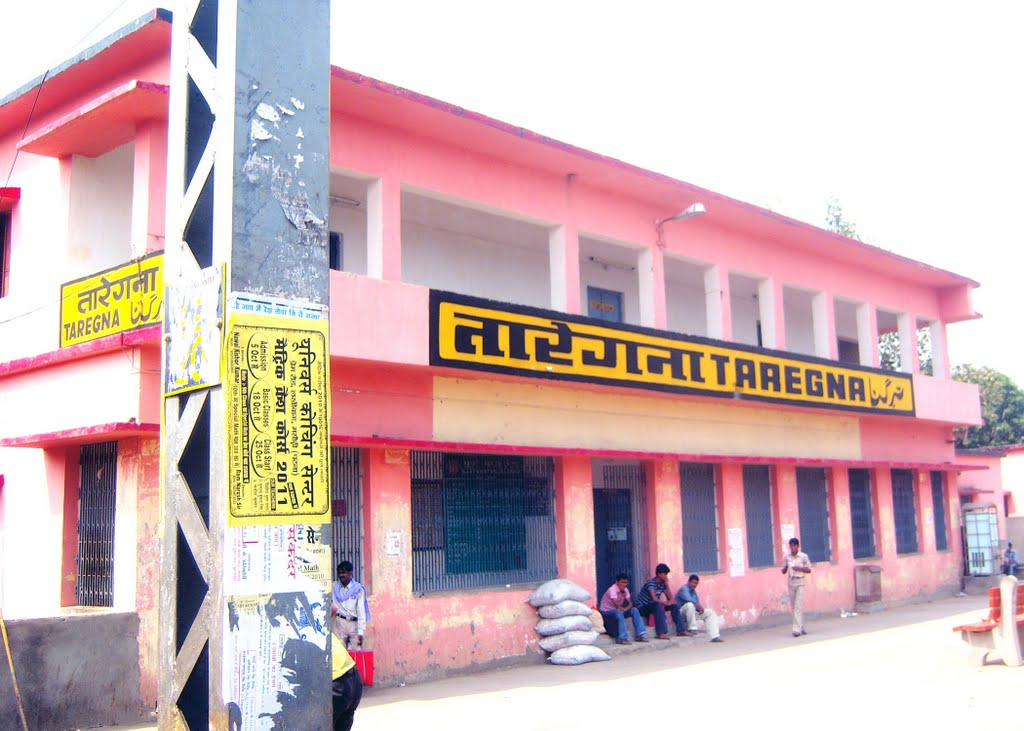
Taregna

== Festival ==
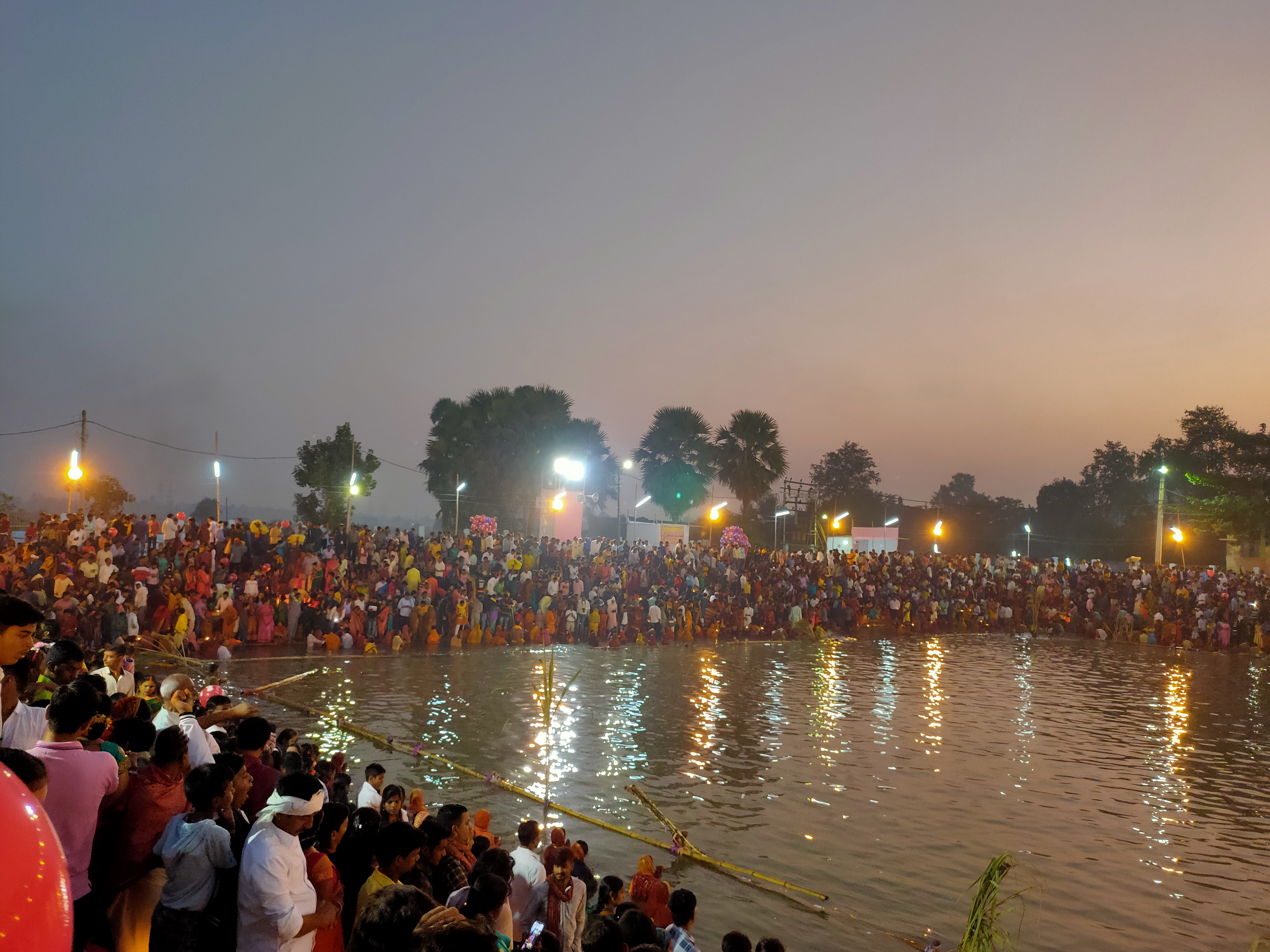
manichak ghat

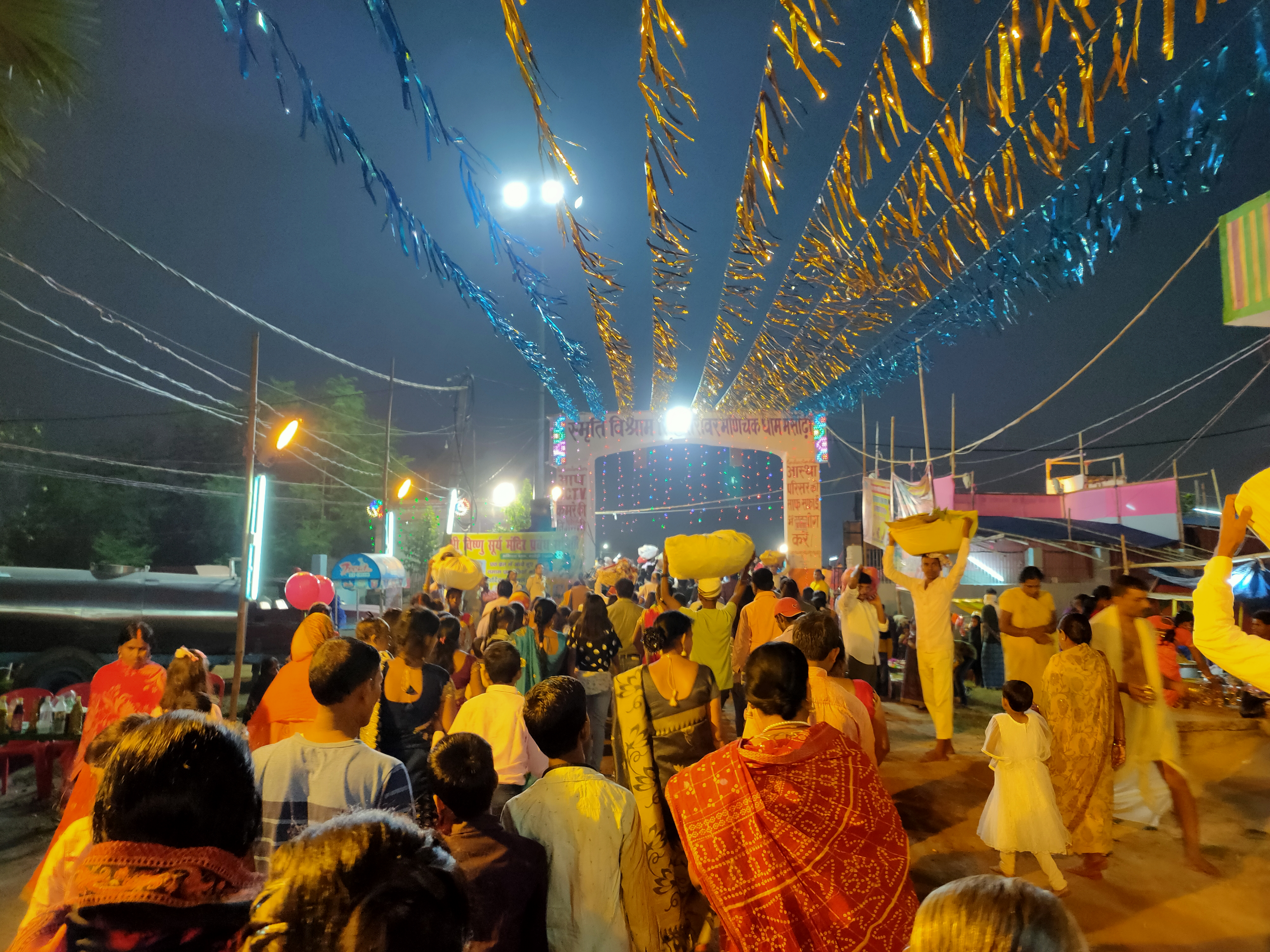
Chhath festival

Chhath is very important festival of this region. Masaurhi' manichak Sun Temple is very old and famous temple. There is one pond where people offering Chhath ritual. Masaurhi is mostly driven by social harmony of Hindu and Muslim culture. Both observes own festival in large scale.

== Transport ==
Masaurhi is connected with road and rail. It is only 30 km south from Patna and can be reached through National Highway 83. Nearest airport is Jay Prakash Narayan Airport, Patna.

=== Roadways ===
The subdivision is connected with neighbouring subdivision, districts and with major cities outside the state. National Highway No.83 (Patna—Masaurhi–Jehanabad–Gaya–Bodhgaya–Dobhi) and State Highway No.1 passes through the Subdivision. National Highway no. 83 is a part of Budhha circuit road. Masaurhi–Pali Road, Masaurhi–Ekangarsaray–Biharsharif Road is also a very important road. There are three bus stations in Masaurhi:

- East bus station - for Jehanabad, Gaya via NH-83. For Patna, Dhanarua, Paveri, Gaurichak via SH-1.
- Taregna bus station - for Nadwan, Pothi, Punpun, Mithapur, Patna via NH-83
- West bus station - for Noorah, Pitmas, Vikram Patna, For Pali via Masaurhi–Pali state highway road.

=== Railways ===
Masaurhi is major railway station in Patna–gaya railway line. Masaurhi is known as Taregna Railway station code TEA.

=== Major Landmarks ===
- Masaurhi Nagar Parishad
- Masaurhi Court
- Masaurhi Police Station
- Masaurhi Post Office
- Masaurhi Registry Office
- Tara press Masaurhi
- Masaurhi Thakurbari
- Masaurhi Gandhi Maidan
- Karpuri Chawk
- Nalanda Medical Hall
- St. Mary's School
- Vijay Market
- Masaurhi SBI Branch
- Reliance Shopping Mart
- M Bazaar Shopping Mall

== 22 July 2009 solar eclipse ==
Taregna (Masaurhi) experienced a sudden load of visitors coming to the village to see the solar eclipse of July 22, 2009, as, according to various sources, it was one of the best locations within the path of totality to watch it. It was reported that the solar eclipse should be visible for at least three minutes and 38 seconds from Taregana but the maximum duration six minutes 38 seconds in the Pacific Ocean. However, the eclipse was obscured by heavy cloud cover.

== See also ==
- Taregna
- Pataliputra
- Paliganj
- Bikram

== Near Villages ==
- Koriyawan
- Rewan
- Barni
- Kosut
- Kharauna ( Near Morhar)
- Murad Chak
- Jattichak
- Hansadih
- Noora
- Nahwan
- Sakarpura
- Nasirnachak
- Damrichaka
- Basaurhi, Kadirganj
- Dipkula
- Gurubalchak
- Berra
- Bhakhra
- Bara
- Bhagwanganj
- Bhajaur
- Bhadaura
