= Outline of Bihar =

State in Eastern India

Location of Bihar

The following outline is provided as an overview of and topical guide to Bihar:

Bihar – state in East India. It is the 13th largest state in India, with an area of 94,163 km^{2} (36,357 sq mi) and the 3rd largest by population; its population is the fastest-growing of any state.

Seal of Bihar

== General reference ==
=== Names ===
- Common English country name(s): Bihar
  - Pronunciation
    - English /bɪˈhɑːr/
    - Hindi pronunciation: [bɪˈɦaːr]
- Official English country name(s): State of Bihar
- Nickname(s):
- Adjectival(s): Bihari
- Demonym(s): Biharis

=== Rankings (amongst India's states) ===
- by population: 3rd
- by area (2011 census): 13th
- by crime rate (2015): 19th
- by gross domestic product (GDP) (2014): 11th
- by Human Development Index (HDI):
- by life expectancy at birth:
- by literacy rate:

== Geography of Bihar ==
Geography of Bihar

- Bihar is: an Indian state
- Population of Bihar:
- Area of Bihar:
- Atlas of Bihar

=== Location of Bihar ===
- Bihar is situated within the following regions:
  - Northern Hemisphere
  - Eastern Hemisphere
    - Eurasia
      - Asia
        - South Asia
          - Indian subcontinent
            - India
              - East India
- Time zone: Indian Standard Time (UTC+05:30)

=== Environment of Bihar ===
- Climate of Bihar
- Protected areas of Bihar
- Wildlife of Bihar
  - Flora of Bihar
  - Fauna of Bihar

==== Natural geographic features of Bihar ====
- Islands of Bihar
- Lakes of Bihar
- Mountains of Bihar
  - Volcanoes in Bihar
- Rivers of Bihar
  - Waterfalls of Bihar
- Valleys of Bihar

=== Regions of Bihar ===
Regions of Bihar

- North Bihar

==== Administrative divisions of Bihar ====
- Divisions of Bihar
  - Districts of Bihar
    - Municipalities of Bihar

===== Divisions of Bihar =====
Divisions of Bihar

===== Districts of Bihar =====
Districts of Bihar

===== Municipalities of Bihar =====
Municipalities of Bihar

- Capital of Bihar: Patna
- Cities of Bihar
- Villages of Bihar

=== Demography of Bihar ===
Demographics of Bihar

== Government and politics of Bihar ==
Politics of Bihar

- Form of government:
- Capital of Bihar: Capital of Bihar
- Political parties in Bihar
- List of politicians from Bihar

=== Elections in Bihar ===
Elections in Bihar

- 1952 Bihar Legislative Assembly election
- 1962 Bihar Legislative Assembly election
- 1985 Bihar Legislative Assembly election
- 1990 Bihar Legislative Assembly election
- 1995 Bihar Legislative Assembly election
- 2000 Bihar Legislative Assembly election
- February 2005 Bihar Legislative Assembly election
- October 2005 Bihar Legislative Assembly election
- 2010 Bihar Legislative Assembly election
- 2015 Bihar Legislative Assembly election
- 2020 Bihar Legislative Assembly election

=== Union government in Bihar ===
- Rajya Sabha members from Bihar
- Bihar Pradesh Congress Committee
- 1971 Indian general election in Bihar
- 1977 Indian general election in Bihar
- 2004 Indian general election in Bihar
- 2009 Indian general election in Bihar
- 2014 Indian general election in Bihar
- 2019 Indian general election in Bihar
- 2024 Indian general election in Bihar

=== Branches of the government of Bihar ===
Government of Bihar

==== Executive branch of the government of Bihar ====
- Head of state: Governor of Bihar,
- Head of government: Chief Minister of Bihar,
- Cabinet of Bihar

==== Legislative branch of the government of Bihar ====
- Bihar Legislature (bicameral)
  - Upper house: Legislative Council of Bihar
  - Lower house: Legislative Assembly of Bihar

==== Judicial branch of the government of Bihar ====
- Patna High Court

=== Law and order in Bihar ===
Law of Bihar

- Capital punishment in Bihar
- Crime in Bihar
  - Organized crime in Bihar
- Law enforcement in Bihar
- Penal system of Bihar
- Bihar Police

== History of Bihar ==
History of Bihar

=== History of Bihar, by period ===
- Timeline of Bihar

==== Ancient Bihar ====
- Anga
- Magadha
  - Vaishali
  - Haryanka dynasty
    - Bimbisara
    - Ajatashatru
    - Rajgir
    - Aryabhata
  - Pataliputra
  - Nanda Dynasty
  - Maurya Empire
    - Chandragupta Maurya
    - Chanakya
      - Arthashastra
    - Bindusara
    - Ashoka the Great
      - Promotion of Buddhism
      - Edicts of Ashoka
        - Ashoka Chakra
      - Lion Capital of Ashoka
  - Sunga Empire
  - Kanva dynasty
- Gupta Empire
  - Chandragupta I
  - Samudragupta
  - Chandragupta II

==== Contemporary Bihar ====
- 2015 Bihar political crisis

=== History of Bihar, by subject ===
- Earthquakes in Bihar
  - 1934 Nepal–Bihar earthquake
- Floods in Bihar
  - 1987 Bihar flood
  - 2004 Bihar flood
  - 2007 Bihar flood
  - 2008 Bihar flood
  - 2013 Bihar Flood
- Terrorist attacks in Bihar
  - 2008 attacks on Uttar Pradeshi and Bihari migrants in Maharashtra
  - 2013 Bihar Maoist attack

== Culture of Bihar ==
Culture of Bihar

- Architecture of Bihar
- Cuisine of Bihar
- Ethnic minorities in Bihar
- Festivals in Bihar
- Humor in Bihar
- Languages of Bihar
- Media in Bihar
- Prostitution in Bihar
- Public holidays in Bihar
- Records of Bihar
- World Heritage Sites in Bihar

=== The arts in Bihar ===
- Art in Bihar
- Cinema of Bihar
- Literature of Bihar
- Music of Bihar
- Television in Bihar
- Theatre in Bihar

=== People of Bihar ===
People of Bihar

- List of people from Bihar
- List of politicians from Bihar

=== Religion in Bihar ===
Religion in Bihar

- Buddhism in Bihar
- Christianity in Bihar
- Hinduism in Bihar
- Islam in Bihar
- Judaism in Bihar
- Jainism in Bihar

=== Sports in Bihar ===
Sports in Bihar

- Cricket in Bihar
- Football in Bihar

=== Symbols of Bihar ===
Symbols of Bihar

- State animal: Gaur
- State bird: House sparrow
- State flower:
- State seal: Seal of Bihar
- State symbol:
- State tree:

== Economy and infrastructure of Bihar ==
Economy of Bihar

- Economic rank (by nominal GDP):
- Agriculture in Bihar
- Banking in Bihar
  - National Bank of Bihar
- Communications in Bihar
  - Internet in Bihar
  - Media in Bihar
- Companies of Bihar
- Currency of Bihar:
- Economic history of Bihar
- Energy in Bihar
  - Energy policy of Bihar
  - Oil industry in Bihar
- Health care in Bihar
- Mining in Bihar
- Bihar Stock Exchange
- Tourism in Bihar
- Transport in Bihar
  - Airports in Bihar
  - Rail transport in Bihar
    - Bukhtiarpur Bihar Light Railway
    - Bihar Sampark Kranti Superfast Express
    - Patna Metro
  - Roads in Bihar
    - National Highways in Bihar
    - State highways in Bihar
      - State Highway 48 (Bihar)
      - State Highway 49 (Bihar)
      - State Highway 74 (Bihar)

== Health and safety in Bihar ==
- Water supply and sanitation in Bihar

== Education in Bihar ==
Education in Bihar

- List of museums in Bihar
- Literacy In Bihar
- List of institutions of higher education in Bihar
  - Central University of South Bihar
  - Indian Institute of Technology Patna,
  - Indian Institute of Management Bodh Gaya
  - AIIMS, Patna
  - National Institute of Technology, Patna
  - IIIT Bhagalpur
  - National Institute of Pharmaceutical Education and Research, Hajipur(NIPER Hajipur) and
  - Nalanda University.

== See also ==
- List of international rankings
- Outline of geography
- Adapur Bihar
- Administration in Bihar
- Ahe Dayamaya Biswa Bihari
- Arun Pathak (Bihari politician)
- Association of Bihar Cricket
- Atal Bihari Vajpayee
- Atal Bihari Vajpayee Hindi Vishwavidyalaya
- Atal Bihari Vajpayee Stadium
- Aurangabad (Bihar Lok Sabha constituency)
- Aurangabad district, Bihar
- Babasaheb Bhimrao Ambedkar Bihar University
- Banke Bihari Temple
- Bari Sangat Bihar
- Bayt al-Bihar
- Bengal Orissa Bihar Baptist Convention
- Bihar 996
- Bihar Agricultural University
- Bihar Colony
- Bihar Cricket Association
- Bihar Diwas
- Bihar Light Horse
- Bihar Mennonite Mandli
- Bihar Movement
- Bihar Museum
- Bihar National College
- Bihar Province
- Bihar Public Service Commission
- Bihar Regiment
- Bihar Reorganisation Act, 2000
- Bihar School Examination Board
- Bihar School of Yoga
- Bihar Sharif
- Bihar State Tourism Development Corporation
- Bihar Times
- Bihar Urban Infrastructure Development Corporation
- Bihar Vikas Party
- Bihar al-Anwar
- Bihar cricket team
- Bihar famine of 1873–74
- Bihari (disambiguation)
- Bihari Hindi
- Bihari Lal
- Bihari Mauritian
- Bihari Muslims
- Bihari brothers
- Bihari hindi
- Bihari languages
- Bihari literature
- Biharinath
- Biharipur
- Biharis
- Biharkeresztes
- Biharmonic Bézier surface
- Biharmonic equation
- Biharnagybajom
- Biharsharif (Vidhan Sabha constituency)
- Bihartorda
- Biharugra
- Biharwe
- Biharwe Division
- Biharwe F.C.
- Biman Bihari Das
- Binod Bihari Chowdhury
- Brahmapur, Bihar
- Bridges in Bihar
- Brij Bihari Chaubey
- Brij Bihari Pandey
- DD Bihar
- Digvijay Singh (Bihar)
- ETV Bihar
- Electoral history of Atal Bihari Vajpayee
- Ferenc Bihar
- Floods in Bihar
- Girish Bihari
- Gola Bazar, Bihar
- HMIS Bihar (J247)
- Hajdú-Bihar County
- Hindi in Bihar
- János Bihari
- József Bihari
- Kunj Bihari Lal Rathi
- Lal Bihari
- List of chief ministers of Bihar
- List of deputy chief ministers of Bihar
- List of finance ministers of Bihar
- List of governors of Bihar
- List of governors of Bihar and Orissa Province
- List of Monuments of National Importance in Bihar
- List of State Protected Monuments in Bihar
- List of cities in Bihar by population
- List of constituencies of Bihar Legislative Assembly
- Malik clan (Bihar)
- Nalanda College Biharsharif
- Rajendra Nagar Bihar – Indore Express
- Pathans in Bihar
- Persecution of Biharis in Bangladesh
- Premiership of Atal Bihari Vajpayee
- Pulin Bihari Baske
- Pune Via Bihar
- Rahas Bihari Dwivedi
- Raj Bhavan (Bihar)
- Rajnagar Bihar
- S. H. Bihari
- Shaikh of Bihar
- Shita Coat Bihar, Nawabganj
- Shoshit Seva Sangh
- Shyam Bihari Misra
- State Mahadalit Commission, Bihar
- Sándor Bihari
- Uttar Bihar Gramin Bank
