= Mihir Bhatt =

Indian architect, researcher

Mihir R Bhatt
- Born: Ahmedabad, Gujarat, India
- Education: Undergraduate in architecture at CEPT, Ahmedabad Postgraduate in Urban and regional planning at the School of Planning and Architecture, Delhi Postgraduate Urban Studies at the Massachusetts Institute of Technology, USA.
- Occupation: Director of all india disaster mitigation institute (aidmi)
- Known for: Founding of All India Disaster Mitigation Institute (AIDMI)
- Spouse: Reema Nanavaty
- Parents: Ramesh Bhatt (father); Ela Bhatt (mother)

Mihir R Bhatt is an Indian architect, researcher and urban planner based in Ahmedabad, Gujarat, India. He is the director of the All India Disaster Mitigation Institute (AIDMI), a local organization dedicated to mitigating the impact of disaster risks in India. Mihir Bhatt is actively involved in cutting edge initiatives and projects aimed at reducing risks and enhancing disaster preparedness and has extensive publications on topics related to vulnerability and disaster.

== Early life and education ==
Mihir Bhatt was born in Ahmedabad, India from his social entrepreneur mother Ela Bhatt, founder of SEWA, and his father Ramesh Bhatt, a professor of economics. Studied his undergraduate in architecture at CEPT University, Ahmedabad, and his post-graduate in Urban and regional planning at the School of Planning and Architecture, Delhi. He won scholarship for Urban Studies at the Massachusetts Institute of Technology, US.

== Personal life ==
Mihir Bhatt married to Reema Nanavaty of SEWA (Self-Employed Women's Association of India). They have two sons, Somnath and Rameshwar.

== Career ==
Following his completion of postgraduate studies in Delhi, Mihir engaged in various projects with architects Anand, Apte, and Jhabvala, aimed at improving different aspects of communities such as the revamping of street markets to better serve vendors and hawkers, the establishment of day-care centers catering to the children of rural laborers, the development of innovative designs for watershed management, two exhibitions for International Trade Fair Authority of India and the construction of a new township in Punjab. Later he went to Boston, USA to pursue his education at Massachusetts Institute of Technology. While he was in US he teamed up with two others and started a business enterprise, Global View Inc., to promote international television programming, which Mihir later sold it and returned to India.

Upon his return, Mihir R. Bhatt joined Christopher Benninger to head Institute for Habitat and Environment (IHE) in Pune, where he introduced pioneering projects in environment smart urban governance that received funding from the World Bank, UN, and national banks. In 1990, he founded the Disaster Mitigation Institute in his hometown of Ahmedabad.

Mihir R. Bhatt's contributions extend to international platforms: he served as a member of the panel responsible for selecting Humanitarian Coordinators for the United Nations, held an advisory role in the Climate Development Knowledge Network, concentrating on climate-compatible development in nine Indian states, particularly in the areas of urban resilience, green finance, and renewable energy at the subnational level. He twice chaired Duryog Nivaran, a South Asian network that fosters alternative thinking on disaster risk reduction.

In his position as CDKN's Country Engagement head for India, Mihir R. Bhatt used high-quality evidence and tools to incorporate climate challenges into India's national economic policies, plans, and practices. He is also an advisory member of GRRIPP South Asia, contributing to the planning of projects, programs, and strategies that address the interlinkages between gender, intersectionality, and disaster risk reduction in South Asia. Furthermore, Mihir played a founding role in Sphere India, an organization dedicated to developing and contextualizing minimum humanitarian standards in collaboration with affected populations. He has also played his role in strengthening the humanitarian system in India through his work with Sphere India and the World Food Programme.

Currently, Mihir R. Bhatt serves as a fellow at the FXB Center for Health and Human Rights, Harvard School of Public Health, and the Salata Institute.

== Awards and recognition ==
- Received the Russell E. Train Institutional Fellowship for planning work on environment;
- Eisenhower Fellowship for promoting local leadership
- Ashoka International Fellowship for designing social enterprise for micro-insurance for disaster victims.
