= Ramakrushna Nanda =

Indian (Odia) Writer

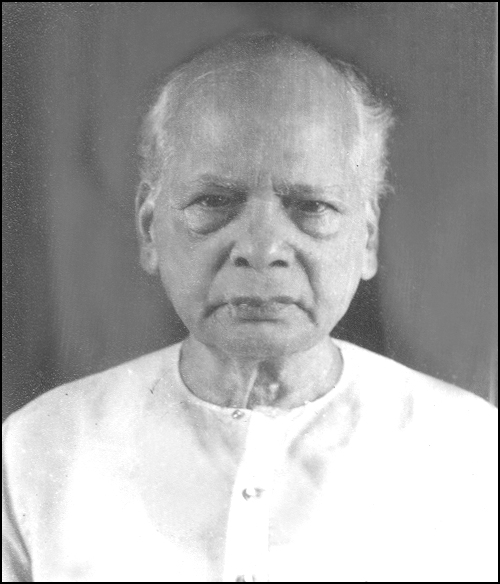
- Nanda during 1990s at Cuttack
- Born: 15 February 1906; Bairoi, Bengal Presidency, British India
- Died: 28 October 1994 (aged 88); Cuttack, Orissa, India
- Occupation: Teacher
- Spouse: Saudamini Devi
- Writing career
- Language: Odia
- Notable work: Ahe Dayamaya Biswa Bihari

Ramakrushna Nanda (15 February 1906 – 28 October 1994) was an Indian writer, educator and author of children's literature. He composed the song Ahe Dayamaya Biswa Bihari, a favourite of Mahatma Gandhi when Gandhi was at Sabarmati Ashram. This song was included in his Odia-language textbook Sahitya Sopana.

== Biography ==
=== Family ===
Nanda's father was Madhusudan Nanda (died 1892). His mother died in 1951. In 1925, Nanda married Soudamini Devi (d. 13 August 1988). They had eight daughters and one son. Nanda's elder brother was Balakrushna Nanda (teacher) and younger brothers were Radhakrushna Nanda (an eminent Drama writer cum artist and owner of Ichhapur Jatra Mandali, writer of many drama books and Niyati songs) and Dinakrushna Nanda.

His son is Er Prabhat Kumar Nanda, a retired Chief Engineer (Water Resources Dept) and was also Member OPSC. His daughter-in-law is Smt Anasuya Nanda, who is an eminent writer and singer. She is the editor of the Odia Children's magazine Sansar (founded by Ramakrushna Nanda).

=== Education ===
Nanda was born at Bairoi village of Cuttack District in Odisha and educated in the village of Kantapada, and at the Ravenshaw collegiate school, Cuttack. He wrote for a school magazine, Chandrika. At the time of Independence of India, Nanda was inspired by a local leader, Gopobandhu and became a Swecha Sebaka, a volunteer. He stayed in Alkasrama,until continuing his studies at Satybadi Jatiya Bidyalaya, where he learnt Devnagiri, a type of Indian alphabet. Nanda also matriculated from the English medium school and later received a bachelor of education.

=== Career ===
Nanda began his career as a teacher at Banki school. He was then, for six years, an assistant teacher at Baripada high school. In 1933, Nanda became a social worker. He began a local welfare organization called Narayan Samiti. He was also a headmaster at Bhingarpur high school.

== Writing ==
Nanda's first textbook in the Odia language was Sahitya Sopana. In 1946, he left his job and came back to Cuttack. On 21 July 1947, Nanda opened Parijata press. In August 1952, he began the Sansar magazine. The press closed in 1961. In retirement, Nanda wrote children's books and songs. Of the form nanabaya, (nonsense rhyme), Nanda said,"

"Unintelligibility or irrelevance does not reduce the value of nanbaya. The rhythm and style is unique. Sometimes the meanings are unclear or impossible to ascertain. In English, some of these rhymes are called 'nonsense' or meaningless rhymes. By defying the metrical prescriptions and grammatical conventions, the spontaneity of these rhymes endear themselves to children."

== Lyricist ==
Nanda's lyrics for Aahe Dayamaya Bishwa Bihari and Holi Holi Re Holi Ranga Rangeli Nali. were used in the 1978 film, Balidaan .

== Bibliography ==
- 1930 – Tulsidas
- 1931 – Tulsidas Dohabali
- 1933 – Pratidhwani
- 1934 – 37 – Sahitya Sopana
- 1938 – Sahitya Bodha
- 1940 – Rachna Darpana
- 1944 – 45 – Patha Sopana
- 1936–46 – Sangram O Sadhana (Part 1 and Part 2)
- 1948 – Don Quixoti ( Translation )
- 1949 – Bigyanara Kuhuka
- 1962 – Biswa Parichaya (Oriya Bhasa Kosha)
- 1969 – Jibana Taranga.
- 1975 – Jhumuka
- 1977–84 – Chaati Gacha series (Athara Phula, Kodie Phula, Baisi Phula, Teisi Phula, Chabisi Phula, Subarna Seu, Marana Doli, Sagara Kanya)
- 1982 – Oriya Sishu sahitya and sangita Sankalana
- 1982 – Prakurtira Galpapuri
- 1982 – Indradhanu (translation)
- 1983 – Ama Bana Jangala Katha (translation)
- 1983 – Ama Sarira (translation)
- 1984 – Suna Pahacha
- 1984 – Ama Jatiya Pasu, Jatiya Pakhi
- 1985 – Ama Jatiya Pataka O Jatiya Sangita, Jatiya Puspa O Jatiya Pratika
- 1986 – Jibana Rahasya
- 1988 – Ratna Pakhuda (Part 1 and Part 2)
- 1989 – Satra Phula
- 1989 – Adekha Banara Phula
- 1989 – Pachatantra Kahani (Part 1, 2 and 3)
- 1992 – Lekhanira Pathasala
- 1993 – Bhabi Dekhantu
- 1994 – Tuntunira Bahi
- 1994 – Biswa Parichaya (2nd edition)

== See also ==
- List of Indian poets
- Odia literature
- Odia language
