= Bairoi =

- Village
- Location within Odisha
- Coordinates: 20.239315°N 85.986566°E
- Country: India
- State: Orissa
- District: Cuttack

Government
  - Type: Panchayat

Population (2011)
  - Total: 50,000

Languages
  - Official: Hindu
- Time zone: UTC+5:30 (IST)
- PIN: 754010

Bairoi (Olatpur) is a village situated 17 km from Phul Nakhara and 30 km from Cuttack and Bhubaneswar in Orissa, India. It is the birthplace of Ramakrushna Nanda, the grandfather of Manoranjan Nanda, a writer and social worker.

== Demographics ==
Bairoi has a population of 50,000 including males and females. Bairoi has an average literacy rate of 85%.
