= 2004 Bihar flood =

Flood in Bihar, India

- Location: Bihar
- Deaths: 885 human and 3272 animals
- Property damage: ₹1,03,049.60 INR (Approx. $1875.5 USD)

The 2004 Bihar flood was one of the worst floods in Bihar, India in a decade. 885 people and 3272 animals had lost their lives and nearly 21.299 million human were affected. 20 districts of Bihar were affected. An alarming rise in water level due to heavy rains inundated fresh areas in Bhagalpur district, Begusarai district, Katihar district, Darbhanga district, Samastipur district and Khagaria district. According to the Central Water Commission Bagmati, Budhi Gandak, Kamla Balan, Adhwara, Kosi and Mahananda rivers were flowing above the red mark at various places, while the Ganges crossed the danger mark for the first time at Farakka Barrage.

In Darbhanga, Electricity, Telecommunication, fresh Water Supply was hampered for 3 Months.

== See also ==
- 2008 Bihar flood
- 2008 Indian floods
- Koshi River
- Floods in Bihar
- 2007 Bihar flood
