= South Asia Disaster Report =

2006 Geographical report on disasters in Southern Asia

South Asia Disaster Report is a 2006 report by Duryog Nivaran, edited by Amjad Bhatti and others, and subtitled Tackling the Tides and Tremors. It looks at disasters affecting the South Asian region's "countries and communities (that) are connected to each other geologically, geographically and culturally".

== 2005 report ==
The report, covering 2005, has Pakistani journalist Amjad Bhatti as its co-ordinating editor. Bhatti is from the Duryog Nivaran Secretariat at Islamabad. He has argued that the report brings together "insights and experiences" of members of the Duryog Nivaran network in South Asia who have been "engaged in exploring and addressing the social dimensions of 'natural disasters' in South Asia."

In this seven chapter book, the themes looked at include whether disasters in South Asia are "destined or designed". Other chapters look at whether "disasters discriminate"; and offer in-depth focus on the Kashmir earthquake, the tsunami in Sri Lanka, the Mumbai monsoon floods of 2005, "dand ownplayed disasters" of 2005. Other themes tackled include disaster risk reduction in South Asia and the emerging issues, options and lessons.

== South Asia, and its relevance ==
Covering seven nations (Bangladesh, Bhutan, India, Maldives, Nepal, Pakistan and Sri Lanka, South Asia is a region sensitive to disasters, points out this report. The region has exhausted its land reserves, and is farming soils that are unsuitable for cultivation. Some 35% of productive land is affected by land degradation. South Asia has a population that is vulnerable to risks in terms of sudden fluctuations in markets and natural shocks arising from weather. This region is also marked by high disparities in income, health and education.

Says the study (p. 1): "2004-5 was the most appalling period in the history of South Asia. The region became a neighbourhood of disasters." Besides recurring flood and drought, it also had to cope with the December 2004 tsunami (specially in coastal Sri Lanka, India, Thailand and Indonesia). There was the October 2005 earthquake in the Himalayan range that killed of 75,000.

== "Understanding issues" ==
In its first report, this intended series "seeks to understand" issues such as:

- How hazards turn into disasters
- What were the consequences of the Indian Ocean tsunami of December 2004, the Himalayan earthquake of October 2005, the Mumbai floods of July 2005, on people, infrastructure and development.
- How did the State and non-state "actors", including the local and international communities respond to these major natural disasters,
- Why some disasters are reported prominently and some remain invisible,
- What are the existing institutional arrangements to address complex emergencies in South Asia, and
- What could be an alternative framework for effective disaster risk reduction in the region.

== Contributors ==
Core contributors for the 2005 report are Madhavi Malalgoda Ariyabandhu, Dilrukshi Fonseka, Mushtaq Gadi of the Sindhu Bacha'ao Tarla in Pakistan, Dr. Vishaka Hidellage, Louise Platt of Practical Action's South Asia Programme, and Chandrani Bandyopadhyay of the National Institute of Disaster Management (NIDM) in India.

Behind this report were the Duryog Nivaran network working to promote "an alternative perspective on disasters and vulnerability as a basis for disaster mitigation in the region"; Practical Action (formerly called the ITDG) and an international development agency promoting appropriate technology to fight poverty begun by economist and author of Small Is Beautiful E. F. Schumacher; and the Rural Development Policy Institute (RDPI), a civil initiative aimed to stimulate public dialogue.

== Annexures ==
This (2005) book has a series of annexures—a statistical summary of disasters in South Asia, covering 2005; numbers of deaths in South Asia, by country and by disaster type; number of disasters that occurred, by country and disaster type; number of disasters that occurred, by country, in 2005; percentage of people killed, by natural disaster category, in 2004 and 2005; "top-ten"global disaster killers; the countries most hit by natural disasters across the globe in 2005 (China tops, with India second, the United States in third place, and Afghanistan in fourth. Bangladesh and Pakistan follow in fifth and sixth position); time-trends in natural disasters between 1975 and 2005; and the annual reported economic damages from natural disasters, between 1975 and 2005. There are also a couple of more annexures, on the human impact by disaster type, and the natural disaster occurrence by disaster type, both of which compare 2004 and 2005 figures.
