= All India Disaster Mitigation Institute =

NGO registered in India

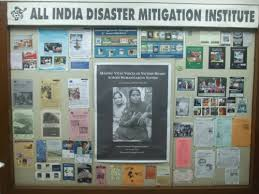
Photo from AIDMI's registered office at Ahmedabad.

The All India Disaster Mitigation Institute (AIDMI) is a NGO registered in India. Located at Ahmedabad, Gujarat, India, it works on disaster risk reduction, climate change adaptation and disaster mitigation. It is a community-based; action planning, action research and advocacy organization, working towards bridging the gap between policy, practice and research related to disaster mitigation. AIDMI have been working on six pillars: (i) Awareness generation, (ii) Capacity building, (iii) Policy advocacy, (iv) Direct implementation, (v) Research and publications, and (vi) Networking.

== History of the organization ==
AIDMI was founded by Mihir R Bhatt in response to the repeated 1987 – 89 droughts in India. After pursued his degree in Cambridge, UK and Washington DC, USA, upon returning to India in 1989, Mihir R Bhatt initiated a project on disaster risk mitigation with other three team members. The project then evolved to an autonomous organization known as All India Disaster Mitigation Institute (AIDMI) as today.

=== Vision & Mission ===
AIDMI’s vision is to set up a strengthened community of the deprived and excluded citizens who are resilient to hazards, have their own coping mechanisms, are prepared to manage disaster recovery on their own, and have access public resources as their right.

Its mission is to mainstream disaster risk reduction (DRR) by turning disaster relief and rehabilitation measures into an opportunity for sustainable human security and poverty alleviation by supporting deprived and excluded citizens.

As an operational and learning organization, AIDMI works towards promoting Disaster Risk Mitigation and Adaptation to climate change risk by supporting, capturing, processing and disseminating disaster related information, lessons and innovative ideas as well as conducting stakeholder round tables, trainings of trainers, reviews, evaluations, and pilot projects.

Since the establishment, it has expanded its work over the years to cover nine types of disasters (including natural disasters and man-made disasters) in twelve areas of India and beyond to eight countries in Asia. AIDMI strives to link local communities to national and international levels of risk reduction, relief and long-term recovery policies and programs.

=== About the Founder ===
Mihir R. Bhatt studied and practiced architecture and city planning in Ahmedabad and Delhi, India, and later Cambridge and Washington DC, USA. He received Russell E. Train Institutional Fellowship from the World Wildlife Fund, USA (1997 for innovation in institution buildings); Eisenhower Fellowship, USA (2000 for leadership in humanitarian and disaster risk reduction efforts in India); and Ashoka International Fellowship, USA (2004 for social enterprise in mobilising resources). Some of Mihir’s work includes: evaluated tsunami recovery for Disaster Emergency Committee, UK; co-managed Local Capacity theme of Tsunami Evaluation Coalition, UK, advised NGO Impact Initiative of President Clinton’s tsunami recovery office; evaluated Oxfam International response in South India and Sri Lanka; mainstreamed Disaster Risk Reduction UNDP in Sri Lanka; evaluated UNDP’s Disaster Risk Mitigation Project in India covering 169 districts and 38 cities as well as the UN’s unified tsunami response coordinated by the UNDP.

He is a Senior Fellow of Humanitarian Initiatives at Harvard University, USA, full Member of ALNAP and a member of the Civil Society Advisory Committee of Commonwealth Foundation, UK and Author to IPCC’s special report on extreme events. He is also founding member of International Humanitarian Studies Association, Netherlands.

== AIDMI’s work ==
AIDMI has responded to several large-scale disasters. These include the 2001 Gujarat earthquake, the 2004 Indian Ocean tsunami, the 2005 Kashmir earthquake, the 2005 and 2006 Gujarat floods, the 2007 and 2008 Bihar floods, the 2007 cyclone Sidr in Bangladesh, the 2008 cyclone Nargis in Myanmar, the 2010 Leh cloud burst, the 2011 Odisha floods, the 2011 Sikkim earthquake, the 2013 Cyclone Phailin, the 2014 Uttarakhand floods, the 2015 Nepal Earthquake, the 2015 Chennai floods, and recently the 2018 Kerala floods, along with many small local disasters and accidents.

During those events, AIDMI, along with other NGOs and government officers, provided relief and livelihood support for the victims and their families. In 1998, AIDMI introduced livelihood relief in humanitarian action in India, which argued relief should be provided with a focus on livelihood. Based on human security approach, AIDMI’s approach is to promote long-term recovery and community development focusing on food, water, shelter, and livelihood. 15,000 families and 9,000 habitats benefited from AIDMI’s livelihood recovery programs. In 1999, after the Kandla Cyclone, AIDMI advocated the Government of India to establish a national authority to coordinate response to natural and man-made disasters and for capacity-building in disaster resiliency and crisis response. It was not until 2005 that the National Disaster Management Authority (NDMA) was officially established through the Disaster Management Act enacted by the Government.

Besides, AIDMI has conducted over 28 research and evaluations of disaster risk management across South and Southeast Asia. Evaluations have been carried out in partnerships with the Adventist Development and Relief Agency (ADRA), Christian Aid, Concern Worldwide India, International Federation of Red Cross and Red Crescent Societies (IFRC), Department for International Development (DFID), Japan International Cooperation Agency (JICA), The United Nations Development Fund for Women (UNIFEM), Humanist Institute for Cooperation with Developing Countries (HIVOS), Government of India (GoI), UNDP EC, Oxfam UK, and the Tsunami Evaluation Coalition (TEC). These research and evaluations were to capture and share insights into how joint evaluations can improve accountability, ownership and management in favour of the poor and affected community.

=== Afat Vimo ===
“Afat Vimo” is a disaster insurance product offered by AIDMI, which covers both life and non-life losses. All India Disaster Mitigation Institute (AIDMI) was the first agency in India to design a combination of life and non-life disaster insurance product for disaster victims; through public insurance companies in 2004, supported by the ProVention Consortium. Since the first pilot in Gujarat, AIDMI has pioneered a series of action-learning pilots on disaster micro-insurance across India. The Afat Vimo (disaster insurance) scheme covering 19 types of disasters was first piloted in Gujarat in 2004 and was later extended to 2004 Indian Ocean tsunami victims in Tamil Nadu, and 2005 earthquake victims in Jammu and Kashmir. In 2011, the pilot scheme was extended to the floods and cyclone victims in Odisha; through Society for Women Action Development (SWAD) with support from European Union in partnership with Concern Worldwide India and later on in 2013 with support of Climate Development Knowledge Network (CDKN) the study on effectiveness of disaster insurance conducted.

The typical Afat Vimo client has assets worth Rs. 13,000 (US$285) with an annual income of Rs. 16,000-24,000 (US$350–525) and owns his/her micro-business. In exchange for a one-time upfront fee worth approximately three-day salary, Afat Vimo provides coverage on losses or damages to house, stock-in-trade, or loss of work due to accident and death of earning family member up to Rs. 75,000 (US$1,900). A follow-up study by AIDMI after Cyclone Phailin found that those who had purchased insurance were able to use the post-disaster liquidity it provided to rebuild their livelihoods. Those who did not have insurance had to hope for government or NGO support, or turn to moneylenders charging steep interest rates, which often locked them into an unsustainable spiral of high-interest debt. By transferring risk to the private sector, micro-insurance increased the capacity of communities to absorb shocks themselves.

=== Publication of Southasiadisaster.net ===
Southasiadisaster.net is a publication of AIDMI, naming Southasiadisasters.net (in English), Vipada Nivaran (in Hindi) and Afat Nivaran (in Gujarati). The publication has 176 issues up to Oct 2018, contributed from 692 writers belonging to 582 organizations from India and 39 countries, covering 17 disasters, spanning over 39 themes and 15 important national and international policy discourses. The list of the publications can be accessed from the website of the organisation.

== AIDMI in the Media ==
AIDMI has been featured in local and international newspaper (from April 2017 to Oct 2018)

The Hindu. (2017). How Ahmedabad beat the heat.

Conservations Today. (2017). Building back better.

Ahmedabad Mirror. (2018). We’ve all it takes to be a creative city.

Magazine of Middle East Institute. (2018). India and the Middle East: Common Areas of Action on the Sendai Framework.

Magazine of Middle East Institute. (2018). India and the Middle East: Building Joint Knowledge on Managing Sand and Dust Storms.

The Indian Express. (2018). AIDMI part of South Asia effort on disaster management.

Ahmedabad Mirror. (2018). High-rises to come under AMC scanner.

Ahmedabad Mirror. (2018). Early warning systems: AIDMI joins South Asia collaboration.

Navbharat Raipur City Edition. (2018). Special Attention on School Safety, Create outline
