= Agriculture of Bihar =

Agriculture sector in Bihar

Bihar lies in the river plains of the basin of the river Ganga. As a result, its land contains fertile alluvial soil and groundwater resources. This makes the agriculture of Bihar rich and diverse. Rice, wheat, and maize are the major cereal crops. Arhar, urad, moong, gram, pea, lentils, and khesari are some of the pulses cultivated in Bihar. Bihar is the fourth largest producer of vegetables, which is dominated by potato, onion, brinjal, and cauliflower. In fruit cultivation, it is the largest producer of litchi and the fourth largest producer of pineapple, as well as a major producer of mango, banana, and guava. Sugar cane and jute are two other major cash crops of Bihar.

== Bihar cropping system ==
The net sown area in Bihar is 60% of its geographical area. This percentage is much higher than the all-India average of 42%. Such a high percentage of cultivated land is possible for two reasons. First, most of Bihar is a plain area suitable for agriculture. Second, most of the forest had been converted into farmland during the past 2,000 years. Currently, land under forest constitutes only 6% of the area.

South Bihar is a productive agricultural center, while North Bihar is hindered by its flood and drought-prone geography. In the south, the Ahar-Pyne system of agriculture has long been used to cultivate crops.

== Food grains ==
Rice is cultivated in all districts of Bihar. Autumn rice, aghani rice, and summer rice are three different varieties of rice grown at three different times of the year. The average production of rice is around 5 million tonnes each year. Some five decades back, wheat cultivation was very restricted to western districts of Bihar. After green revolution success, wheat was planted by Bihari farmers on a larger scale, and wheat now occupies the status of major crop of the rabi (spring) season. The average annual wheat production is approximately 6-6.5 million tonnes. Maize is also cultivated, with an average annual production level of approximately 4-4.5 million tonnes and a steady positive trend in production. The leading producer districts are Khagaria and Saharsa. Pulses such as moong, arhar, peas, and khesari are grown, more in southern than in northern Bihar. The leading districts are Patna, Bhojpur, Aurangabad, and Nalanda.

== Horticulture ==
Bihar is one of the major producers of vegetables and fruits in India with 9.8 and 6.7 percent of national production respectively. It ranks third and sixth among other States in the production of vegetables and fruits respectively.

=== Fruticulture ===
Bihar is one of the largest producers of fruits and vegetables in the country. Bihar accounts for 71% of India's annual litchi production. Makhana cultivation is done in about 5000 hectares in the entire country, and produces 90% of the world's fox nuts. In fruit cultivation, the third largest producer of pineapple, as well as a major producer of mango, banana, and guava. Few Bihari Farmers are turning to strawberry cultivation for better economical return. Also, better economical return has attracted farmers to cultivate kamalam (dragon fruit). Corrigendum one of the world's costliest crop is now under cultivation in Bihar by few farmers.

=== Vegetables ===
The total area under vegetable cultivation is currently about 11% of the state's gross sown area, and is increasing. The important vegetable crops include potato, onion, tomato, cauliflower, and brinjal. Hajipur in Vaishali is famous for an early variety of cauliflower that reaches market in the last week of September. Production of vegetables is well dispersed over the districts, with a concentration of production in some particular districts. Apart from Patna and Nalanda (Jehanabad), where vegetable production is quite extensive, the other districts with high shares in total vegetable production are Vaishali, Muzaffarpur, West Champaran, East Champaran, Katihar, and Begusarai.

== Animal husbandry ==
=== Milk ===
The Dairy co-operative was founded in 1983 to coordinate the work of various local milk unions. The government opened Nalanda dairy in 2013 which is the Largest Automation-based Dairy Plant in Eastern India. The establishment of Sudha was a result of White Revolution. In January 2021, the organisation had decided to make two new dairy plants in Bhagalpur and Purnia districts operational by the next three-four months each with a capacity of 2 lakh litres per day. The setting of new plants would help enhance the income of the milk producers of the region. In year 2020,Bihar Government started a dairy plant of 5 lakh litres /per day and an animal fodder plant of 300 MT per day at Bhuiyan. For setting up dairy plants and animal fodder plants in the state, the government had released a sum of Rs 53 crores to Comfed as first instalment out of Rs 234 crores. In 2018, Bihar State Milk Co-operative Federation, known as Sudha, planned at consolidating its market in Guwahati before expanding its reach to other states of the Northeast.

== Statistics ==
- Total area-9.36 Million hectares (12th Largest by area)
- Sown area-5.638 Million hectares (Net), 7.946 Million hectares (Gross)
- Total population -130.12 Million (Second largest)
- Wheat-6-6.5 Million MT(6.5% of National production)
- Rice-7.5-8 Million MT(6.5% of National production)
- Maize-4-4.5 Million MT (7% of National production)
- Sugarcane-13.00 million MT(3.71% of National production)
- Pulses-(Arhar, Gram, Urad, Pea, Khesari, Moong, Masoor etc)-400 Thousands MT
- Litchi-0.28 million MT(71% of National production) Largest producer.
- Makhana-0.003 million MT(85% of National production) Largest producer.
- Mango-1.4 million MT(13% of National production) Third largest producer.
- Banana-(6.7% of National production) Seventh largest producer.
- Guava-(10.2% of National production) Third largest producer.
- Pineapple-(2.6% of National production) Fourth largest producer.
- Vegetables-(Potatoes, onions, tomatoes, brinjal, cauliflower etc)-8.60 million MT (9% of National production) Third largest producer.
- Honey-1300 MT (14% of National production)
- Aromatic rice-0.015 million MT.
- Milk production-4.06 million MT. COMFED has established 5023 cooperative societies with 2.54 lakh membership -highest among the eastern states.
- Fishery-0.27 Million MT
