= Ahe Dayamaya Biswa Bihari =

Prayer song by Ramakrushna Nanda

Ahe Dayamaya Biswa Bihari is a prayer song in the Odia language, by the Odia writer Ramakrushna Nanda.

The prayer song was reportedly a favourite of Mahatma Gandhi while he was at Sabarmati Ashram. This prayer poem was included in his Odia textbook Sahitya Sopana, and went on to become the most popular prayer song in Odisha because of its simplicity and beauty.

== Lyrics ==
The full lyrics of this prayer in Odia is as follows:

ଆହେ ଦୟାମୟ ବିଶ୍ୱ ବିହାରୀ, ଘେନ ଦୟା ବହି ମୋର ଗୁହାରି! |୧|

ଜଳ ସ୍ଥଳ ବନ ଗିରି ଆକାଶ, ତୁମ ଲୀଳା ସବୁଠାରେ ପ୍ରକାଶ। |୨|

ତୁମେ ଶୁଭ ବୁଦ୍ଧି ପରା ଶିଖାଅ, ତୁମେ ଭଲ ବାଟ ପରା ଦେଖାଅ |୩|

ମୋର କାମକୁ କରାଅ ସରସ, ମୋର ମୁଖେ ଦିଅ ଚିର ହରଷ |୪|

ତୁମ ଚରଣରେ ମୋର ଭକତି, ଦିଅ ବିପଦେ ସାହସ ଶକତି |୫|

ମୋତେ ଖଳ ଅଳସୁଆ ନିକଟେ, ନିଅ ନାହିଁ ସୁଖେ ଅବା ସଙ୍କଟେ।୬।

ଦୁଃଖୀ ଅରକ୍ଷିତ ସେବା କାରଣେ, ବଳ ଦିଅ ମୋର କର ଚରଣେ |୭|

ସତ କହିବାକୁ କିଆଁ ଡରିବି, ସତ କହି ପଛେ ମଲେ ମରିବି |୮|

ମୋତେ ଏତିକି ଶିଖାଅ ସାଇଁ ହେ, ମୋର ଧନଜନ ଲୋଡ଼ା ନାହିଁ ହେ |୯|
