= Bihar 996 =

Maritime safety education campaign in UAE

Bihar
- Location: Abu Dhabi, United Arab Emirates
- First award: 2009
- Website: http://www.bihar.ae

Bihar 996 is a maritime safety campaign first launched by the Critical National Infrastructure Authority (CNIA) in Abu Dhabi, UAE. The initiative aims at ensuring that residents and visitors of the Emirate of Abu Dhabi are aware of marine safety rules and regulations in Abu Dhabi in order to sustain the growth and improvement of the Emirate while ensuring the safe use and enjoyment of waters in Abu Dhabi.

== The Campaign ==
Bihar (in Arabic. Literally translated to seas) was first launched in 2009 under the slogan "For your Safety" to raise awareness and educate sea goers on the safety rules and regulations of marine sites and protecting critical facilities and maritime reserves. It also aims at raising awareness about permitted fishing and regulations to maintain marine resources. The campaign is mainly aimed at residents and visitors of the Emirate of Abu Dhabi who are using the sea for leisure, fishing or even trade. It is not restricted by age, cultures or social status.

Bihar is a CNIA initiative that ensures people are aware of marine safety rules and regulations in Abu Dhabi in order to sustain the growth and improvement of the Emirate and to make sure people can use and enjoy the waters of Abu Dhabi safely.

The Bihar campaign is raising awareness and educating sea goers about the consequences of violations of rules and stressing the concept of prohibited areas like critical facilities and maritime protected reserves. Bihar also aims to raise awareness about permitted fishing tools and the consequences of depleting marine resources. The campaign targets all sea goers in the Emirate of Abu Dhabi, whether they are using the sea for leisure, fishing or trade. The main goal of this campaign is to reach the largest number of people from different age groups, cultures, and social statuses throughout the Emirate, whether they are locals, expatriates, residents or visitors.

In 2010, the campaign was relaunched with a new slogan, "Better together" to showcase the CNIA's sustained relationship-building approach with the community and all sea goers.

== 996 ==
996 is the designated number for marine emergencies and can be dialed from any location in the United Arab Emirates. The number is operated by the CNIA and handles responses to marine emergencies, accidents or suspicious activity within the waters of Abu Dhabi. Once an emergency called is received, the CNIA will coordinate with other relevant agencies to respond as fast as possible to any marine emergency.

== The CNIA ==
The Critical National Infrastructure Authority (CNIA) is a government established authority tasked with protecting and ensuring the security of Abu Dhabi waters and implementing and enforcing maritime safety rules and regulations. The authority is also responsible for protecting critical facilities from any potential threats.

The authority was established in May 2007 under a Presidential decree issued by His Highness Sheikh Khalifa bin Zayed Al Nahyan, President of the U.A.E and Ruler of Abu Dhabi.

== Campaign Goodwill Ambassador ==
In 2010, Thani Al Qamzi; the international water sport and powerboat champion, was chosen to be the Goodwill Ambassador of the campaign. Thani Al Qamzi races the Formula One Powerboat competitions for Team Abu Dhabi and competes for the UAE in Formula 2000, Wooden Powerboat competitions and Jet Ski races.
