= Duryog Nivaran =

Duryog Nivaran is a South Asian organization that comprises "a network of individuals and organizations who are committed to promoting an alternative perspective on disasters and vulnerability as a basis for disaster mitigation in the region". It was formed in 1994.

It has partnerships with number of organizations from five South Asian countries (Bangladesh, India, Nepal, Pakistan and Sri Lanka) and ADPC. The network embarked on a three-year programme of work supported by ECHO and DFID. Its aim is to "reduce the vulnerability" of communities to disasters and conflicts. It aims to do so by "integrating the alternative perspective" at all the different levels of South Asian disaster mitigation and development programmes; conceptual, policy and implementation.

In 2005, Duryog Nivaran played a role in putting out the South Asia Disaster Report which was rescinded in 2010. In 2006, it drafted a South Asia Policy Document on disaster risk and its effect on people's livelihood which later on formed the basis for the South Asian Policy Dialogue.
