= 2007 Bihar flood =

Flood in India

Meteorological history
- Duration: August 2007

Overall effects
- Fatalities: 1,287
- Areas affected: Bihar, Uttar Pradesh and Nepal

The 2007 Bihar flood occurred in August 2007 in the east Indian state of Bihar. It was described by the United Nations as the worst flood in the living memory of Bihar. Although annual floods are common in Bihar, heavier than usual rainfall during the monsoon season that year led to increasing water levels. By 3 August, the estimated death toll was 41 people, and 48 schoolgirls were marooned in a school in the Darbhanga district. By 8 August, the flooding had impacted an estimated 10 million people in Bihar. Army helicopters delivered food packets to residents, and 180 relief camps were established. By 10 August, aid workers in Bihar reported a dramatic increase in people with diarrhea and by 11 August, flood-related deaths were still occurring. The total number of deaths recorded in the 2007 Bihar floods was more than 1,3050, the highest death toll in the state since the 1987 Bihar floods, in which more than 2,500 deaths were reported.

== Incident ==
The states of Bihar and Uttar Pradesh were the most affected due to their high population density. Nearly two million people, spread over eleven districts in Bihar, were affected by the floods. Many major rivers, including the Ganges, Punpun, Bagmati, Gandak, and Kosi, flowed above the danger mark.

Rainfall in July exceeded the monthly average over a 30-year period by a factor of five, leading to more than 40% of the state of Bihar being submerged. The town of Darbhanga and its surrounding areas were among the most severely affected locations in the state, and roads leading to other areas were rendered impassable by the flood. Many residents were forced to seek refuge on higher ground, while others were marooned and unable to access assistance.

== Affected areas ==
The flood affected 19 districts of the state. Some of the worst affected districts were Muzaffarpur, Sitamarhi, Saharsa, East Champaran, Supaul, Darbhanga, Patna, Bhagalpur, West Champaran, Katihar, Madhubani, Samastipur, Sheohar, Nalanda, Khagaria, Gopalganj, Madhepura, Araria, and Begusarai.

== Impact ==
At least 4,822 villages and 10,000,000 hectares of farm land were affected. About 29,000 houses were destroyed and 44,000 houses were damaged by the floods. Thousands of people were shifted to places of safety, including relief camps.

== Response ==
The United Nations described the flood as the worst to occur in the living memory of Bihar.

== Relief work ==
=== Assistance implemented ===
Grain (38,86,896 Qtls) distributed to affected families was around 50 lakhs. For emergency expenses (Rs 20/- per adult and Rs 15/- per child) that a person is entitled for, GoB had, till August 2008, paid Rs. 84.05 Crores against a demand of Rs. 1105 Crores made to the center. This was just about 8 per cent of the requirement.

== See also ==
- 2004 Bihar flood
- 2008 Bihar flood
- 2008 Indian floods
- Koshi river
- Floods in Bihar
