= Economy of Bihar =

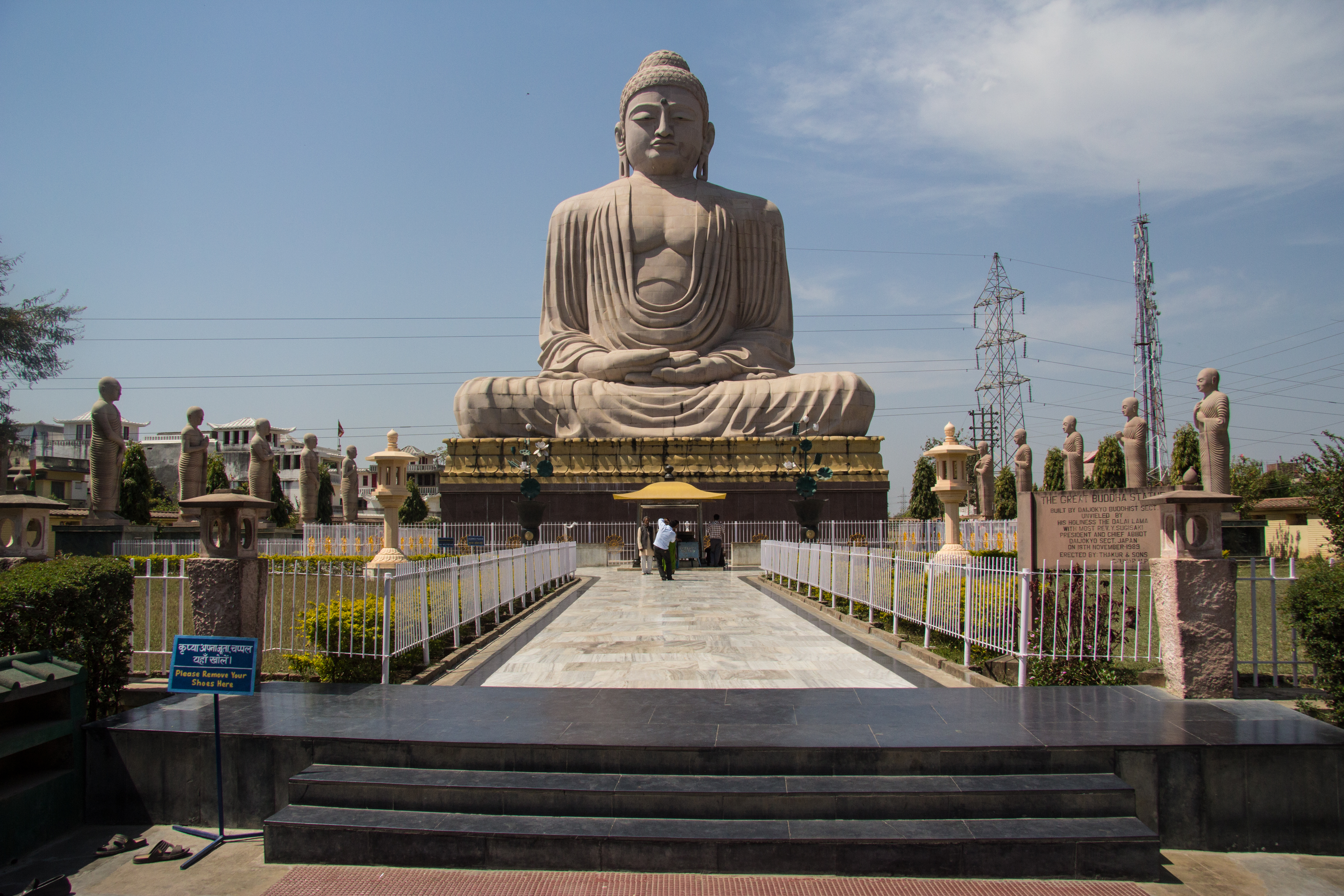
- Great Buddha statue at Bodh Gaya in the Gaya district of Bihar
- Currency: Indian Rupee (INR, ₹)
- Fiscal year: 1 April – 31 March

Statistics
- Population: ▲13,000,0000 (2025)
- GDP: ▲₹13.1 trillion (US$140 billion) (nominal; 2026 est.) ▲₹60.08 trillion (US$640 billion) (PPP; 2026 est.)
- GDP rank: 14th
- GDP growth: 15% (2025-26)
- GDP per capita: ▲₹105,200 (US$1,100) (nominal; 2026-27 est.) ▲₹510,750 (US$5,500)(PPP; 2026-27 est.)
- GDP per capita rank: 35th
- GDP by sector: Agriculture 19.9% Industry 21.5% Services 58.6% (2023–24)
- Inflation (CPI): 4.35% (August 2025)
- Population below national poverty line: ▼15.73% in poverty (2024–25)
- Human Development Index: ▲0.617 medium (2023) (36th)
- Labour force by occupation: Agriculture 54.2% Industry 23.6% Services 22.2% (2015)
- Unemployment: ▼3.9% (Sep 2022)

Public finance
- Government debt: ▼37.04% of GSDP ₹406,476.12 crore (US$43 billion) (2025–26 est.)
- Budget balance: ▲₹32,718.30 crore (US$3.5 billion) 2.98% of GSDP (2025–26 est.)
- Revenue: ▲₹2.61 lakh crore (US$28 billion) (2025–26 est.)
- Spending: ▲₹2.94 lakh crore (US$31 billion) (2025–26 est.)
- Economic aid: ▲7.9% (2017–18)
- All values, unless otherwise stated, are in US dollars.

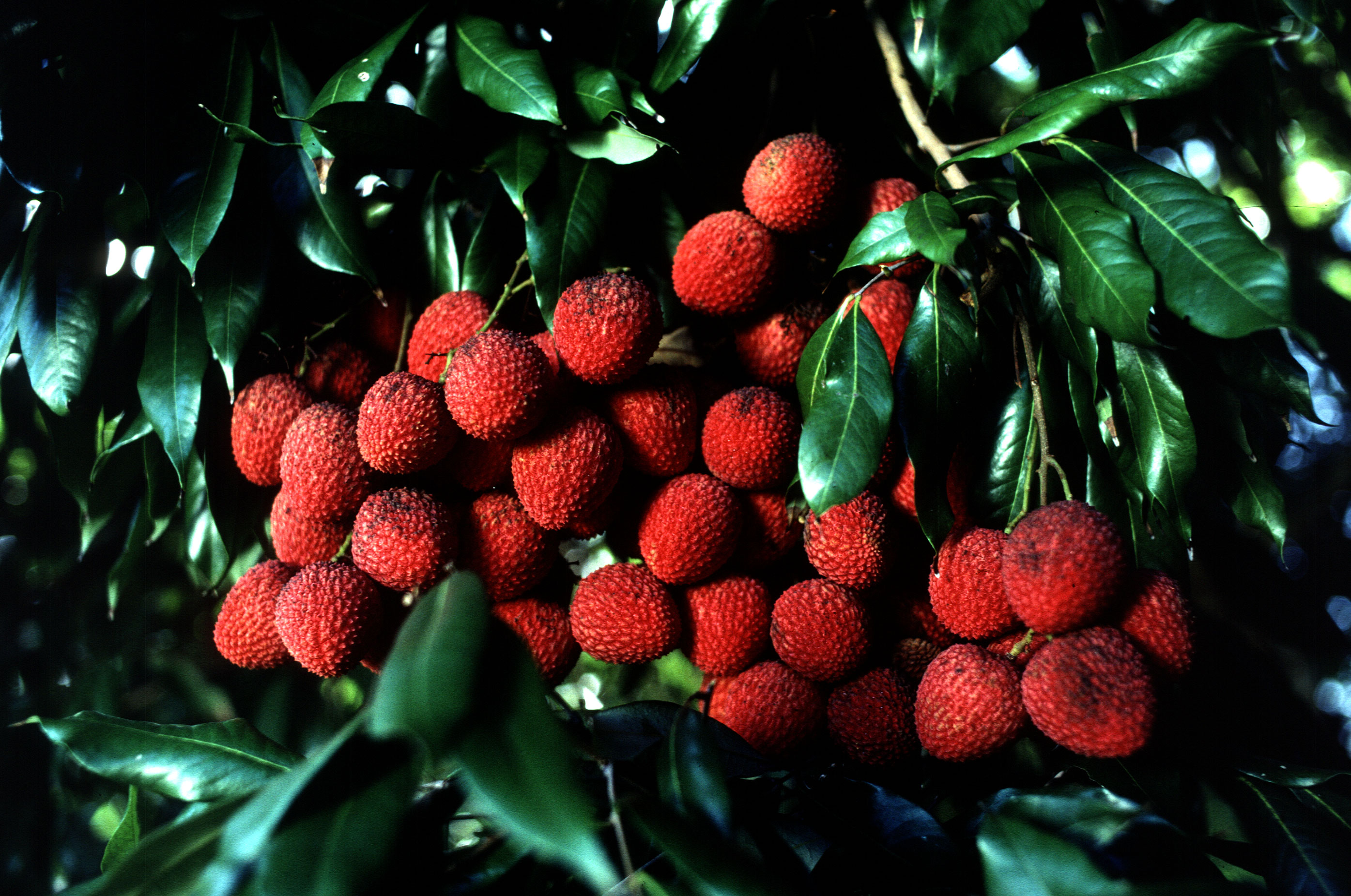
Bihar accounts for 71% of India's annual litchi production.

The economy of Bihar has been among the fastest-growing state economies in India in recent years. During the financial year 2025–26, Bihar's gross state domestic product (GSDP) is projected to grow by around 10–12% at current prices. The economy of Bihar is largely based on services, though agriculture and industry also contribute substantially. At current prices (not adjusted for inflation), the state's GSDP was estimated at ₹1,309,155 crore (US$140 billion) for 2026–27. After forming a new state government in 2025, Nitish Kumar's cabinet has proposed a new initiative called the New Age Economy, which aims to promote economic development in the state.

As of 2021, the service sector accounted for 58.6% of the state's economy, with industry contributing 21.5% and agriculture 19.9%. During 2002–2007, the average growth rate of manufacturing in the state was 0.38%, significantly lower than the national average of 7.8%. In the financial year 2021–22, Bihar's manufacturing sector grew by 3.9%, and it has shown continued improvement in recent years. Bihar has the lowest GDP per capita in India, but there are pockets of higher per capita income, such as the southern half of the state and its capital city, Patna.

The GSDP for 2024–25 is estimated at ₹9,91,997 crore (approximately US$116 billion) at current prices, recording a growth of 13.1%; for 2025–26, the GSDP is projected to be ₹10.97 lakh crore. In actual terms, as of 2025–26, Bihar's state GDP is ranked 11th out of 28 states in India. Corruption is an important challenge for the government to overcome, according to Transparency International India, and the government has acknowledged this situation. Since November 2005, the state government, led by Nitish Kumar, has implemented some economic and social reforms. Such reforms have yielded improvements in the state's and Patna's economies. For example, in June 2009, the World Bank reported that Patna was the second-best city in India in which to start a business, following Delhi.

Between 1999 and 2008, Bihar's GDP grew by 5.1% a year on average, which was below the Indian average of 7.3%. However, in January 2010, the Indian government's Central Statistics Organisation (CSO) reported that in the five years between 2004–05 and 2008–09, Bihar's GDP grew by 11.03% – making Bihar the second-fastest-growing economy in India during those five years, just behind Gujarat's growth of 11.05%. Another survey conducted by the CSO and the National Sample Survey Organisation (under the Ministry of Statistics and Programme Implementation) reported that Bihar showed a 14.80% growth in factory output in 2007–08, which was slightly less than the overall Indian rate of 15.24%.

== History ==
=== Mauryan ===
The economy of the ancient Kingdom of Magadha, under the Mauryan government, depended mainly on agriculture, and the state owned large tracts of farmland for cultivation. The state's other income came from taxes levied on agriculture, land, trade, and products such as handicrafts.

Mauryan agriculture featured two types of landholdings. One type was Rashtra, a direct descendant of the holdings of former tribal oligarchies who had been subjugated in pre-Mauryan times. The Rashtra landholdings were independent of the state machinery in their internal functioning and administration. Their only obligation was regular payment of Rashtra taxes to the state.

The second major type of landholdings was Sita. These holdings were formed by clearing forests with the help of tribespeople whose way of life had been systematically annihilated by Mauryan statecraft. Rice, wheat, coarse grains, sesame, pepper, saffron, pulses, linseed, mustard, vegetables, fruits of various kinds, and sugar cane – all were grown on the cleared land. The state owned large farms, which were cultivated by enslaved people and farm labourers. Water reservoirs and dams were built during this period, and water was measured and distributed.

The chief industries of the time were mining, metallurgy, jewellery, pot making, and textile work. The state often regulated trade. The state especially protected artisans and craftsmen, and any offences against them were severely punished. Guilds were powerful institutions during this period, conferring economic, political, and judicial power on artisans. The chief of a guild was called the Jesthaka. A few guilds issued their own coins. These guilds also made donations to learned Brahmans and to the destitute.

The Mauryan Empire supplied Western countries with indigo and other medicinal substances, as well as cotton and silk. Trade was conducted via both land and sea. Godowns (an Eastern word for warehouses) were built, and special provisions were made to protect trade routes. In addition, the state controlled weights and measures.

=== Sher Shah reforms ===
During the 1540s, Sher Shah Suri – the ruler of Bihar and northern India – introduced a number of measures, including laws to ensure that peasants were not cheated and that all people were treated equally, regardless of religion or class. His empire stretched from the Bengal region in the east to the Indus River in the west. Sher Shah divided his empire into 47 sarkars (provinces or districts), which were further subdivided into parganas for ease of administration. These reforms indicated the economic sophistication of the Bihar region during Sher Shah Suri's rule.

=== Colonial ===
During the colonial period, the rural and urban economies of Bihar underwent gradual changes and faced challenges to their sustainability. The state's villages were always more than just an agriculture-based model, being rather a holistic, integrated system that gave all people a respectable job and sufficient income. These small-scale industries were directly processing agricultural output, helping villages to become self-sufficient; these industries provided products, food, and services to cities as well. The well-known cities of Bihar – such as Magadh (Gaya), Patliputra, Sitamarhi, Purnea, Bhagalpur, Chhapra and Arrah – acted as prime locations for development of the state economy.

With the advent of external traders and successive invasions –along with internal weaknesses – the village economy began to deteriorate. Cheaply available British finished products, such as clothing, caused this deterioration.

=== Post-Independence ===
==== 1947–1979 ====
The sugar and vegetable oil industries were important sectors of undivided Bihar. Until the mid-1950s, a significant share of India's sugar output came from Bihar; in addition, a majority of horticulture products were produced there. Rice and wheat were around 29%, and Bihar was a leading agricultural producer during the period after independence. Dalmianagar was a large agri-industrial town. There were attempts to industrialise the northern half of the state between 1950 and 1980: an oil refinery in Barauni, the Barauni Fertiliser Plant, the Barauni Thermal Power Station, a motor scooter plant at Fatuha, a power plant at Muzaffarpur, and the manufacturer Bharat Wagon and Engineering at Muzaffarpur and Mokama. There were multiple factors behind Bihar's economic decline. Many people in Bihar blame the freight equalisation scheme, poor political vision, and under-investments in the key sectors of agriculture, infrastructure, and education. Others view cultural and political factors as the reasons behind economic decline, especially during the 1980s and 1990s.

Between 1947 and 2000, the government supported industrialisation in the southern half of the state, rather than in the northern half. That government is often blamed for a lack of industrialisation in northern Bihar. The undivided Bihar government developed important industrial cities such as Bokaro, Jamshedpur, Dhanbad and Ranchi in the south. The north remained the agricultural heart of the undivided state. Thus the two regions complemented each other.

==== 1980–1989 ====
Indian government data from 1980 to 1990 show that the GSDP of undivided Bihar grew by 72% during this period, despite the state's socio-economic problems. The data also show that the state's GSDP grew by 49% between 1980 and 1985, indicating that the state's economy was among the fastest-growing in the country during the early 1980s. In 1980, undivided Bihar had a population of 70 million. During the 1980s, the national five-year plan called for $4 billion in investment in Bihar. By 1987, this amount translated into a $12 investment per person. Economists claimed that a huge budget deficit was spurring inflation, thereby eroding the standard of living of the poorest sections of Bihar's population. In agriculture, the largest sector, the government failed to invest in production and instead opted to import food grains from other parts of India. This decision helped to facilitate problems faced by agricultural workers during the late 1980s and paved the way for the victory of the politician Lalu Prasad Yadav in 1989.

Manufacturing of food products in Bihar
	1991–1992					1993–1994				
	FVPI	Dairy products	Grain milling	Bakery	Veg. oils	FVPI	Dairy products	Grain milling	Bakery	Veg. oils
No. of factories	3	11	159	31	36	5	19	176	33	31
Value of output (₹100,000)	31	2905	12667	2187	1315	365	6798	210119	981	767
Net value (₹100,000)	−15	151	1070	408	71	29	1231	1162	177	257
Net income (₹100,000)	−75	106	683	290	49	−19	1069	713	137	237
NI/NVA		70	64	71	69		87	62	77	53

Growth of factory units in Bihar and India, 1997–98
Year	Bihar (Units)	India (Units)	Bihar's Share (%)
1991–92	1371	112,286	3.26
1992–93	3885	19,494	3.25
1993–94	N.A.	N.A.	N.A.
1994–95	3600	121,010	2.92
1995–96	3617	134,571	2.68
1996–97	3317	134,556	2.50
1997–98	3297	135,551	2.43

==== 1990–2005 ====
===== Caste and criminalisation =====
The Rashtriya Janata Dal (RJD) – Lalu Prasad Yadav's party – supported social justice, ensuring that politics was dominated by Mandal Commission politics and caste rather than development during this period. Moreover, the criminalisation of politics around this time created a business-unfriendly climate and contributed to economic collapse. The most important crisis that business faced was organised kidnapping, which was linked to the ruling RJD party. The resulting crisis led to a flight of capital, middle-class professionals, and business leaders to other parts of India. Unemployment was increased by the flight of business and capital, leading to the mass migration of Bihari farmers and unemployed youth to more developed states in India.

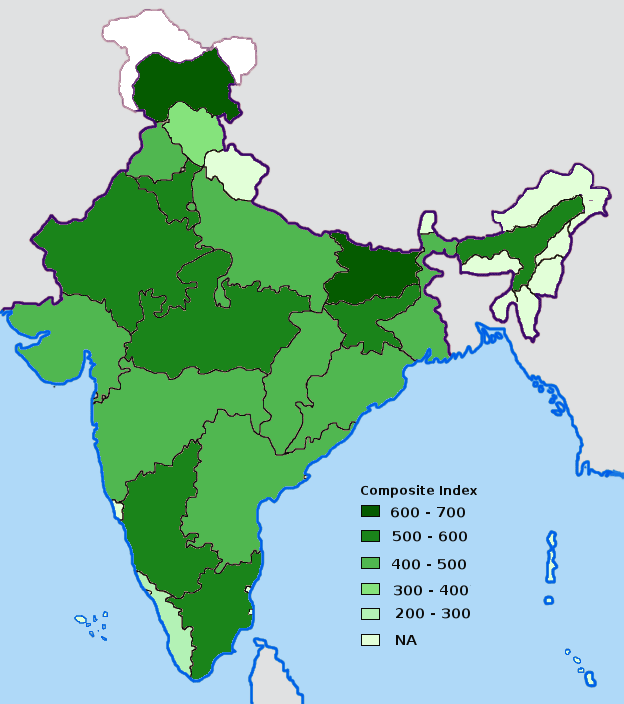
Extent of corruption in Indian states, as measured in a 2005 study by Transparency International India. (Darker regions are more corrupt)

===== Structural and fiscal factors =====
Bihar's share of revenue from the central pool declined by ₹5,000 crore as the centre's revenue collection fell. This decline – coupled with the government's failure to have its plan allocation released, because it could not contribute the required matching non-plan grant – aggravated the state's financial crisis. The division of Bihar in 2000 – when the industrially advanced and mineral-rich southern half of the state was separated to form the state of Jharkhand – had a strong impact on development in the north, mainly through a loss of revenue. The divided Bihar produces 60% of the output of the undivided Bihar.

===== Economic indicators under the RJD =====
In non-agricultural sectors, Bihar's growth rate was 6.62%, compared with 6.61% for India as a whole during the 1980s. During the 1990s, the growth rate in Bihar was 3.19%, while for India it rose to 7.25%. This change was reflected in per capita income as well. Per capita income in Bihar grew by 2.45% during the 1980s, compared with 3.32% in India as a whole. In the 1990s, per capita income grew by 0.12% in Bihar, as against 4.08% in India. The growth rate in agriculture was 2.21% during the 1980s, against India's 3.38%. During the 1990s, it was 2.35% in Bihar, while at the national level it stood at 3.14%. The economic indicators show that a serious recession occurred between 1990 and 1995; this resulted in a crisis with employment, development and crime between 1995 and 2004.

== Current ==
=== Leadership of Nitish Kumar ===
After the politician Nitish Kumar came to power in Bihar, he prioritised creating investment opportunities for large industrial firms such as Reliance Industries. Improvements in law and order, along with a more proactive bureaucracy, led to a gradual improvement in the state's economy. NDTV dubbed this "the quiet transformation". In January 2009, Nitish Kumar was awarded the CNN-IBN Indian Politician of the Year award for helping to put Bihar on the track to sustainable development and growth. Again in January 2009, the Associated Chambers of Commerce and Industry of India (ASSOCHAM) Investment Meter stated that the private sector invested over ₹304 crore in Bihar during the third quarter of 2008.

=== Policies ===
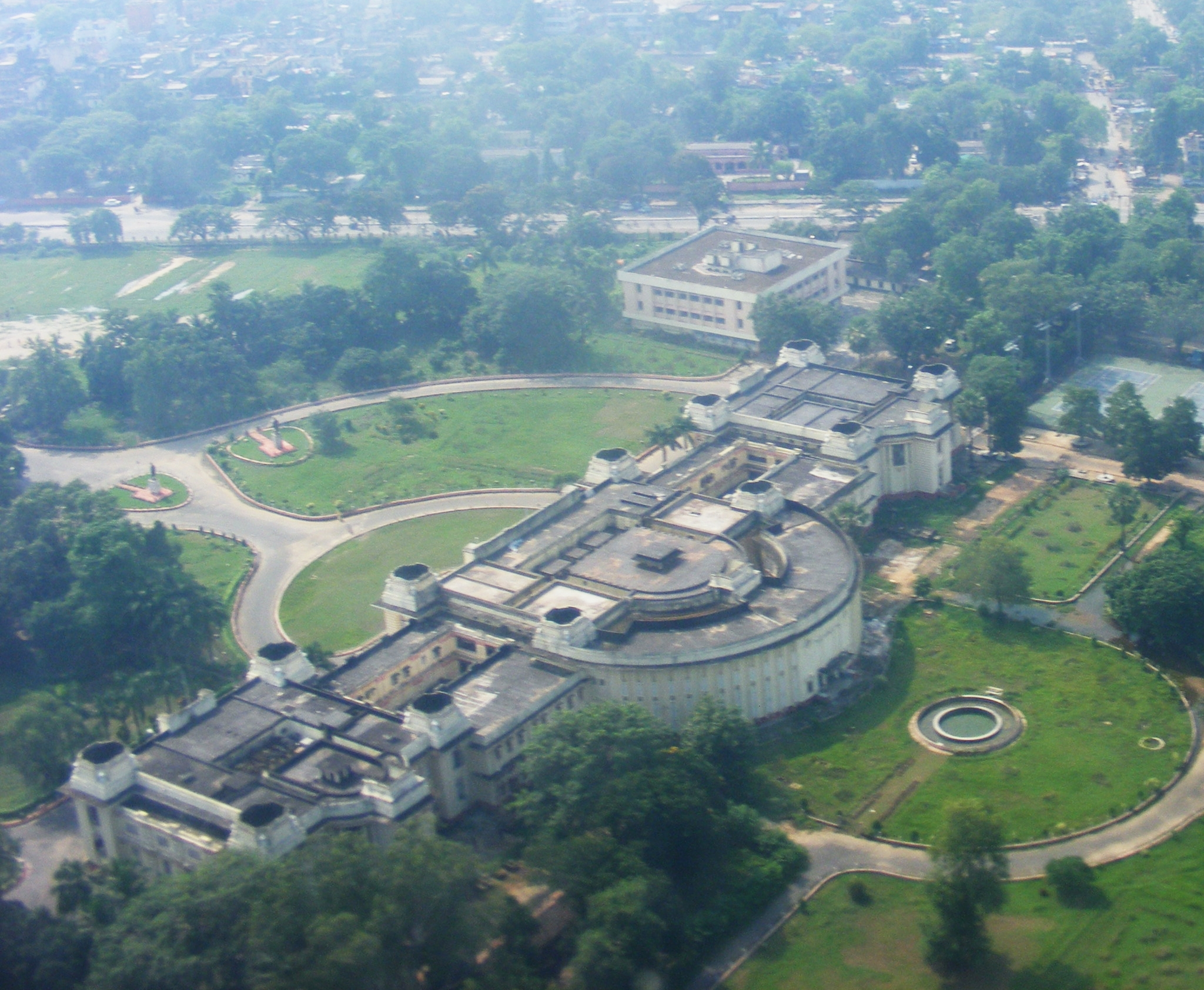
Secretariat Building, Patna

After November 2005, the Government of Bihar introduced several laws, which it hoped would provide a positive contribution to the future development of the state's industries.

==== 2006 ====
- Bihar Single Window Clearance Act
- Bihar Infrastructure Development Enabling Act
- New industrial policy
- Price preference policy
- New policy initiatives for the entertainment, tea processing and sugar sectors
- Policy for establishing institutions of higher technical education in the private sector
- Simplification of value-added tax (VAT)

==== 2007 ====
- VAT reimbursement at 80% of the deposited amount for a period of 10 years, with a ceiling of 300% of the capital investment; provisions for incentives, even in zero-VAT cases.
- Reimbursement of 50% of the amount spent on plant and machinery for captive power generation.
- 25% of the VAT reimbursement for existing units.
- Exemption from electricity duty for new units; exemption from Stamp Duty and registration fee on land transfer.
- Incentive granted on land/shed in industrial Area/ Industrial Park, etc.
- Corpus fund creation for sick and closed units.
- Exemption from annual minimum guarantee / monthly minimum guarantee. Central Sales Tax (CST) was reduced to only 1% for small and medium industries.
- Bihar was the first state to have its ethanol policy led by Minister of Industries Shahnawaz Hussain Sayed in 2020, bringing investment in the amount of 35,000 crore in the ethanol sector.
- Bihar's textile policy is under formulation, as announced by Minister of Industries Shahnawaz Hussain Sayed.

==== 2015 ====
In 2015, the Bihar government, led by Chief Minister Nitish Kumar, created the Saat Nischay Yojana scheme. This scheme establishes goals needed for Bihar's development. Under the scheme, there are seven resolutions. The Saat Nischay Yojana was launched in two parts:

- Saat Nischay Yojana Part 1
- Saat Nischay Yojana Part 2. Part 2 was released five years after Part 1. Seven new resolutions were conceived in Part 2 of the scheme.

=== Improvements and investments ===
==== Roads construction and investment ====
The government is working on an expressway from the Purvanchal border through Bihar to Jharkhand; the government has also expanded the highway from Hajipur to Muzaffarpur from two to four lanes. The northeast corridor expressway, funded by the central government, will run through the northern part of Bihar. The state now spends ₹2,222.08 crore on roads (2007–08), compared with ₹51.2 crore between 2003 and 2004.

In September 2008, a US$420 million loan from the Asian Development Bank (ADB) was provided to the government to improve nine state highways. The loan would be used to convert nine state highways into double-lane roads, covering a stretch of 820 kilometres (510 mi). The government aims to convert these roads into double-lane traffic corridors in accordance with international standards, and it has invited bids for their conversion under international bidding procedures. The ADB had also given consent for the development of a 1,500-kilometre (930 mi) stretch of state highways into two-lane roads per international standards under the Bihar State Highways Project (BSHP). BSHP will be executed in two phases. The nine state highways have been included in the first phase.

World Bank India director Onno Ruhl has said that the Bank would double its assistance to Bihar from the current $500 million during the next two years or so. Recently, Bihar announced that it will develop its first four-lane expressway from Amas, Gaya, to the Darbhanga airport. The second major expressway will be from Raxaul to Kolkata via Patna. The third expressway is set to be six lanes wide, stretching from Buxar to Bhagalpur. Expressways will be connected with the existing Purvanchal expressways. Another proposed expressway is from Gorakhpur to Darjeeling, a major portion of which will pass through northern Bihar. Patna Ring Road, which will be four to six lanes wide, is also planned in Bihar. Many more important national highways have been converted into four-lane highways or are currently under construction. Notable examples of these include the following:

Highways
From	To	No. of lanes
Patna	Gaya	4
Buxar	Patna	4
Sasaram	Arrah	4
Gaya	Rajgir	4
Patna	Bihar Sharif	4
Mokama	Bhagalpur	4
Begusarai	Muzaffarpur	2
Chapra	Hajipur	4

Many major bridges over the Ganges River are under construction. After completion of these bridges, Bihar will have 36 north-to-south lanes of connectivity. (A full list of Bihar's bridges is available separately.)

==== Mobile phone growth ====
In addition, Bihar has the largest growing mobile phone market in India. Bihar recorded the largest increase in annual telecom subscribers, with growth of 88.2% in the financial year 2007–08, compared with 51.1% in 2006–07. The total number of mobile phones in Bihar increased from 5,773,370 in 2006–07 to 10,869,459 in 2007–08.

Jobs

In the economic report of the caste census, numbers of people and their percentages are provided by dividing jobs into three categories. A total of 4.92% of the population is employed, of whom 1.57% are in government jobs. 2.14% of the total population holds private jobs in the unorganised sector. Private jobs in the organised sector, with benefits such as Employees' Provident Fund (EPF) insurance, are held by 1.22% of the population.

==== Industrial development and power sector ====
For industrial development, Bihar's National Democratic Alliance (NDA) government has cleared a total of 135 proposals worth ₹71,289.64 crore, submitted by major entrepreneurs to set up medium-sized and large industries. These proposals are related to the state's sugar mills, ethanol, engineering and medical colleges, and power production. A sum of ₹602.54 crore had been spent on activities related to the cleared projects, which are likely to create job opportunities for more than 114,000 people. The proposals include opening 23 new sugar mills and expanding seven existing ones, as well as ethanol production in two sugar mills and five plants for processing sugar cane juice. Several other projects – involving five power plants, 12 food-processing units, and 15 steel-processing and cement plants – have also been cleared by the state.

Older industrial projects are also undergoing expansion and modernisation. For example, expansion is underway for the oil refinery at Barauni, increasing production from the present 6 million metric tonnes (MMT) annually to 9 MMT annually. A Polymer Park is also under construction at the Barauni refinery. In addition, the closed Hindustan Fertiliser Corporation (HFC) factory at Barauni is being reopened, with an investment of thousands of crores, and it is expected to produce urea by 2024. The Pepsi Company has invested ₹500 crore to establish a bottling plant in Barauni.

In addition, power generation in Bihar has surged, reaching 7700 MW in 2021. The following major power projects in Bihar are undergoing construction and expansion:

- NTPC Barh – 660*5 MW
- NTPC Nabinagar – 3300 MW
- NTPC Barauni – 470 MW
- NTPC – Railway Aurangabad – 660*3 MW
- NTPC Buxar – 1400 MW

The expansion of flight connectivity to Mumbai, Bangalore, and other Indian cities from Gaya airport has been scheduled and is under way. The goal is to boost investment in the construction of a new airport at Darbhanga in Bihar – under the UDAN scheme of the central government – making it the most successful airport under this scheme, as well as connecting to all major cities of India. (These cities include Delhi, Mumbai, Bangalore, Kolkata, Pune, Ahmedabad and Jaipur, among others.) The land acquisition process for Purnea Airport in Bihar's most backward region is underway. A civil enclave with an annual capacity of 2.5 million passengers is under construction at Bihta in Patna District to ease the burden on Patna's airport. The terminal for this airport is under construction, expanding to accommodate 8 million passengers annually. Patna's airport is the 14th-busiest airport in India.

==== Tax collection improvements ====
Tax collection by the state government has improved. Growth of tax collection in the first half stood at 265%. Patna witnessed a 43.09% growth in personal income tax collection, reaching ₹559 crore.

Impact of the Mahatma Gandhi National Rural Employment Guarantee Act

The implementation of the Mahatma Gandhi National Rural Employment Guarantee Act (MGNREGA) has also led to a dramatic fall in the number of migrant workers in India's Punjab state.

=== State GDP from 2004 to 2007 ===
Under President's Rule (February-November 2005) and the current NDA government (November 2005 to date), the state's GSDP has grown at an average rate of 12% per year. Moreover, from 2004 to 2007, the state's GSDP had grown by 22%. The growth rate has led Indian business leaders to visit Patna, with commitments to invest in the state's fast-growing economy.

=== Credit crisis in 2008–09 ===
Despite the global credit crisis, auto sales and the real-estate sector continued to grow in Bihar. Auto sales grew by 45% to 1,33,000 during the last 11 months of 2008, against 92,147 sold in 2007. Because of the global credit crunch, many Indian states have reported a decline of 20–25% in automobile sales. Bihar's Deputy Chief Minister Sushil Kumar Modi said, "The rise in sales figures of vehicles in the state at the rate of 45% shows that the recession has not affected the sector at all in the state." November 2008 showed 19,729 vehicle sales across categories, compared with 15,326 in the same period of the previous year. The revenue collection department in Bihar has recorded a 28.02% increase in revenue collection through November 2008. The department collected ₹192.01 crore in 2008, up from ₹149.99 crore in 2007.

In addition, the real-estate sector earned ₹37 crore in revenue from flat registrations during October and November 2008. Altogether, 3,139 flats were registered, which indicates good cash flow. The global recession has hit the real-estate sector hard in other parts of India, prompting builders to slash rates and offer attractive packages to boost sales. Key factors in Bihar avoiding the recession include the following: the small industrial base, brought on by political mismanagement in the 1990s; the small-scale nature of the loans sector; and employment being generally with the public sector or businesses that are partly government-owned. The service sector, the other major employer, is less mature than in other Indian states, and it serves a large market. Sushil Kumar Modi added that real-estate prices had risen tremendously since the middle-class population came to dominate the state. Another factor was the large number of development projects that had been launched in Bihar since the NDA government came to power in 2005, attracting many construction companies, builders, and suppliers. In 2008 alone, the state government invested ₹13,500 crore in development projects.

=== Post-COVID era: The beginning of industries ===
When the COVID-19 pandemic spread across India, it led to lockdowns and industry shutdowns in places such as Maharashtra, Karnataka and West Bengal, where most people from Bihar work. After the pandemic spread, several industries closed down. These shutdowns caused workers to return to their home state. Such returns were a turning point in Bihar: skilled workers started their own manufacturing businesses, beginning in the Champaran region and later in many other parts of the state.

=== Kosi floods ===
During the floods in Bihar in 2008, standing crops worth ₹800 crore were destroyed in the five northern districts of Saharsa, Supaul, Madhepura, Araria and Purnia. Three lakh hectares of cropland were submerged under floodwater. Up to 3,500 people have been reported as missing

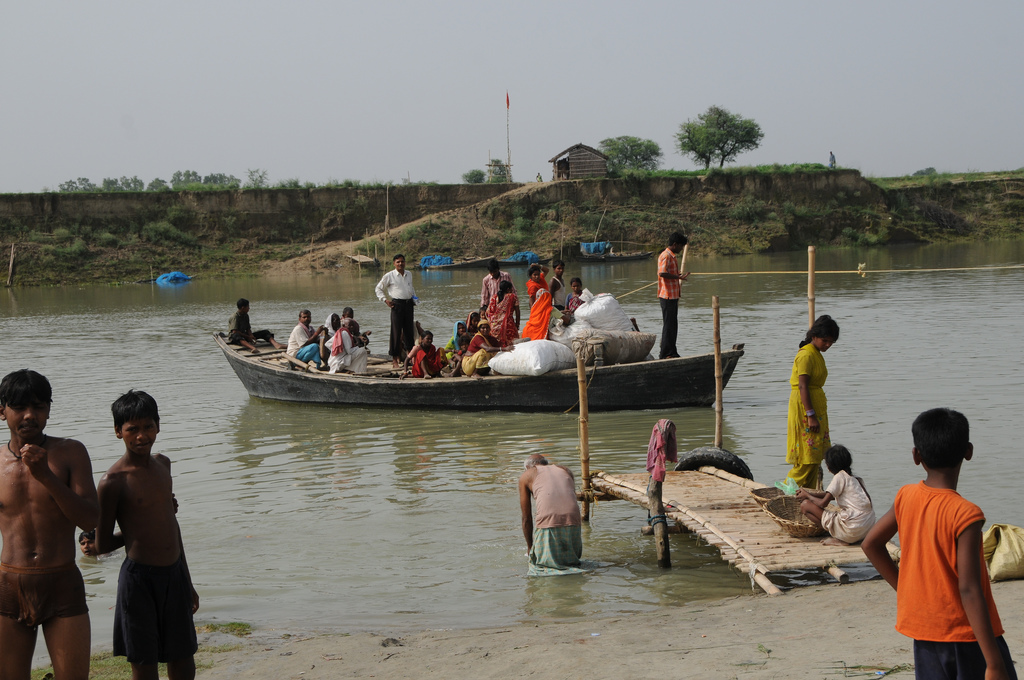
2008 Bihar floods.

=== Public-private partnership ===
Indian Railways Contract

Indian Railways announced contracts to manufacture electric locomotives in Bihar. The electric locomotives would be manufactured at a factory in Madhepura and the diesel ones at Marora. Five multinational companies were shortlisted for two separate contracts, jointly worth an estimated ₹37,600 crore ($8 billion), to manufacture and supply locomotives for Indian Railways. In the past, Indian Railways manufactured locomotives at the Chittaranjan Locomotive Works in West Bengal or at state-owned Bharat Heavy Electricals Ltd, and diesel locomotives at the Diesel Locomotive Works in Varanasi. These factories developed capacity issues. Three companies – Germany's Siemens AG, Bombardier Transportation India Ltd (a unit of Canada's Bombardier Inc.), and France's Alstom SA – were attempting to secure an order to build and supply at least 660 electric locomotives for the railways. General Electric Co. (GE) and Electro-Motive Diesel Inc. (EMD) would compete for the second contract to build and supply 1,000 diesel locomotives for the national transporter.

== Economic indicators ==
=== GSDP at current prices, 2000–07 ===
From the India Brand Equity Foundation (February 2020 data, not including Jharkhand)

Year	GSDP (₹ crore)	Percentage change
1999–00	₹50,200	▲12.7%
2000–01	₹57,279	▲14.10%
2001–02	₹57,804	▲0.92%
2002–03	₹65,117	▲12.65%
2003–04	₹66,961	▲2.83%
2004–05	₹73,791	▲10.20%
2005–06	₹79,682	▲7.98%
2006–07	₹94,251	▲18.28%
2007–08	₹1,13,680	▲15.24%
2008–09	₹1,42,504	▲11.31%
2009–10	₹1,63,555	▲17.6%
2010–11	₹2,03,555	▲10.5%
2011–12	₹2,47,144	▲15.04%
2012–13	₹2,82,368	▲14.17%
2013–14	₹3,17,101	▲12.41%
2014–15	₹3,42,951	▲8.2%
2015–16	₹3,71,602	▲7.58%
2016–17	₹4,21,051	▲15.45%
2017–18	₹4,68,746	▲14.6%
2018–19	₹5,27,976	▲5.70%
2019–20	₹5,81,855	▲11.05%
2020–21	₹5,67,814	▼7.40%
2021–22	₹6,47,394	▲14.01%
2022–23	₹7,46,417	▲15.29%
2023–24	₹8,54,429	▲14.47%
2024–25	₹9,76,514	▲13.5%
2025–26	₹10,97,644	▲12.33%

=== Net state domestic product (NSDP) at factor cost at current prices ===
From the Reserve Bank of India's Handbook of Statistics on Indian Economy 2011–12

Year	NSDP (₹ crore)	Percentage change
Base Year: 1999–2000
1999–2000	₹46,071	▲
2000–01	₹52,519	▲14.0%
2001–02	₹52,323	▼0.4%
2002–03	₹59,302	▲13.3%
2003–04	₹59,701	▲0.7%
2004–05	₹66,041	▲10.6%
Base Year: 2004–05
2005–06	₹75,311	▲14.0%
2006–07	₹94,111	▲25.0%
2007–08	₹1,08,096	▲14.9%
2008–09	₹1,39,061	▲28.6%
2009–10	₹1,63,555	▲17.6%
2010–11	₹2,01,264	▲23.1%
Base Year: 2011–12
2011–12	₹2,47,144	▲20.8%
2012–13	₹2,56,851	▲3.93%
2013–14	₹2,69,650	▲4.98%
2014–15	₹2,79,482	▲3.65%
2015–16	₹2,96,488	▲6.08%
2016–17	₹3,18,797	▲7.52%
2017–18	₹3,44,028	▲7.91%
2018–19	₹3,81,383	▲10.86%
2019–20	₹3,98,329	▲4.44%
2020–21	₹3,68,970	▼7.37%
2021–22	₹3,87,256	▲4.96%
2022–23	₹4,25,384	▲9.85%
2023–24	₹4,64,540	▲9.20%

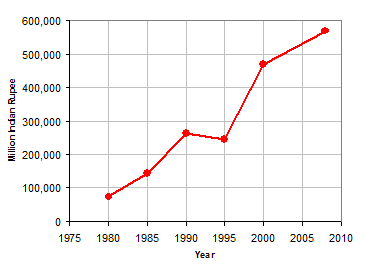
Macro-economic trend of Bihar's gross state domestic product (GSDP) at market prices, by the Ministry of Statistics and Programme Implementation

=== Income distribution – north-south divide ===
With respect to gross district domestic product (GDDP), Bihar's districts of Patna, Magadh and Begusarai were the top three among the 38 districts in the state; these districts had per capita GDDPs of ₹31,441, ₹10,087 and ₹9,312, respectively in 2004–05. The North Bihar districts are severely affected by floods each year, resulting in a loss of human capital and livelihood for thousands of people.

During the financial year 2021–22, the top three districts with respect to income were Patna, Begusarai and Munger; these districts had per capita incomes of ₹1,31,100, ₹51,400 and ₹44,300, respectively. The state average was ₹50,555.

=== Poverty, income, and urbanisation ===
The state has a per capita income of $610 a year against India's average of $2,200; 30.6% of the state's population lives below the poverty line against India's average of 22.15%. However, Bihar's GSDP grew by 18% over the period 2006–2007, a higher growth rate than during the previous 10 years.

Barauni (in the Begusarai district) and Hajipur remain major industrial towns in the state, linked to the capital city through the Ganges bridge and good road infrastructure. The level of urbanisation (10.5%) is below the national average (27.78%). Urban poverty in Bihar (32.91%) is above the national average (23.62%). Moreover, using per capita water supply as a surrogate variable, Bihar (61 litres per day) is below the national average (142 litres per day).

In terms of urbanisation, the number of towns in Bihar has increased as follows: there were 130 towns in 2001, 199 in 2011, and 207 in 2017. There are a total of 38 urbanised districts, and the state is 11.3% urbanised overall; by comparison, India is 31.2% urbanised overall.

There are 45,103 villages in Bihar, having 853 police stations and 43 police districts.

The state's capital city, Patna – along with the districts of Gaya and East Champaran district – remained among the most prosperous districts (i.e., in the top three). By contrast, the districts of Sheohar, Sheikhpura district and Arwal remained the least prosperous (i.e., in the bottom three). During the financial year 2019–20, Patna had the highest per capita income in Bihar, followed by the Begusarai and Munger districts.

== Economy of Patna ==
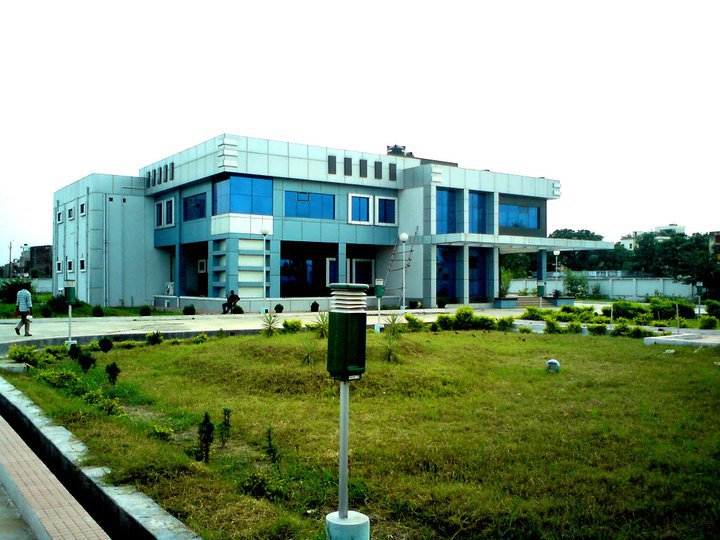
Software Technology Park of India, Patna

Patliputra was the largest city and headquarters of Patna district, Patna division, and Bihar state. It lies on the main line of the Eastern Central Railway and is well connected by road. According to estimates, the city has a population of 1.8 million people, and the district has a population of 5.6 million.

Patna district alone contributes more than 27% of the state's $120 billion GDP. The GDP of Patna is around $30 billion.

=== Patna in the 17th century ===
During the 17th century, Patna – then part of the Mughal Empire – was a flourishing centre of international trade. It emerged as one of the most significant urban and commercial hubs in eastern India. Strategically located on the banks of the Ganges River, Patna became a major link in the vast trade network connecting the Indian subcontinent with Central Asia, Southeast Asia and Europe.

In 1620, the British East India Company established a factory (trading post) in Patna primarily for the purchase and storage of calico (a variety of cotton textile) and fine silk; these two commodities were in high demand in Europe. As trading opportunities expanded, saltpetre – potassium nitrate, essential for making gunpowder – soon became one of the most coveted products exported from Patna. This valuable commodity played a critical role in global geopolitics and warfare during the period, drawing the attention of European powers.

Recognising Patna's immense economic potential, other European countries quickly followed the British. The French, Dutch, Danes and Portuguese all set up their own factories, warehouses (called godowns) and trading agencies in the city; this led to intense competition among countries. The bustling trade transformed Patna into a cosmopolitan centre, with diverse languages, cultures and commercial practices interacting daily.

European travellers and chroniclers of the time included Peter Mundy, a British merchant and explorer, who visited Patna in 1632; he described it as "the greatest mart of the eastern region". His observations underline the city's importance not only as a local trade centre, but also as a vital node in the global commercial network. Goods from Tibet, Nepal, Bengal, Gujarat and even the Coromandel Coast passed through Patna, on their way to either inland destinations or overseas markets.

Apart from textiles and saltpetre, Patna also traded in spices, opium, indigo, sugar, grain and ivory; this made it one of the wealthiest cities in the region. The city also hosted a thriving artisan community that produced fine crafts and traditional goods, catering to both domestic and international markets.

Under Mughal rule, particularly during the reigns of Emperor Jahangir and Shah Jahan, Patna enjoyed a relatively stable political environment that fostered trade. Local nawabs and zamindars cooperated with foreign merchants, sometimes offering protection and favourable terms in exchange for taxes or gifts.

By the late 17th century, Patna had firmly established itself as a vibrant centre of global commerce, attracting merchants, adventurers, and diplomats from across Asia and Europe. Its flourishing economy and strategic importance made it a prized possession in the eyes of colonial powers, foreshadowing the increasing European involvement in the region in later centuries.

=== Manufacturing, export, import ===
Patna is known for manufacturing pulses, shoes, scooters, masur (red lentil), chasra, electrical goods and cotton yarn. The city exports these manufactured products as well as vegetables, purval (pointed gourd) and milk. Patna is a major importer of cotton, iron, foodgrains, rice, wheat, wool and dalhan. Rice accounts for more than one third of the gross area sown. Other important food grains are maize, pulses, and wheat. Non-food crops consist mostly of oilseeds, and cash crops such as vegetables and watermelons are also grown in the Diara belt.

=== Canals ===
Patna is one of the few districts in the state with a network of irrigation canals. Attention has been paid to providing irrigation facilities. Besides the various irrigation projects executed in the districts, tube wells were also installed under schemes of the Patna-Barh-Ekangasarai-Bihta Emergency River Pump and Technical Co-operation Administration.

=== Fishing ===
The city offers one of the best fishing grounds in India. The spawn of rehu, cattla and hilsa is collected from the Ganges River; this spawn is in demand in other parts of Bihar and West Bengal. The fishing season begins in October, with the peak months in December, January and February, when a variety of fish are available at the fish market. There are many rivers and streams, ponds and low-lying fields in the district where water accumulates during the rainy season, and these have considerable potential for fisheries development. The fisheries development schemes of the district are managed by the district fisheries office located in Patna, under the administrative control of the Director of Fisheries in the Government of Bihar.

=== Per capita income ===
Bihar has the lowest per capita income in the country at ₹50,745, compared with the national average of ₹1,35,000 in 2020. Patna recorded a per capita income of ₹1,12,280 in 2017–18. The per capita income of Begusarai district was ₹45,540, and that of Munger was ₹37,000; these were Bihar's second- and third-place districts in per capita income.

Average per capita income, 2019
City	trend	Per capita income
Patna		₹2.02L
Bengaluru		₹6.21L
Kolkata		₹2.04L
Hyderabad		₹6.58L
Greater Mumbai		₹6.43L
Gurugram		₹7.41L
Noida		₹6.13L
All India		₹1.72L
Average Per Capita Income in various Indian Cities

Per capita income in Bihar

=== Development ===
The NDA government has secured financing and support for major projects to improve the city's entertainment sector. It was expected that in 2009, new multiplexes, malls, parks, and restaurants would all open in the city. China and the United States are currently engaged in business operations in Patna. The government is investing ₹300 crore on two projects: one to replicate the Dilli Haat in Patna, and the other to create a Buddha Park.

=== World Bank report ===
In June 2009, the World Bank ranked Patna as the best city in India for starting a business (out of 17 cities). The World Bank also ranked Patna second for contract enforcement, ninth for dealing with construction permits, 15th for paying taxes and registering property, 10th for trading across borders, and 15th for closing a business. Overall, the city was ranked 14th.

=== Civic amenities ===
Basic civic amenities in the city have improved as of 2025. Garbage is being dumped in dedicated dumping grounds across the city. With respect to drinking water, almost 95% of the total estimated five lakh households have a legal water connection. The city pumps reduce its water wastage from 110 to 20 million litres of untreated sewage into the Ganges River. The poor condition of the sewage system – which in some areas has been improved – is far from the pipeline for drinking water, thereby improving the quality of drinking water.

The Patna Metro system is under construction, with almost 80% of the work completed; 60% of the investment comes from the Japan International Cooperation Agency (JICA), and the remaining 20% comes from the state and the central government, respectively. The total cost of the project is ₹13,500 crore and is expected to start by 2024. An electric bus is another civic amenity introduced in the city. A chain of scores of flyovers has been constructed in Patna, and many more are under construction.

In addition, the Loknayak Ganga Path expressway (also known as Marine Drive), 21 km long, has been completed in Patna; the first and second phases have been completed from Digha to Deedearganj. The AIIMS-Digha elevated corridor and the Atal Path expressway are major roadways in Patna for smooth traffic flow.

Meanwhile, the Greater Patna and Patna Smart City projects are in the implementation stage.

== Agriculture ==
Bihar produces significant amounts of mango, guava, litchi, pineapple, brinjal (eggplant), cauliflower, bhindi (okra), and cabbage. Despite the state's leading role in food production, investment in irrigation and other agriculture facilities has been inadequate.

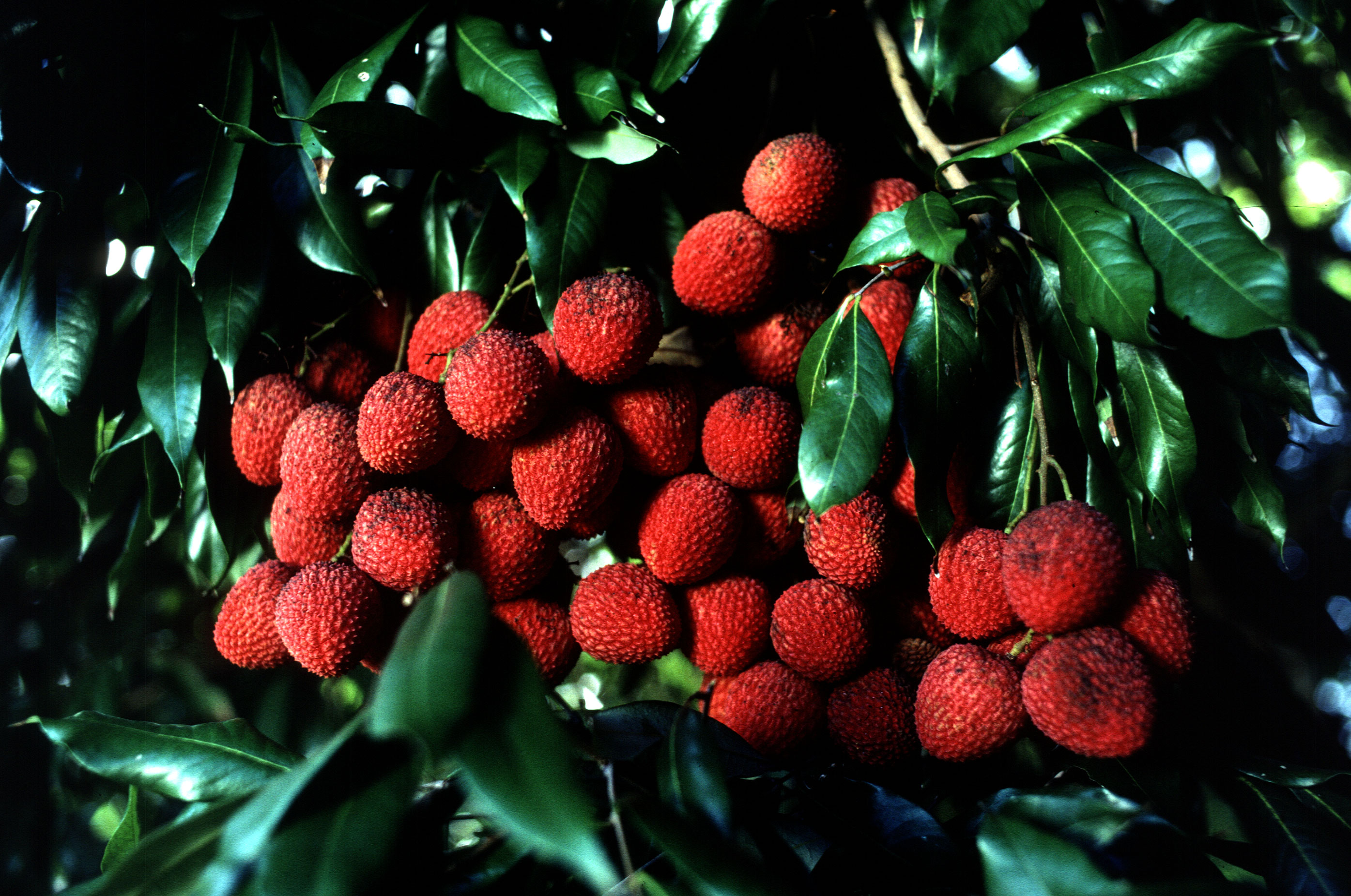
Bihar accounts for 71 per cent of India's annual litchi production

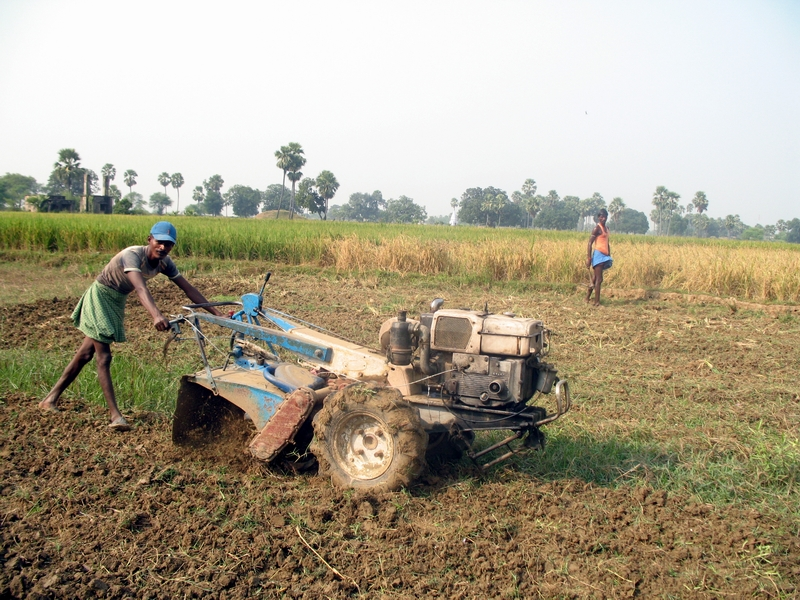
Farm workers in Bihar

- Maize accounts for 1.5 MMT (or 10% of national production).
- Sugar cane production is 13.00 MMT.
- Litchi production is 0.28 MMT (Bihar contributes 71% of national production).
- Makhana levels are 0.003 MMT (Bihar contributes 85% of national production).
- Mango production is 1.4 MMT (13% of all India).
- Vegetable production is 8.60 MMT (9% of all India).
- Honey production is 1300 MT (14% of all India).
- Aromatic rice production is 0.015 MMT.
- Milk production (present): 4.06 MMT. COMFED has established 5023 cooperative societies with 2.54 lakh membership – the highest among the eastern states.
- Fishery production levels are 0.27 million lakh MT.

All of the preceding data is from the Bihar government. Bihar's masons and labourers are doing most of the state's work.

These data demonstrate that Bihar is not a farmer-based state, but a state of mechanics and labourers. The population of farmers in the state is 7.7%. That is, 1,00,70,827 people are associated with farming; by contrast, 2,18,65,634 people work as mechanics and labourers. This represents 16.73% of the total population.

== National industrial corridor ==
=== Integrated Manufacturing Cluster, Gaya ===
For the development of an Integrated Manufacturing Cluster (IMC) in Bihar, the state government has identified land parcels of nearly 1670 acres in the Dobhi block, under the Sherghati subdivision in the Gaya district. The proposed IMC Gaya project site spans 13 revenue villages (mouzas). Land acquisition for the project is in process. The proposed site is located near National Highway (NH) 22 (Dobhi-Chatra road), which connects Gaya with Chatra district in Jharkhand. The site is located approximately 7 km from NH 19 (Golden Quadrilateral) – which connects Kolkata with Delhi – and approximately 40 km from the proposed New Paharpur station of the Eastern Dedicated Freight Corridor. Gaya International Airport is located approximately 25 km away.

To prepare the master planning and detailed engineering for IMC Gaya, the National Industrial Corridor Development Corporation (NICDC) has appointed a master planning consultant. Master planning is in an advanced stage.

== Sectors ==
=== Sugar ===
The Indian Business Directory states that the Bihar sugar industry has flourished in the two years or so, because of efforts taken by the state government to revive the industry. The sugar industry has benefited from the state's climate, which is very suitable for growing high-grade sugar cane. The main benefit of the industry is employing many people, especially in rural areas. Furthermore, the industry provides facilities for transport and communication, and it helps to develop rural areas by mobilising resources. The total number of sugar mills in the Bihar sugar industry is 28, of which only nine are operational. The total area under sugar cane production is 2.30 lakh hectares, and the total production of sugar cane is around 129.95 lakh MT. The sugar mills of the Bihar sugar industry are located in Samastipur, Gopalganj, Sitamarhi, West Champaran, Chorma, Dulipati and Supaul. The industry can be divided into two groups: the unorganised sector, which comprises traditional sweetener manufacturers, and the organised sector, which consists of sugar factories. The producers of traditional sweeteners are considered part of the rural industry, and they manufacture khandsari (unrefined brown sugar) and gur (unrefined cane sugar). These products are consumed mainly by rural people and are produced in substantial quantities. The total production of sugar in the Bihar sugar industry was 4.21 lakh tons in 2002–03, and 2.77 lakh tons in 2003–04. Again, in 2004–05, the figure was 2.77 lakh tons. The state government, to boost Bihar's sugar industry, has decided to privatise state-run sugar mills that have not operated for many years. The state government has also approved a proposal to set up 15 new sugar mills in the state, which will bring an investment of ₹3,771 crore for the Bihar sugar industry.

=== Brewery sector ===
The brewery sector, by contrast, received a major setback with the statewide ban on alcohol sale, consumption, and production by Chief Minister Nitish Kumar in 2015.

=== Leather ===
The state has a large cattle population; 50,000 footwear artisans; and private-sector tanneries. More tanneries and footwear units are planned for establishment in the private sector.

=== Cements ===
As in other parts of India, the cement industry in Bihar has flourished and grown significantly. There are many cement plants across the state. For example, the company ACC Cements has a plant in Patna. In addition, many other cement companies have invested in Bihar

=== Textile ===
The total number of weavers in Bihar is more than 90,000. Bhagalpur is known as the leading silk city. Gaya – another major weaving centre – has around 8000 weavers. There are strong traditional handloom clusters in the districts of Bhagalpur, Gaya, Nalanda, Darbhanga, Madhubani, Siwan and Patna. Infrastructure Leasing & Financial Services is preparing a project report on textile parks and also on cluster development programs. However, most of the textile centres in the state are in decline, producing low-value goods. Gaya is developing rapidly in the textile sector; approximately 10,000 looms are operational, and several new projects are expected to launch soon. Shuttleless and high-tech technology are also being widely adopted; in Nalanda Rajgir, too, the textile sector is developing.

=== Small-scale industries ===
Small-scale industries (SSIs) have contributed to Bihar's economic upsurge. The SSIs' total investment is ₹88.75 crore. Small or artisan-based industries are generating 5.5 lakh person-days in the current financial year until December.

== Key organisations ==
Bihar Industrial Area Development Authority

=== Railway factory ===
- Diesel Locomotive Factory, Marhowrah
- Carriage Repair Workshop, Harnaut
- Electric Locomotive Factory, Madhepura
- Jamalpur Locomotive Workshop
- Rail Wheel Plant, Bela

=== Security and intelligence services ===
Security Industry Specialists (SIS), an unlisted security company, has the largest workforce in the Asia-Pacific region, and the company is projected to generate ₹2,000 crore in revenue. SIS has more than 10,000 foreign nationals among its staff. The Patna-registered company achieved this scale through an acquisition: the Australian guard and mobile patrol services business divested from American conglomerate United Technologies Corp (UTC). The deal closed in August 2008. It includes Chubb Security, which is Australia's largest and oldest security company. Chubb Security earned $400 million last year. SIS is reportedly funding the acquisition through a mix of debt and internal accruals. SIS, ranked among India's top three security services firms, has 30,000 employees in India; the company is expected to add up to 80,000 by 2012. The company's approximately 2,500 clients include Tatas, Birlas, Reliance, SBI, PNB, ICICI, Hyundai, American Express, Essar, Coca-Cola, Pepsi, Idea and Wipro. Chairman / Managing Director Ravindra Kishore Sinha said, "From pedestrian Patna setting to the panoramic skyline of Sydney, it has been a long and rewarding journey", adding that SIS remains "rooted, registered and taxed in Bihar".

=== Sudha cooperative ===
Sudha Dairy, a cooperative, is one of the most successful government companies in India. An Indian Administrative Service (IAS) officer from Bihar, Ram Chandra Sinha, founded this cooperative. The cooperative's revenues from a range of milk and milk products have risen from $73.5 million in 2001–02 to $136 million in 2007; in 2018, revenues were reported as $279.6 million. The cooperative had 6,000 outlets covering 84 towns in the state, and more than 260,000 milk farmers were members in 2007–08. The cooperative now has 2,231 retailers and 25 plants (19 of which are dairy producers), with a total capacity of 3.1 million litres per day. Sudha Dairy also sells its products to other Indian states such as Uttar Pradesh, West Bengal, Jharkhand and Delhi.

=== Husk Power Systems ===
Husk Power Systems (HPS) is a Bihar-based start-up that provides power to thousands of rural Indians. HPS has created proprietary technology that cost-effectively converts rice husks into electricity. The organisation uses this technology to produce, own and operate 35–100 kW "mini power plants" that deliver electricity as a pay-for-use service to villages of 2000–4000 inhabitants in the Indian "Rice Belt". In 2009, the company won an inaugural competition for global business plans that was sponsored by venture capital firm Draper Fisher Jurvetson and Cisco Systems. The company will receive a $250,000 investment from DFJ Growth and Cisco to help advance the technology.

The company has since received two rounds of financing from the Shell Foundation. Two of the key founders of HPS are graduates of the Darden School of Business at the University of Virginia.

=== IOC Barauni refinery ===
The Indian Oil Corporation (IOC) Barauni refinery in Bihar was built in collaboration with the Soviet Union for ₹49.4 crore, and it went on stream in July 1964. The initial capacity of 2 MMT per year was expanded to 3 MMT per year by 1969. The present capacity of this refinery is 6.00 MMT per year. A Catalytic Reformer Unit (CRU) was added to the refinery in 1997 for the production of unleaded motor spirit. Additional projects are planned for meeting future fuel quality requirements.

The Government of India plans to develop a petrochemical plant alongside the refinery.

=== East Central Railway, Hajipur ===
Hajipur is Patna's only twin city; it is located nearest to the capital; and it shares most of its government offices, headquarters and educational institutions with the capital city. As another district headquarters, Hajipur has powers equivalent to those of the capital. It is one railway zone in the Indian railway system, i.e., East Central Railway zone. This zone comprises the following railway divisions: Samastipur, Danapur, Mugalsarai, Dhanbad and Sonepur.

=== Life Insurance Corporation – East Central Zone ===
The East Central Zone of the Life Insurance Corporation (LIC) comprises the following divisions: Muzaffarpur, Patna-1, Patna-2, Bhagalpur, Begusarai, Jamshedpur, Hazaribagh, Berhampur, Cuttack, Bhubaneshwar and Sambalpur.

=== National Thermal Power Corporation ===
The Eastern Region headquarters of major Indian power company NTPC is situated in Patna; the largest power plants in this region are Kahalgaon, Talchar and Farakka. Upcoming power plants in the region are Barh (Patna) and Nabinagar (Aurangabad).

=== Power Grid Corporation ===
Power Grid Corporation's Eastern Region, comprising Bihar and Jharkhand, has its headquarters at Shastri Nagar, Patna.
