= Media in Bihar =

Mass media in the Indian state

Media in Bihar started with Bihar Bandhu, the first Hindi newspaper published in Bihar.

== History ==
Bihar Bandhu was launched in 1872 by Keshav Ram Bhatta, a Maharashtrian Brahman who had settled in Biharsharif. Hindi journalism in Bihar, and specially Patna, made little headway at the time due to lack of respect for the Hindi language. Many Hindi publications did not last, or were shelved before launching. Hindi journalism also acquired wisdom and maturity, elements that took time for journalists to master.

Hindi was introduced in the law courts in Bihar in 1880 and started to have an impact in remote areas in Bihar.

The beginning of the 20th century was marked by notable new publications, including a monthly magazine, Bharat Ratna, published in Patna in 1901. It was followed by Kshatriya Hitaishi, Aryavarta from Dinapure, Patna. Udyoga and Chaitanya Chandrika. Udyog was edited by Vijyaanand Tripathy, a famous poet of the time, while Chaitanya Chandrika was edited by Krishna Chaitanya Goswami. Literary activities reached many districts of Bihar.

== Print ==
Popular Hindi newspapers in Bihar include the Hindustan Times, Dainik Jagran, Navbharat Times, Aj The Hindu and Prabhat Khabar. E-papers, such as the Bihar Times and Patna Daily, have become very popular among educated Biharis, especially those living outside the region. National English dailies like The Times of India and The Economic Times and Bihar Now are read in urban regions.

=== The Searchlight ===
In 1918, Dr. Sachidanand Sinha started the first English news publication from Patna, published biweekly, called the Searchlight. It became a tri-weekly in 1920 and then a daily in 1930. Due to various reasons, its publication was paused for five times. Many people supported the efforts to start Searchlight, anchored by a forward nationalist editorial outlook, including Dr. Rajendra Prasad, who was one of the founding members of the paper with Syed Hyder Hussain and Maheshwar Prasad being the Searchlight's first two editors. In its first few decades, Murli Manohar Prasad was its longest-serving editor, who also went to jail for his outspoken style of articles in the newspaper against the British. Later, K. Ramarao, M. Sharma, D.K. Sharda, T.J.S. George, S.C. Sarkar, S.K. Rao, and R.K. Makkar were other notable figures heading its editorial office in Patna.

Along with its flagship English paper, Searchlight also tried to diversify itself into the Hindi press. In 1947, it had a Hindi counterpart with the launch of Pradeep from Patna, which was the most sought-after source of news during the anti-corruption JP Movement of the early 1970s. The newspapers suffered a lot because of revealing the truth. Many times the state government not only stopped its government advertisements, but in 1974, chaotic elements even set fire to the searchlight building.

During the paper's early days, most of the judges of the Patna High Court were British. The Searchlight with Murli Manohar Prasad as the editor, printed several articles during 1928 and 1929 that interpreted various observations made by judges of the Patna High Court as derogatory and hurting the sentiments of the Hindu community. These articles were considered by the High Court with Sir Courtney Terrell as its Chief Justice as contempt of court. The editor at that time was Murli Manohar Prasad. Motilal Nehru, Sir Tej Narayan Sapru and Sarat Chandra Bose came as lawyers in Patna High Court in defence of Searchlight supporting the newspaper and its editor Murli Manohar Prasad.

Sir Sultan Ahmed advocated on behalf of the government. A bench of 5 judges was formed under the chairmanship of the Chief Justice and the newspaper was found guilty. Searchlight was fined Rs 200. Though it is not decisively known who paid the fine, in those days it was discussed that the fine has been paid by the Chief Justice himself.

Later, the Chief Justice Sir Courtney Terrell who was the Chief Justice of Patna High Court for ten consecutive years, and Murli Manohar Prasad, met at the residence of Dr. Sachidanand Sinha and the Chief Justice was impressed by the integrity of the editor. Later Terrell assumed an Indian pseudonym and began contributing articles to Searchlight. His articles were in favour of India's independence and supported the cause of India's freedom movement. Only the editor knew this.

According to the famous historian Dr. K. K. Dutt, 'The history of searchlight is the history of the freedom struggle.'

=== Modern Newspapers ===
In the latter half of the 1980s, the Birla Group had already acquired Searchlight and Pradeep. However, it didn't tinker with their editorial functioning and content creation in Patna. Then in 1986, the Birla Group decided that it was time for their national papers — Hindustan Times and Hindustan — to enter the Bihar media market. To pave the way for its national papers, Searchlight and Pradeep were shut down altogether.

The market leader in the English newspaper segment, the Times of India, soon followed suit, starting its Patna edition in the late 1980s.

Dainik Jagran, Prabhat Khabar and Dainik Bhaskar also play a lead role in media industry.

== TV and radio ==
Several national and international television channels are popular in Bihar. DD Bihar, Sahara Bihar, and ETV Bihar-Jharkhand are the channels dedicated specifically to Bihar. In 2008, two dedicated Bhojpuri channels, called Mahuaa TV, and Purva TV were launched.

Several government radio channels exist in Bihar. All India Radio has stations in Bhagalpur, Darbhanga, Patna, Purnea, and Sasaram. Other government radio channels include Gyan Vani in Patna; Radio Mirchi, also in Patna; and Radio Dhamaal in Muzaffarpur.

- General TV
  - Mahuaa TV
  - Hamar TV
  - DD Bihar
- News TV
  - News18 Bihar-Jharkhand
  - Kashish News
  - Sadhna News
- Radio Government
  - All India Radio, Bhagalpur, (1458 kHz)
  - All India Radio, Darbhanga, (1296 kHz)
  - All India Radio, Patna, (102.5 MHz, 621 kHz)
  - All India Radio, Purnea, (102.3 MHz)
  - All India Radio, Sasaram, (103.4 MHz)
  - Gyan Vani, Patna, (105.6 MHz)
- Radio (Private)
  - Radio Mirchi, Patna, (98.3 MHz)
  - Radio Dhamaal (Now Radio Orange), Muzaffarpur,
  - Red FM, Patna, Muzaffarpur,
  - Radio City (Patna)
  - Big FM, Patna, Muzaffarpur
  - FM Tadka, Muzaffarpur

Digital media is rapidly growing in bihar.It has now become most popular media sector in bihar.

Some famous portals are Bihar Tak, Live Cities, First Bihar, News4nation, ABP Bihar, City Post Live

- Main Media
- Gaam Ghar
- Aapna Bihar
- Insider Live News
- Samastipur News

== Cinema ==
Bihar has a film industry. Small Maithili and Angika language film industries also operate. The first Bhojpuri film Ganga Maiyya Tohe Piyari Chadhaibo. "Lagi Nahin Chute Ram" is recognized as a classic. Released at the same time as Mughal-E-Azam, the former generated significant interest in eastern and northern regions. Nadiya Ke Paar is among the most famous Bhojpuri movies. Bhojpuri film industry made history in 1962 with the well-received film Ganga Maiyya Tohe Piyari Chadhaibo ("Mother Ganges, I will offer you a yellow sari"), directed by Kundan Kumar. Throughout the following decades, releases were infrequent. Films such as Bidesiya ("Foreigner," 1963, directed by S. N. Tripathi) and Ganga ("Ganges," 1965, directed by Kundan Kumar) were profitable and popular in Bihar, but in general Bhojpuri films were not commonly produced in the 1960s and 1970s.

In the 1980s, enough Bhojpuri films were produced to nourish an industry. Films such as Mai ("Mom," 1989, directed by Rajkumar Sharma) and Hamar Bhauji ("My Brother's Wife," 1983, directed by Kalpataru) continued to have at least sporadic success at the box office. However, this trend faded out by the end of the decade, and by 1990, the nascent industry seemed finished.

The industry took off again in 2001 with the hit Saiyyan Hamar ("My Sweetheart" directed by Mohan Prasad), which shot the film's lead actor, Ravi Kishan, to stardom. These successes led to dramatic increases in visibility, and the industry grew to support an awards show and a trade magazine, Bhojpuri City that chronicles the production and release of what are now over one hundred films per year. Many Bollywood stars, including Amitabh Bachchan and Ajay Devgan have worked in Bhojpuri films.
