= Ahar Pyne =

Indian agricultural system

Ahar Pyne or Ahar-Pyne refers to a traditional agricultural system in South Bihar, India, using channels and retention ponds to manage water resources. The system was widely used in South Bihar for centuries before declining in the 20th century, but is seeing renewed interest in the 21st century.

== Description ==
Ahar-pynes originated in South Bihar, Eastern India. The region is dominated by fertile plains which make South Bihar a productive agricultural center. However, the region's terrain also leaves it prone to negative environmental effects. During years with a heavy summer monsoon the plains are prone to severe flooding, while during years with a weak monsoon the area suffers from droughts - both effects harm agricultural production and damage the local environment. South Bihar is also home to a number of small, fast-flowing tributary rivers that swell during rains and exasperate flooding.

To adapt to the region's unpredictable weather, Bihari farmers developed a system of agriculture known as ahar-pynes. Under the system, channels (pynes) are dug into the soil - allowing for water to flow - with raised embankments on the sides. The channel is interspersed with small retention ponds (ahars), useful for collecting excess water. The design of the system serves a dual purpose, draining water during floods and retaining water during droughts. The system also allows for the establishing of crop-yielding patties on the sides of the channel and around the ponds. Correct usage of the system can allow for farmers to plant two crops a year, increasing food security and bringing in extra income.

Ahar-pynes are traditionally established by hand, with individual farmers often owning several different parts of the channel. Some of the channels are long enough to supply water to multiple villages and can extend for dozens of kilometres. As noted by some sources, this communal ownership entices the local community to maintain the system regardless of caste (though historically some castes were assigned different roles while maintaining the system) or economic status. The work of maintaining ahar-pynes was historically split between local governments and farmers, a tradition collectively known as Kudimaramathu; individual farmers were expected to clear their patties of silt and other obstructions (a system known as goam), while governments performed more extensive maintenance. Maintenance was community-sourced, and government work was paid for with a fee known as the Gilandazi. The combined result of these efforts was the creation of a community-sustained cheap and effective means of managing water resources.

=== Decline ===
Ahar-pynes were an important part of the South Bihari economy for centuries (some sources attribute the system to the Magadha kingdom, making it several thousand years old), as they were a cheap, easily-repairable way to manage water resources. By the early 20th century local governments had established registries to organize the distribution of water rights, and 35% of South Bihar's cropped land was being cultivated using water supplied by ahar-pynes. However, usage of ahar-pynes greatly declined in the 20th century as the South Bihari population began to adopt more modern agricultural techniques, such as tube wells (which are heavily subsidized by the Indian government). Many older ahar-pynes were abandoned and fell into disrepair, with some becoming receptacles for waste water.

=== Revival ===
In the 21st century, renewed attention has led to some sources advocating for the re-establishments of ahar-pynes. Proponents of the system cite the cheap cost of establishing ahar-pynes when compared to large-scale irrigation projects, and note that the community-driven history of the system will reduce maintenance costs while increasing the wealth of the local populace.
