= Emblem of Bihar =

Seal of Bihar

- Armiger: The Government of Bihar
- Adopted: Between 1930-1935
- Shield: Bodhi Tree with Prayer beads
- Supporters: Swastikas
- Compartment: (Urdu for "Bihar") inscribed on a brick at the bottom

The Emblem of Bihar is the official seal of the Indian state of Bihar. It was officially adopted by the Government of Bihar during British rule between 1930 and 1935.

== Design ==
The state symbol of Bihar features two swastikas in front of a picture of a Bodhi tree with prayer beads. And the foundation base is brick where the Urdu word for Bihar (بہار) is carved.

== Historical emblems ==
Following the 1935 passage of the State Reorganisation Act, a recommendation to that effect was forwarded to the Royal Society, leading to the adoption of the Bo tree symbol in the emblem.

The Bodhi Tree is represented by the Bo tree. It comes from the Sinhala word bo, which means the Bodhi tree.

This was the enormous, old sacred fig tree (Ficus religiosa - Moraceae) under which Gautam Buddha, the founder of Buddhism and its spiritual teacher, is said to have attained enlightenment. Bodh Gaya is located about 100 kilometres south of Patna.

The balance of opposites, universal harmony, and Dharma are symbolised by the two Swastikas. The word derives from the Sanskrit word svastika, which is made up of the suffix -ka, the words su (which means "good") and asti (which means "to be"). Therefore, the logo represents Bihar as the land of nice people.

Badge of British Bihar and Orissa

== Government banner ==
The Government of Bihar can be represented by a banner displaying the emblem of the state on a white field.

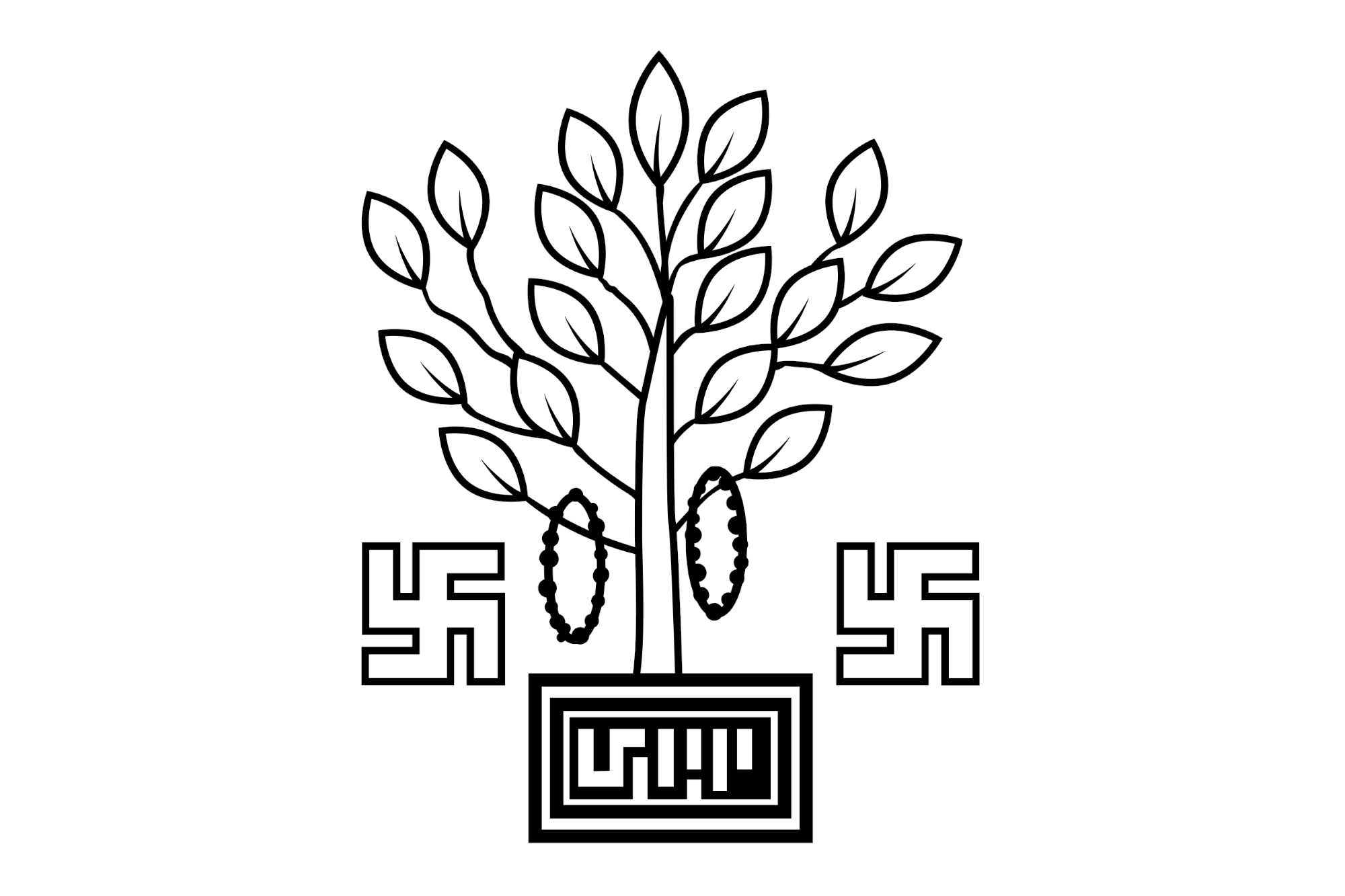
Banner of Bihar

== See also ==
- National Emblem of India
- List of Indian state emblems
