= State Highway 48 (Bihar) =

Former road in Bihar, India

State Highway 48

Route information
- Length: 50 km (31 mi)

Major junctions
- South end: Hajipur
- North end: Muzaffarpur

Location
- Country: India
- State: Bihar

Highway system
- Roads in India; Expressways; National; State; Asian; State Highways in Bihar

State Highway 48 (SH-48) was a state highway in Bihar State. This state highway used to pass through three districts (Vaishali district, Samastipur district, Muzaffarpur district) and links with major National highways and main district roads.

At present, there is no State Highway in Bihar with number 48. The Hajipur-Muzaffarpur is a national highway (NH-22).
