= Cricket in Bihar =

Cricket in Bihar may refer to:

- Bihar Cricket Association
- Bihar cricket team
  - Bihar Cricket team in Vijay Hazare Trophy
  - Bihar cricket team in Ranji Trophy
- Bihar cricketers
