= Floods in Bihar =

Flooding in the Indian state of Bihar

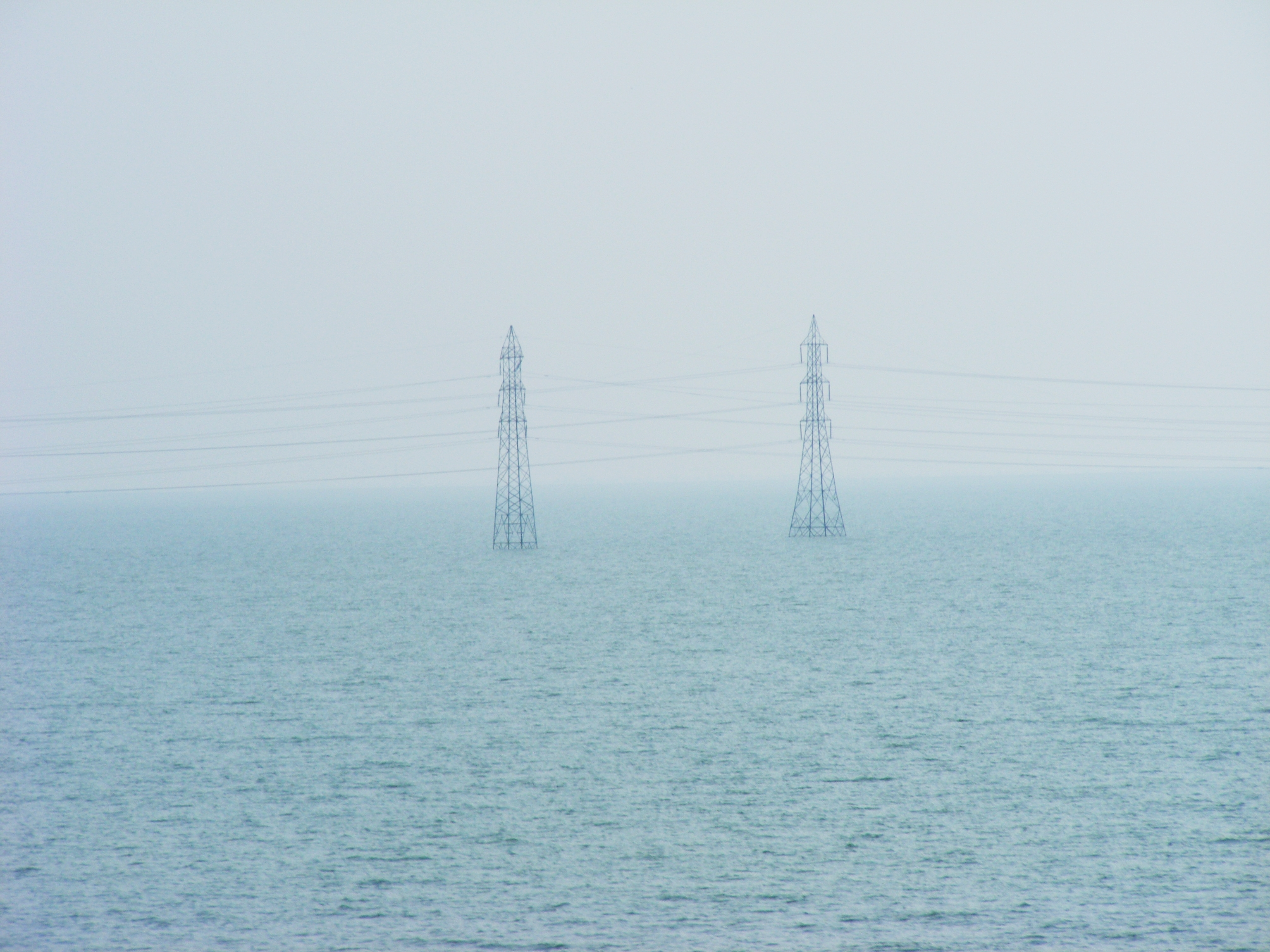
A view of 2008 Bihar flood

Bihar is recognized as India's most flood-prone state, with approximately 76% of the population in North Bihar living under the persistent threat of severe flooding. Bihar makes up 16.5% of India's flood-affected area and contains 22.1% of India's flood-affected population. About 73.06% of Bihar's geographical area, 68,800 square kilometres (26,600 sq mi) out of 94,160 square kilometres (36,360 sq mi), is affected. Each year, floods kill many and damage livestock and other assets worth millions. In total, floods have claimed 9,500 lives since the government started publishing figures in 1979. North Bihar districts are vulnerable to at least five major flood-causing rivers during monsoon – the Mahananda, Koshi, Bagmati, Burhi Gandak, and Gandak rivers – which originate in Nepal. Some South Bihar districts have also become vulnerable to floods, from the Son, Punpun, and Phalgu rivers. The 2013 flood affected over 5.9 million people in 3,768 villages in 20 districts in the state. The 2017 flood affected 19 districts in North Bihar, killing 514 people and affecting over 17 million.

== Causes of flooding ==
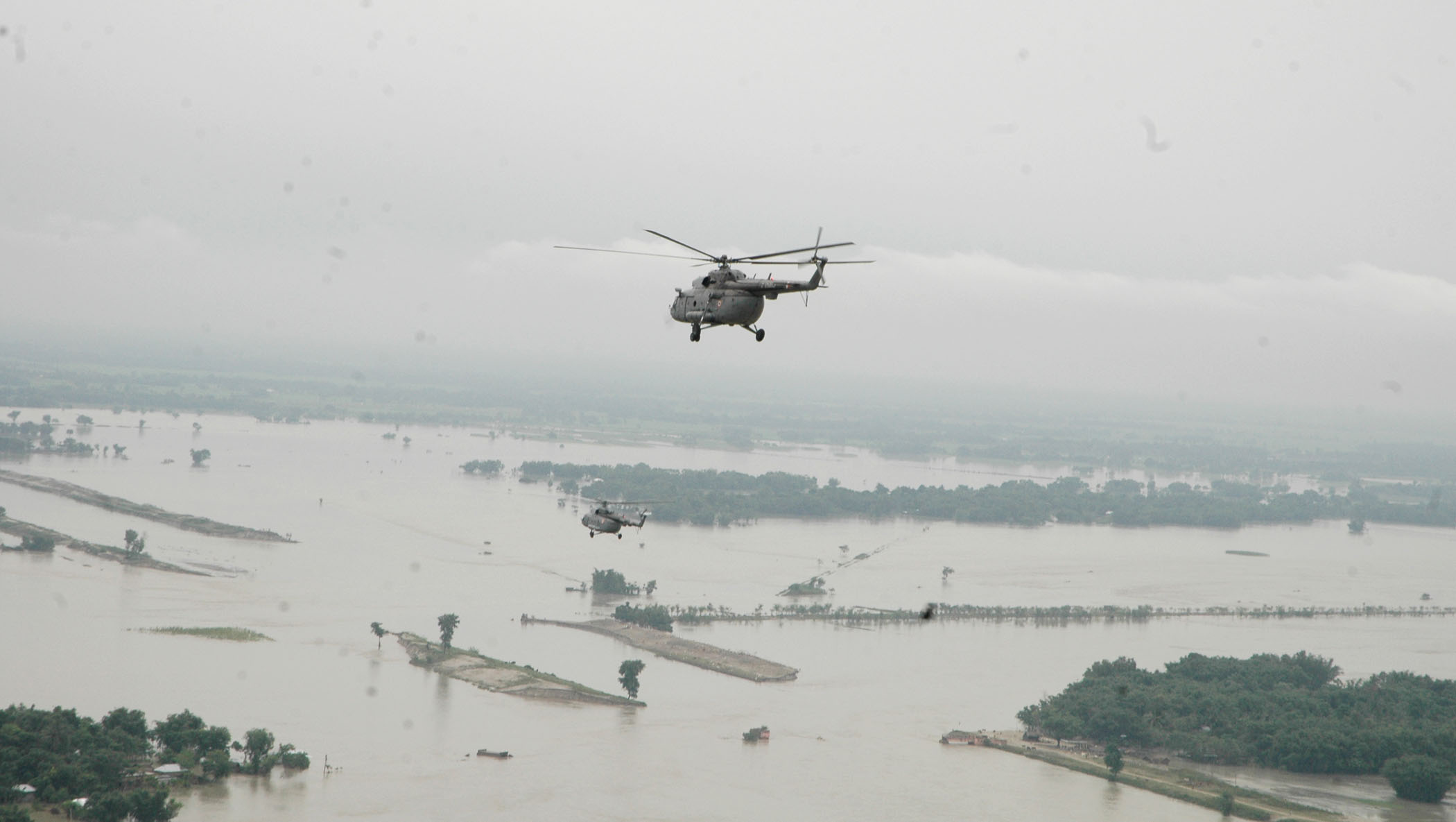
Manmohan Singh carried out an aerial survey of the flood-affected areas of Bihar with chairperson, UPA, Smt. Sonia Gandhi, the Union Home Minister, Shri Shivraj V. Patil, the Union Minister for Railways, Shri Lalu Prasad.

Geographically, Nepal is a mountainous region. When heavy rains occur in the mountains of central and eastern Nepal the water flows into the major drainages of the Narayani, Bagmati, and Koshi rivers. As these rivers cross into India they break their banks and flood the plains and lowlands of Bihar. To protect the Koshi River's embankments as well as the Koshi Barrage, or sluice gates, Indian engineers who are in charge of the dam in Nepal, open the sluice gates, which can cause flooding downriver in Bihar. In 2008, during a high-flow episode, a breach in the East Koshi afflux embankment, above the barrage, occurred and the Koshi river, known as the Sorrow of Bihar, found an old channel, near the border with Nepal and India, it had abandoned over 100 years previously. Approximately 15 million people were affected as the river broke its embankment at Kusaha in Nepal, submerging several districts of Nepal and India. 95% of the Koshi's total flowed through the new course.

=== Embankments ===
A recent fact-finding report on the Kosi floods of 2008 – prepared by a civilian organization, the Fact Finding Mission on the Kosi, composed of various experts such as Sudhirendar Sharma, Dinesh Kumar Mishra, and Gopal Krishna – highlighted the fact that although India has built over 3000 km of embankments in Bihar over the last few decades, the propensity for flooding has increased by 2.5 times during the same time period, mention that embankments failed during each major flooding event.

The report, titled Kosi Deluge: The Worst is Still to Come, stressed that embankments straitjacket the river. In the case of the Kosi, it found that because of siltation the river bed had risen several feet in relation to the adjoining land. The high and low lands separated by embankments have created a situation where the lowlands have become permanently waterlogged. Sixteen per cent of the land mass of north Bihar is permanently waterlogged.

In 1954, when Bihar's flood policy was introduced, Bihar had approximately 160 km of embankments. At that time, the flood-prone area in the state was estimated to be 2.5 million hectares. Upon completion of the system of embankments, 3,465 km had been constructed and were administered by the Water Resources Department (WRD). However, the amount of flood-prone land had increased to 6.89 million hectares by 2004.

=== Farakka Barrage ===
The recent period has seen serious interruption in the dynamic equilibrium of the river, hindering the natural oscillation of the river within its meandering belt. The meandering belt of the Ganges in Malda and Murshidabad districts is 10 km wide. Upstream of the Farakka Barrage, the water level of the Ganges has risen about 8 meters. The river, which flowed in a South Easterly course between Rajmahal and Farakka during early decades of this century, has now formed a concentration of meander loops to accommodate the additional discharged due to the barrage. Due to the obstruction caused by the Barrage, each year nearly 640 million tonnes of silt are accumulated in the riverbed. In the last three decades this has resulted in the accumulation of nearly 18.56 billion tonnes of silt.

Farakka barrage has led to following problems upstream of the barrage:

- Interception of the flow channel being changed from straight to oblique
- Sedimentation (640 x106 metric tonnes per year)
- Reduction of the cross-sectional area
- Declining slope of the long profile
- Widening of the river and increasing length
- Increase in flood frequency and magnitude
- Reduction of flora and fauna in the river, specially the Hilsha fish.

A 2016 Central Water Commission (CWC) report on Bihar floods states that the Farakka Barrage, even under the worst scenario, can impact areas up to 42 km upstream, due to a backwater effect. Patna is located about 400 km upstream. The report blamed the number of banana plantations on the river bank between Patna and Bhagalpur as one of the reasons for the floods, based on the assessment of 100 years of flooding of the Ganga. The CWC report stated that the sedimentation in Ganga, in Bihar, is basically due to huge sediment load contributed from its northern tributaries – the Ghaghra, Gandak and Kosi rivers. The flood-affected area in Bihar was 2.5 million hectares in 1954 when the length of all embankments in Bihar was 160 km, but the flood-affected area increased to 7.295 million hectares in 2016, after the construction of 3731 km of embankments.

=== Contributing water sources ===
North Bihar is within the flood plains of eight major rivers, all of which are tributaries of the Ganges.

- Ghaghra
- Gandak
- Budhi Gandak
- Bagmati
- Kamala
- Bhutahi Balan
- Kosi
- Mahananda

== Statistics ==
Damages in Bihar Due to Flood, 1979–2006
Year	Districts	Blocks	Panchayats	Villages	Humans (100,000)	Animals (100,000)	Total Area (100,000 ha)	Farmed Areas (100,000 ha)	Crop Damage (100,000 INR)	Houses Damaged	Public Property Damaged (100,000 INR)
2006	14	63	375	959	10.89	0.1	1.81	0.87	706.63	18,637	8,456.17
2005	12	81	562	1,464	21.04	5.35	4.6	1.35	1,164.50	5,538	305
2004	20	211	2,788	9,346	212.99	86.86	27	13.99	52,205.64	929,773	103,049.60
2003	24	172	1,496	5,077	76.02	11.96	15.08	6.1	6,266.13	45,262	1,035.16
2002	25	6	2,504	8,318	160.18	52.51	19.69	9.4	51,149.61	419,014	40,892.19
2001	22	194	1,992	6,405	90.91	11.7	11.95	6.5	26,721.79	222,074	18,353.78
2000	33	213	2,327	12,351	90.18	8.09	8.05	4.43	8,303.70	343,091	3,780.66
1999	24	150	1,604	5,057	65.66	13.58	8.45	3.04	24,203.88	91,813	5,409.99
1998	28	260	2,739	8,347	134.7	30.93	25.12	12.84	36,696.68	199,611	9,284.04
1997	26	169	1,902	7,043	69.65	10.11	14.71	6.55	5,737.66	174,379	2,038.09
1996	29	195	2,049	6,417	67.33	6.6	11.89	7.34	7,169.29	116,194	1,035.70
1995	26	177	1,901	8,233	66.29	8.15	9.26	4.24	19,514.32	297,765	2,183.57
1994	21	112	1,045	2,755	40.12	15.03	6.32	3.5	5,616.33	33,876	151.66
1993	18	124	1,263	3,422	53.52	6.68	15.64	11.35	13,950.17	219,826	3,040.86
1992	8	19	170	414	5.56	0.75	0.76	0.25	58.09	1,281	0.75
1991	24	137	1,336	4,096	48.23	5.13	9.8	4.05	2,361.03	27,324	139.93
1990	24	162	1,259	4,178	39.57	2.7	8.73	3.21	1,818.88	11,009	182.27
1989	16	74	652	1,821	18.79	0.35	4.71	1.65	704.88	7,746	83.7
1988	23	181	1,616	5,687	62.34	0.21	10.52	3.95	4,986.32	14,759	150.64
1987	30	382	6,112	24,518	286.62	33.25	47.5	25.7	67,881.00	1,704,999	680.86
1986	23	189	1,828	6,509	75.8	-	19.18	7.97	10,513.51	136,774	3,201.99
1985	20	162	1,245	5,315	53.09	-	7.94	4.38	3,129.52	103,279	204.64
1984	23	239	3,209	11,154	135	-	30.5	15.87	18,543.85	310,405	2,717.72
1983	22	138	1,224	4,060	42.41	-	18.13	5.78	2,629.25	38,679	258.14
1982	15	110	1,112	3,708	46.81	45.14	9.32	3.23	9,700.00	68,242	955.33
1981	21	201	2,138	7,367	69.47	74.83	12.61	7.71	7,213.19	75,776	-
1980	21	193	1,869	7,010	74.45	-	17.86	9.43	7,608.43	118,507	-
1979	13	110	-	-	37.38	-	8.06	2.74	1,901.52	27,816	-

== 2026 floods ==
Bihar experienced three spells of flooding in 2026, in mid-July, in the last week of August and from September, the last of which was the longest and was driven mainly by the Ganga, Sone and Punpun rivers. On 5 September the Ganga at Gandhi Ghat in Patna crossed the previous highest flood level of 50.52 metres, set in August 2016. Highest flood levels were also exceeded at Pandarak and Hathidah in Patna district and at Sultanganj in Bhagalpur district. By 13 September the state Disaster Management Department reported that 48.70 lakh people had been affected in 88 blocks across 15 districts. Rainfall in Bihar between 1 June and 13 September was 27 per cent below normal.

== See also ==
- 1987 Bihar flood
- 2004 Bihar flood
- 2007 Bihar flood
- 2008 Indian floods
- 2013 North India floods
- 2013 Bihar flood
- 2017 Bihar flood
- 2019 Bihar floods
- Koshi Flood 2024

== Gallery ==
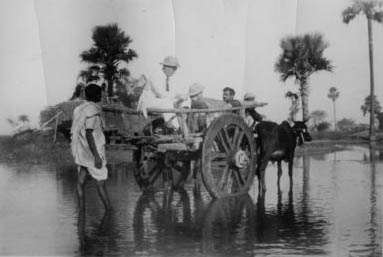
An old picture of 1935 flood in flood

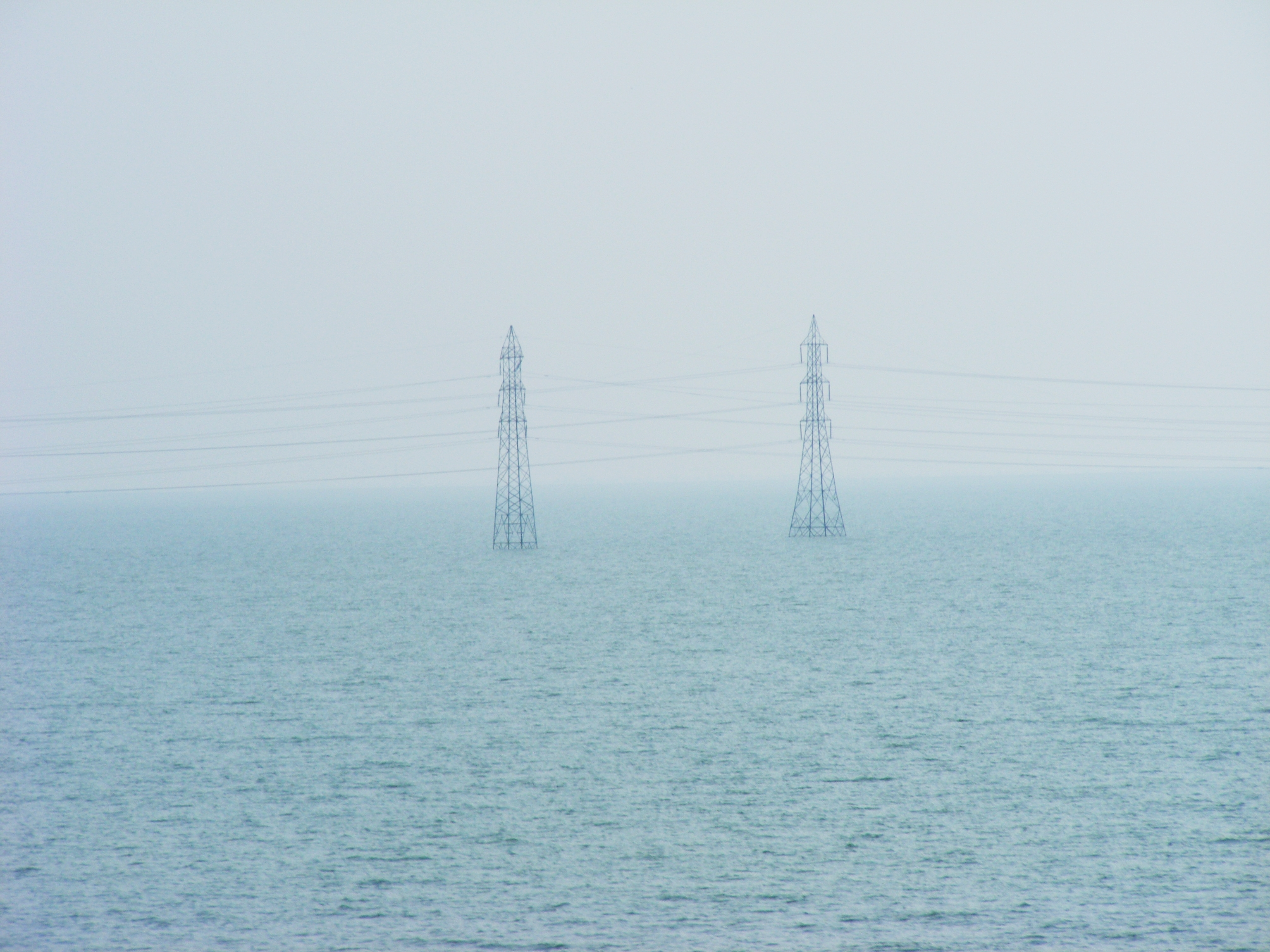
A view of 2008 Bihar flood

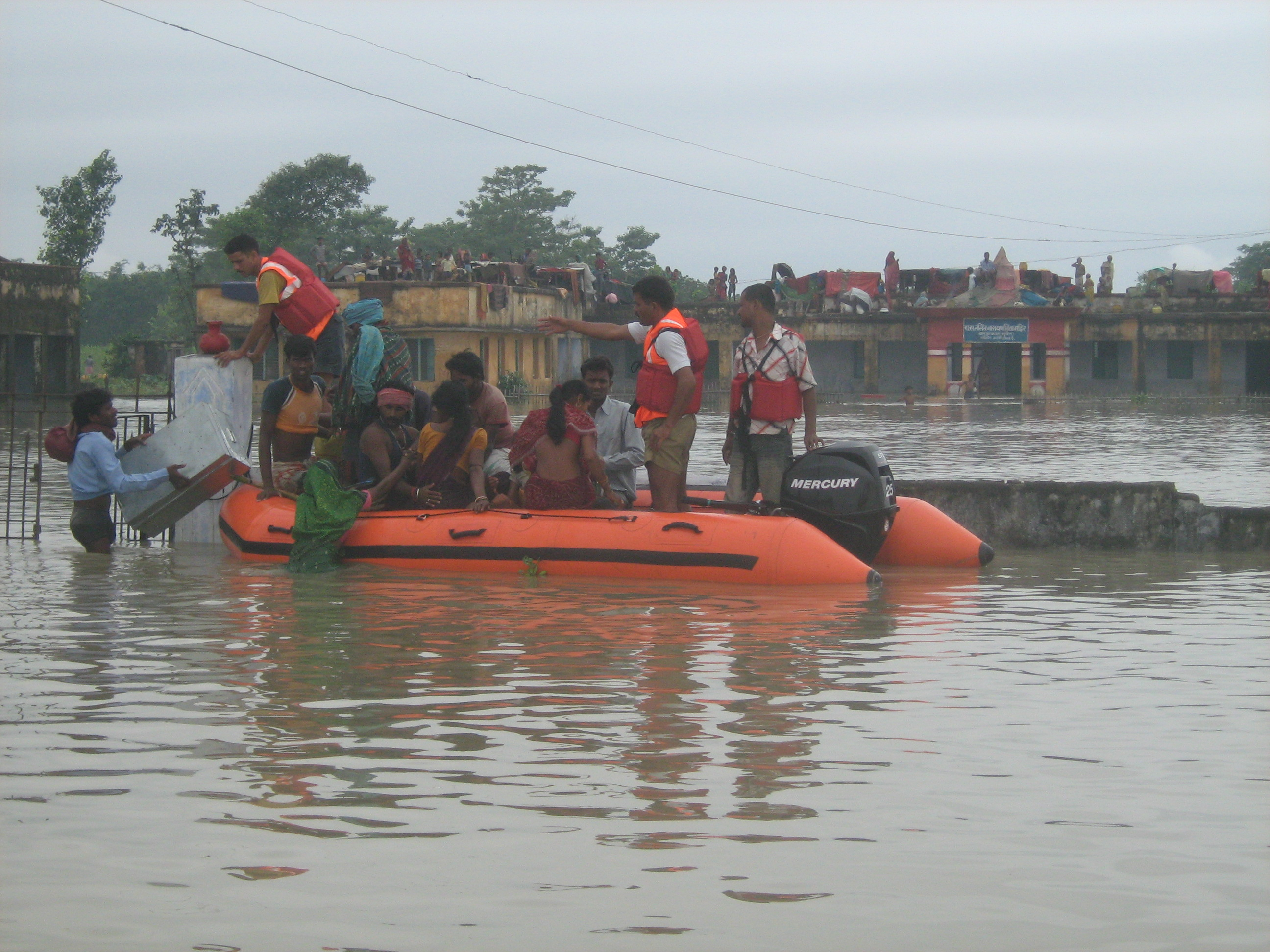
NDRF in 2008 Bihar flood

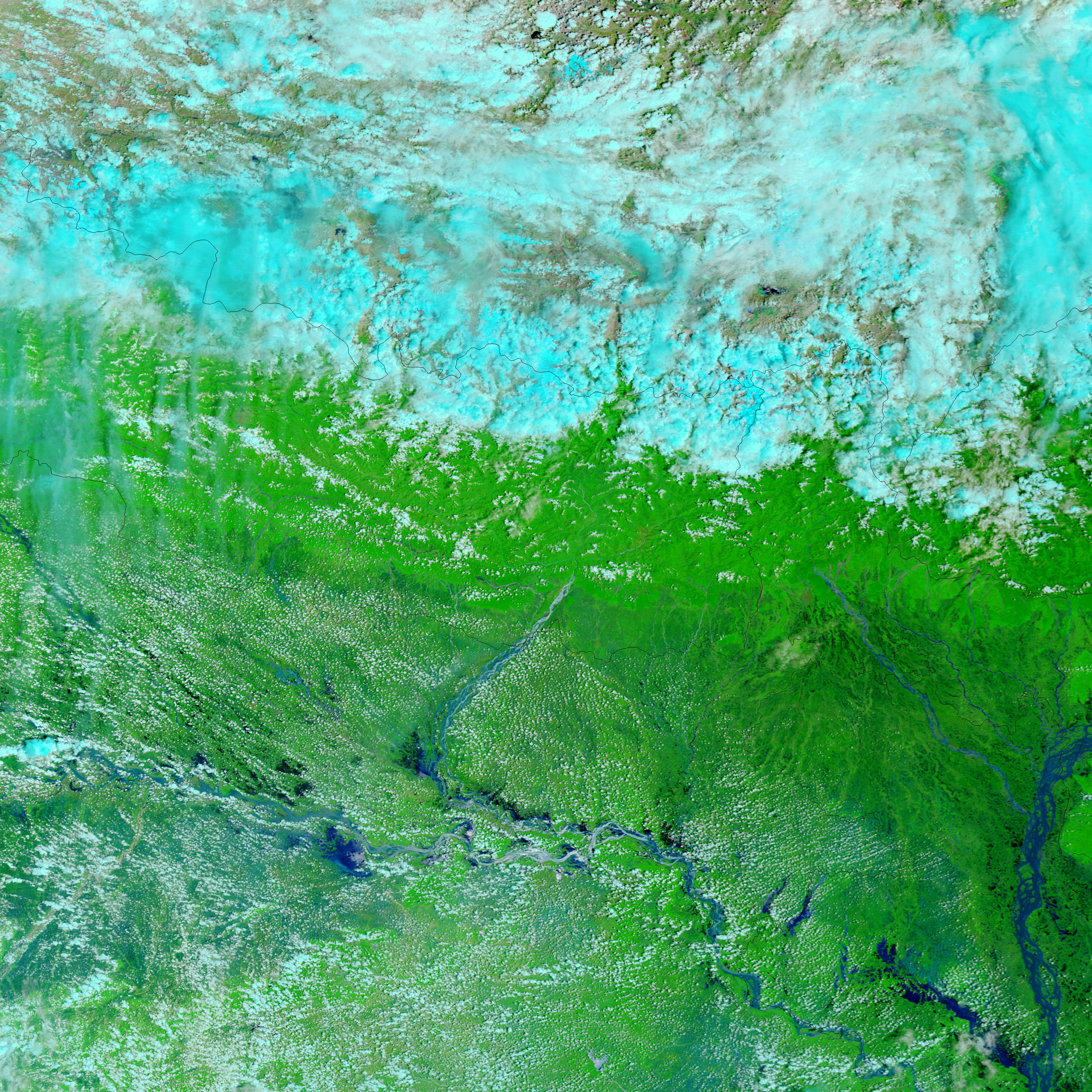
The Kosi before it flooded in August 2008

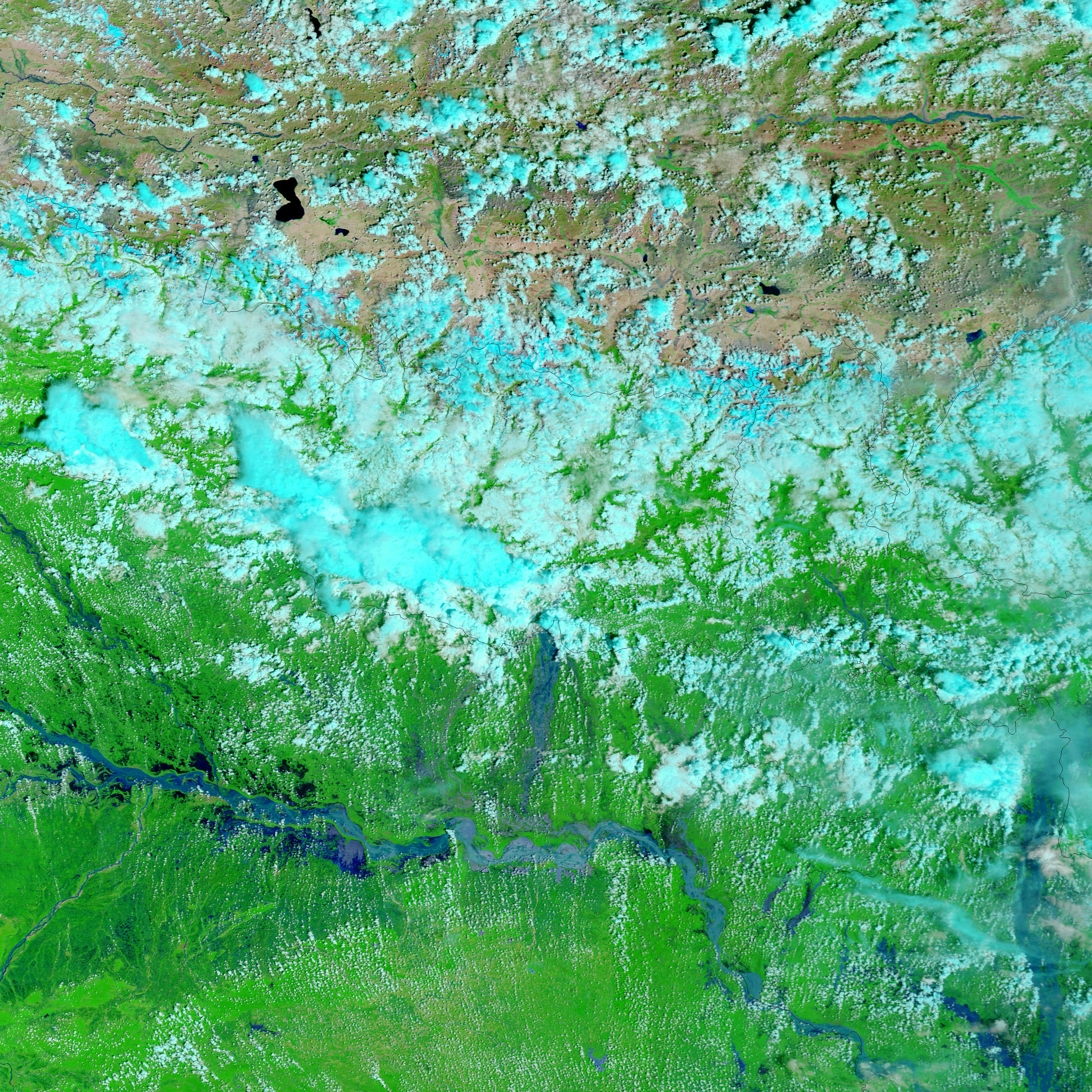
The Kosi during the August 2008 flood
