= Dhap (disambiguation) =

Dhap is a market center in western Nepal.

Dhap may also refer to:

- Dihydroxyacetone phosphate (DHAP), an anion
- DHAP (chemotherapy), a chemotherapy regimen
- Dhap Dam, in Bagmati Province, Nepal
- Dhap, a version of khoa, a dairy food
- Dhap dance and dhap instrument in folk dance forms of Odisha

== See also ==
- Dhapa (disambiguation)
