= Saptakoshi High Dam =

Proposed flood control and hydroelectric project in Nepal

Saptakosi High Dam, also called Koshi High Dam, is a multipurpose project proposed to be constructed on the Saptakoshi River of Nepal. The project is primarily aimed to control floods in south-eastern Nepal and northern Bihar of India, and to generate hydro power. An issue subsequently coming with this project is Nepal’s access to sea port via 165km long navigation canal linking to Calcutta sea port through River Ganges.

After catastrophe (Koshi changing course breaking the embankments) by erosion of embankments Koshi Barrage in 2008 and the 52 year old barrage's decaying life has given additional pressure to both governments for thinking about its alternative. Both governments of India and Nepal have begun studies for the preparation of a detailed project report (DPR) of the Project and Sun Kosi Storage-cum-Diversion Scheme. A Joint Project Office (JPO) was set up in Nepal for investigation of the project in August 2004.

== Background ==
Koshi High Dam is a project that was studied, surveyed and revised by various authorities from centuries. In the history there were many notable heavy floods on Koshi river killing thousands and displacing millions people. To prevent losses first survey was conducted by British India Major J Renal in around 1779. Subsequently James Fargusan studied in 1863 and later A.F. Ceiling Field studied Koshi flood. British authority has reached to a decision of constructing embankments after the devastating flood of 1869-70.

British made an agreement with Rana rulers of Nepal to construct dam in Sunsari and Saptari districts of Nepal but the project failed after the flood of May 1891. On 27 February 1897 Prime Minister Bir Shamsher Rana approved British India to construct a dam below Barahachhetra. Again in 1944 an American company studied for the British which suggested to construct dam in Churiya range. Following it a commission headed by Rayabahadur Ayodhyanath Khosala studied Koshi on ground in January 1946. He suggested to construct dam 1.6 Kilometer upstream from Barahakshetra area.

After independence India Government formed commission headed by engineer S.P.Prasad which suggested to construct 25.91 meter high dam in Prasad which ended up with Koshi Agreement 25 April 1954 and amended in 1966. Following the agreement India constructed the present Koshi Barrage (completed 24 April 1965).

Construction of Koshi Barrage gave a great relief to people in Bihar for long time but even it couldn't solve the problem. Concept of Saptakoshi High Dam was reinstated after Indian P.M. Atal Bihari Vajpayee introduced Indian Rivers Inter-link project in 2005. Sapta Koshi River is one of the major tributary branch of the Ganges river system that originates from the Himalaya and meets Ganga at Bihar. Koshi causes floods in Nepal and India every year. A big landmass of Bihar is affected by Koshi flood every year. Therefore Koshi is known as ‘sorrow of Bihar’

== Criticism ==
From the very beginning, the project has been criticized. The main issue raised against the ambitious project is its environmental and social impact. As currently outlined, the dam would displace over 100,000 people from the land covered by the dam.

== See also ==
- Koshi Barrage
- 2008 Indian floods
- Flood in Bihar
- Kosi River
- Koshi embankment
- List of dams and reservoirs in Nepal
