= 2017 Bihar flood =

Flood in Bihar, India

2017 North Bihar Flood
- Date: August 2017
- Location: North Bihar, India
- Deaths: 514 people

2017 Bihar floods affected 19 districts of North Bihar causing death of 514 people. 2,371 panchayats (settlement councils) under 187 blocks of 19 districts of Northern Bihar have been affected in the flood. Around 1.71 crore (17.1 million) people were hit by the floods. Over 8.5 lakhs of people have lost their homes, with Araria district alone accounting for 2.2 lakh homeless people. 2017 Flood has broken 9-Year record of deaths In Bihar. Bihar is India's most flood-prone State, with 76% of the population in the North Bihar living under the recurring threat of flood devastation. Devastating flood was caused due to excess heavy rainfall in monsoon season.

== Events ==
This flood was result of sudden increase in water discharge due to torrential rain in the foothill of the Himalayas in Nepal and adjoining areas in Bihar between August 12 and 20 led to flash flood in various rivers — Gandak, Burhi Gandak and Bagmati, Kamla, Kosi and Mahananda — due to heavy rain in the catchment areas of the major rivers of North Bihar in Nepal.

The floods have affected in 19 districts of North Bihar- Kishanganj, Araria, Purnia, Katihar, Eastern Champaran, Western Champaran, Darbhanga, Madhubani, Muzaffarpur, Sitamadhi, Shivar, Samastipur, Gopalganj, Saran, Siwan, Supaul, Madhepura, Saharsa and Khagaria. The casualties in four districts of Purnia division (Araria Katihar, Kishanganj and Purnia) stands at 160 deaths. Araria district accounted for 95 deaths alone, followed by Sitamarhi (43), West Champaran (36), Katihar (40), East Champaran (19) while 25 have died in Madhubani, Supaul (13) and Madhepura (15). 24 deaths were reported in Kishanganj, while Darbhanga accounted for 19 deaths, Purnea (9), Gopalganj (9), Sheohar (4), Muzaffarpur (7), Samastipur (1) and Saharsa (4) registered four deaths each while Khagaria and Saran accounted for 13 deaths each. No deaths were reported from Siwan. Bihar government records put animal deaths in the State at 192; it announced compensation of ₹30,000 for the loss of every milch cow and buffalo and ₹3,000 for a goat.

The swollen Gandak engulfed about 168 villages and 44 panchayats under 8 blocks of Saran district- Panapur, Taraiya, Parsa, Maker, Dariapur, Amnour, Marhoura and Masrakh.

East Central Railway (ECR) division suffers Rs 47 crore (7.3 million USD) loss due to floods in Bihar, in which Rs 26.60 crore (4.1 million USD) has been lost to infrastructure damage of railway property, while more than Rs 20 crore (3.1 million USD) has been lost in passenger revenue due to cancellation of trains.

== Relief operation ==
On 26 August 2017, Prime Minister Narendra Modi announced a Rs 500 crore (78 million USD) central assistance for flood hit areas of Bihar and ex gratia of Rs 2 lakh to the next of kin of each of the deceased from the PM Relief Fund,

AIMIM Chief Asaduddin Owaisi party donated over ₹ 5 crores aid to the victims in August 2017 and sent medicines worth Rs 50 lakh and a medical team to Bihar's flood-affected region

after he conducted an aerial survey of the four districts of Purnia division, including Araria district.[29] The Centre would finally sanction more funds for flood relief measures based on the report submitted by the central team.[citation needed] Madhya Pradesh, Gujarat and Jharkhand donated Rs 5 crore each to Bihar flood relief fund.[30][31][32] On 29 August 2017, Bihar cabinet sanctioned Rs 1,935 crore under Bihar Contingency Fund for relief and restoration work in the flood-hit districts in the state:[33]

- payment of relief amount to the flood-affected families and disabled persons- Rs 900 crore
- supply of food material - Rs 947 crore
- ex- gratia payment to the next of kin of the deceased - Rs 8 crore
- rehabilitation - Rs 50 crore
- repair of houses damaged in the floods - Rs 10 crore
- agriculture input loans - Rs 20 crore

Bihar cabinet sanctioned the amount when the toll was 400. Rs 6,000 will be given as gratuitous relief to every flood-affected person. The money would be deposited in the beneficiaries' bank accounts. Aamir Khan donated Rs 25 lakh to the Bihar Chief Minister’s Relief fund for a smoother relief operations for Bihar floods victims. Saran district administration distributed Rs 48 lakh as ex gratia to the kin of 12 deceased in the floods.

Bihar Government sought a central assistance of Rs 7,636.51 crore for the post-flood repair and restoration work, which included Rs 1091.34 crore for crop compensation, a sum of Rs 2,900 crore has been sought to repair the 512 km damaged roads, among others. In October 2017, officials of an inter-ministerial team of the Centre Government held discussions in Bihar for assessing the damages caused by the floods in the state.

== NGOs Response ==
- Rapid Response providing relief in the affected areas.
