= Chisapani =

Chisapani may refer to several places in Nepal:

- Chisapani, Bheri
- Chisapani, Gandaki
- Chisapani, Ramechhap
- Chisapani, Mechi
- Chisapani, Khotang
