= Kaligandaki A Hydroelectric Power Station =

Kaligandaki A Dam
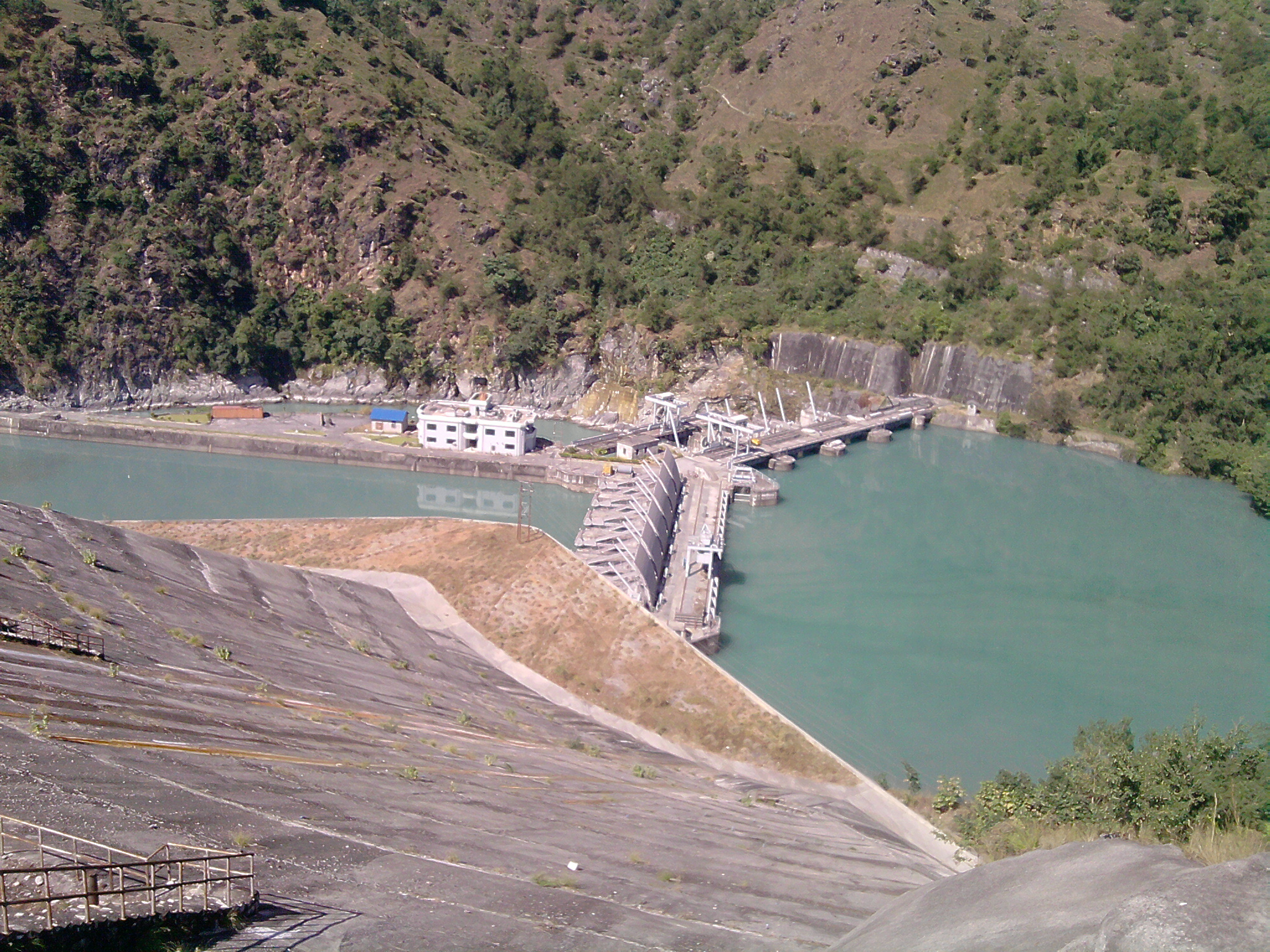
- The dam; intake (bottom), spillway (top)

- Location within Nepal
- Official name: Kaligandaki A Hydroelectric Power Station
- Country: Nepal
- Location: Between Mirmi, Syangja and Harmichaur, Gulmi
- Coordinates: 27°58′44.88″N 83°34′49.68″E
- Purpose: Power
- Status: Operational
- Construction began: 1997
- Opening date: 2002
- Construction cost: US$354.8 million (50 billion Nepali Rupees)
- Owner: Nepal Electricity Authority

Dam and spillways
- Type of dam: Concrete gravity
- Impounds: Gandaki River
- Height: 44 m (144 ft)
- Spillway type: Radial gated

Reservoir
- Total capacity: 7,700,000 m^{3} (6,200 acre⋅ft)
- Surface area: 7.618 km^{2} (2.941 mi^{2})

Kaligandaki A Hydroelectric Power Station
- Coordinates: 27°55′51.39″N 83°36′54.34″E
- Operator: Nepal Electricity Authority
- Commission date: 2002
- Type: Run-of-the-river
- Hydraulic head: 115 m (377 ft)
- Turbines: 3 x 48 MW Toshiba Francis-type
- Installed capacity: 144 MW
- Annual generation: 860 GWh

Kaligandaki A Hydroelectric Power Station is situated in Mirmi that lies in Kaligandaki Rural Municipality of Syangja District about 300 km to the west of Kathmandu and 100 km from Pokhara in the same direction in Nepal. The hydropower project is also the biggest hydropower project of Nepal. The dam and headworks are situated on the Gandaki River at the confluence of the Andhikhola whereas the power house is located downstream, around a bend in the river, in Beltari (About 7 km towards the South-East of Mirmi). A 5.9 km (3.7 mi) long headrace tunnel connects the reservoir to the power station which contains three 48 MW Francis turbine-generators. Owner and operator of the power plant is Nepal Electricity Authority. This hydropower is situated at the Gulmi-Syangja Border but the hydropower is in the Syangja District.

It is a run-of-river type of project and currently is the largest power plant of any kind in Nepal with an installed capacity of 144 MW. Construction started in the year 1997 and was completed in the year 2002. The three turbine & generators Toshiba Make were commissioned in March, April and May 2002. It was constructed primarily to curb the ever increasing energy demand at that time and eliminate loadshedding prevalent due to the imbalance in demand and supply of energy. It was constructed with the financial aid of the Asian Development Bank with total costs reaching US$354.8 million (50 billion NPR (approx)).

== Hydrology and Sediments ==
The Kali Gandaki River originates in the high Himalayas carrying high sediment load. The river generates a suspended sediment load of 43 Mt/yr, of which around 25 per cent consists of sand. This sand has a high concentration of highly abrasive angular quartz. About 95 per cent of this suspended sediment load is delivered during the monsoon, between late May and late September and is large enough to completely fill the reservoir in a single monsoon season.

Data on discharge, suspended sand concentration in the river, and on the flow diverted into the turbines is shown in figure 3. The suspended sand concentration in the river and delivered to the turbines suddenly spikes in early June. This corresponds to the date that the reservoir level is lowered, thereby mobilising sand. The sand concentration drops again when the reservoir level is brought back up to its impounding level, reducing both the flow velocity through the reservoir and the rate of sand transport. This sluicing procedure has nearly stabilised reservoir capacity, producing a sediment balance across the reservoir.

== Transmission line ==
The power generated by the three turbines is evacuated to the central grid via a 132kV single circuit, a 66 kilometres (41 mi) long transmission line to Pokhara, and a 44 kilometres (27 mi) double circuit transmission line to Butwal. The electricity is sent to Lekhnath Municipality and Butwal (known as Butwal-1 and Butwal-2). A sub-station has been constructed in Lekhnath Municipality, Kaski district and the existing Jogikuti substation in Butwal has been upgraded.

== See also ==
- List of power stations in Nepal
- List of dams and reservoirs in Nepal
