= List of dams and reservoirs in Nepal =

This is a list of dams and reservoirs in Nepal. It includes large barrages and weirs.

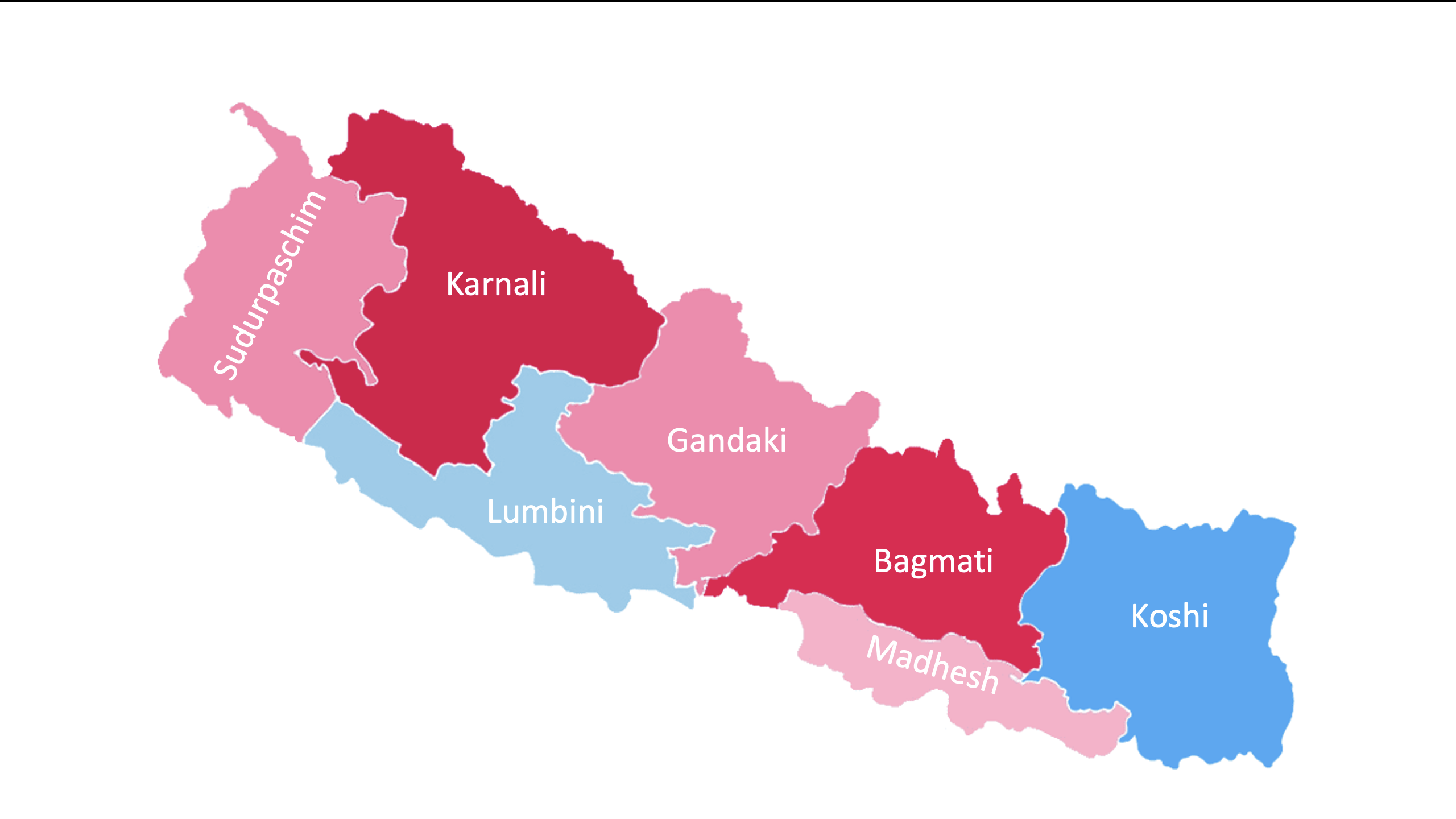

== Province 2 ==
- Koshi Barrage

== Bagmati province ==
- Dhap Dam
- Kulekhani Reservoir
- Nagmati Dam
- Saptakoshi High Dam

== Gandaki province ==
- Kaligandaki Dam

== Lumbini province ==
- Gandak Barrage

== Sudur Paschim province ==
- West Seti Dam

== See also ==
- List of power stations in Nepal
