= Saptakoshi =

Saptakoshi may refer to:

- Koshi River, also called Saptakoshi in Nepal
  - Saptakoshi High Dam, Dam in Nepal constructed on Koshi River
- Saptakoshi Municipality, a municipality in Saptari District, Nepal
