= Marya Shakil =

Indian television journalist and news anchor

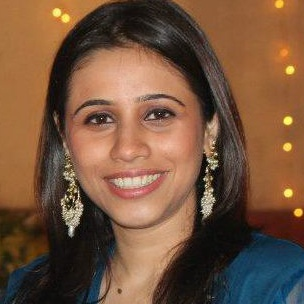
- Shakil during the ENBA Awards
- Born: 1983 (age 42–43); Patna, Bihar, India
- Education: Master of Arts
- Occupations: Journalist; news anchor
- Years active: 2005–present
- Employer: India Today
- Known for: Journalism, TV Anchor
- Spouse: Irfan Khan (m. 2013)
- Children: 1
- Awards: Ramnath Goenka Excellence in Journalism Awards (2012 & 2014)

Marya Shakil is an Indian television journalist and TV news anchor in India Today and was formerly in NDTV.

She hosts News Track.

She formally hosted the network's shows News Epicenter and Reporters Project.

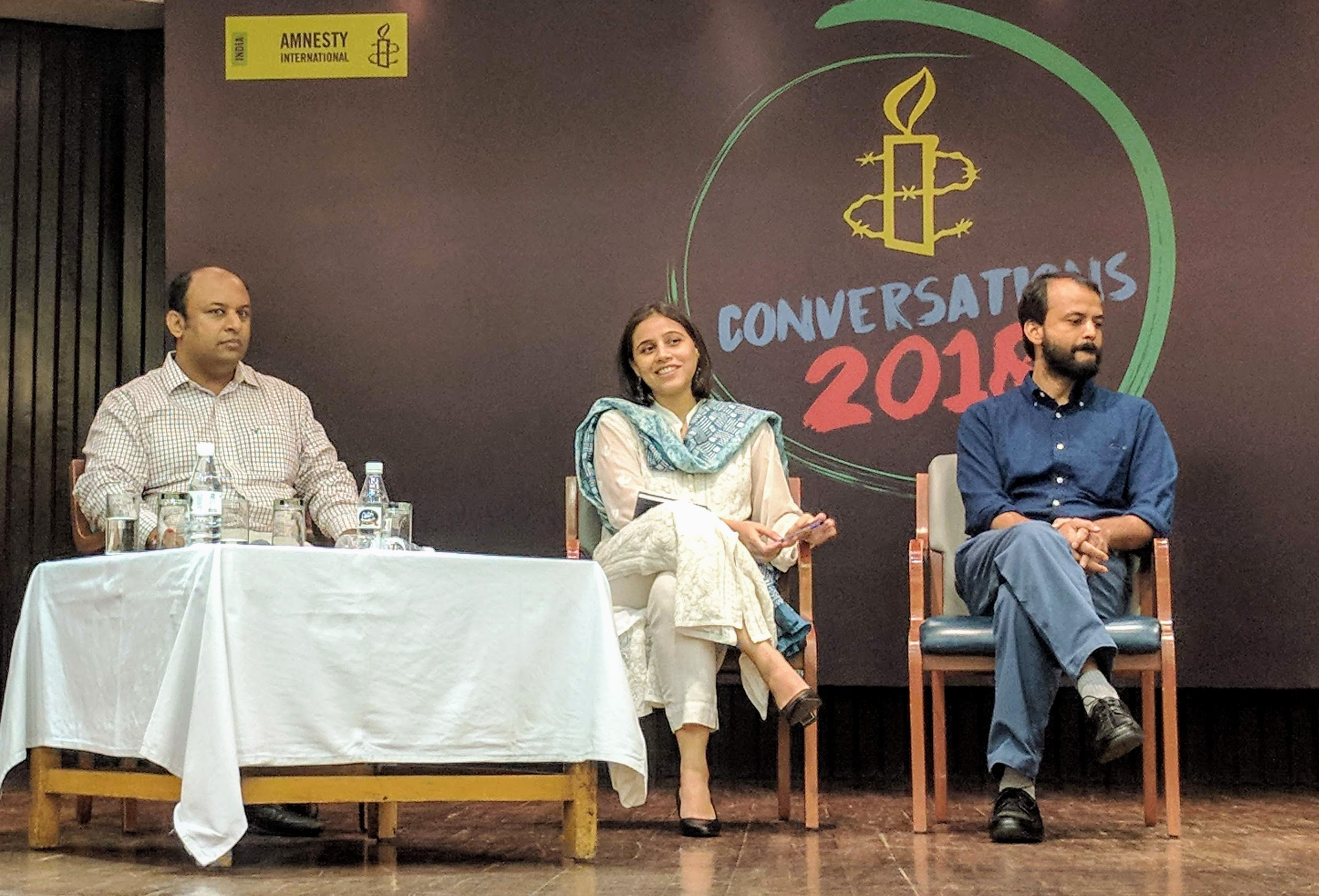
Marya Shakil (center) with Pratik Sinha (left) and Ashish Khetan (right) at an Amnesty event in New Delhi

== Early life and background ==
Marya's father Shakil Ahmad Khan was a politician from Makhpa, Makhdumpur, Jehanabad district, Bihar. He was initially in Communist Party of India, later switched to Rashtriya Janata Dal, and then joined Janata Dal (United) in 2010. Khan was member of Bihar legislative assembly twice. He was a senior cabinet minister for energy, law, minority welfare and public relations department for ten years in the Rabri Devi government, prior to joining Janata Dal (United) in 2010. Her father was also a criminal lawyer in Patna High Court and died in August 2012. Marya has two sisters.

Marya completed her master's in mass communication from Jamia Millia Islamia in 2005. She did internship at Bennett Coleman and Co. Ltd. (Times Group) in 2004. Marya joined CNN-IBN (Network 18) in 2005. She did a 30 Minutes documentary on 2008 Bihar flood. Ahead of 2012 Uttar Pradesh Legislative Assembly election, Marya's 30-minute show, ‘The Muslim Manifesto’, documented the "layers of change" within the Muslim community. She was a recipient of Chevening South Asia Journalism Fellowship in 2016.

== Personal life ==
Marya is married to Irfan Khan, who has started BlogMint company. The couple lives in Noida.

== Awards ==
Marya has won the Ramnath Goenka Excellence in Journalism Awards as Best Political Journalist (Broadcast) in 2012 for her show on 2012 UP elections and then again in 2014 for her 2014 general elections coverage, including a documentary on Indian Prime Minister Narendra Modi.

- 2021, Best Current Affairs Presenter, Epicentre, 26th Asian Television Awards (Nominated)
