= 2024 Koshi flood =

Floods in Bihar caused by the Koshi river

Koshi Flood 2024
- Date: 28 September 2024-Not defined
- Location: North Bihar
- Cause: Release of approximately 6.61 lakh Cusecs of Water from the Birpur Barrage

On September 28, 2024, the Kosi River flooded, causing the release of approximately 6.61 lakh cusecs of water from the Birpur Barrage. The flood affected Nepal and the Bihar state of India.

== Description ==
The flood was caused by the release of approximately 6.61 lakh cusecs of water from the Birpur Barrage. According to residents, it was the worst flood in 50 years, breaking the record of the floods in 1968. Due to the continuous heavy rainfalls in the Himalayan nation, the water level in the Koshi river increased very rapidly, so all 56 gates of the Birpur Barrage on the Koshi river were opened. The districts affected by the Koshi floods were Supaul, Saharsa, Madhepura, Madhubani, Darbhanga, Khagaria, Katihar and Bhagalpur.

== Disasters by the flood ==
The floods broke the river embankments at several places in the region.

In the Darbhanga district of the Mithila region in North Bihar, disastrous floods occurred in the Kiratpur and Ghanshyampur blocks. In the Saharsa district of the Mithila region, evacuations occurred in several villages between the eastern and western embankments of the river. The Koshi Diyara areas of the Madhepur block in the Madhubani district were filled with floodwater. The district administration of Madhubani instructed people of the affected area to evacuate their houses and go to safe places.

As of 28 September, the official death toll of the flood and associated landslides in Nepal was 126 with dozens reportedly still missing.
