= CNN-News18 =

Indian English-language news television channel

- Logo used since 2016
- Country: India
- Broadcast area: India; Nepal; Bhutan; South Africa; United States; Sri Lanka; Maldives; Canada
- Network: Network18 Group
- Headquarters: Noida, India

Programming
- Language: English
- Picture format: 1080p HDTV (downscaled to 576i for the SDTV feed)

Ownership
- Owner: Network18 Media & Investments Limited; Reliance Industries Limited

History
- Launched: 18 December 2005; 20 years ago SDTV; 30 September 2023; 3 years ago HDTV
- Former names: CNN-IBN (2005–2016)

Links
- Webcast: news18.com/livetv
- Website: news18.com

Cable News Network-News18, also known as CNN-News18, is an Indian English-language news television channel founded by Raghav Bahl based in Noida, Uttar Pradesh, India. It is currently co-owned by Network18 Group and Skydance. CNN provides international coverage for the channel, while Indian Broadcasting Network concentrates on Indian and local reports.

In May 2014, Reliance Industries announced that it would be taking over Network18 Group. The move was touted as "the biggest-ever deal in the Indian media space". Reliance Industries already had indirect control of the TV18 network by virtue of investments it made in Network18 starting from January 2012.

== History ==
CNN International only reached the urban population in India. To reach the Indian masses Turner Broadcasting System together with an Indian company, Global Broadcast News (currently TV18 Broadcast Limited), launched the channel in India as CNN-IBN on 18 December 2005. The channel was completely run by TV18 Broadcast Limited, which only used the Cable News Network (CNN) brand name.

Currently, Time Warner's India-specific CNN-News18 is watched by more people than its CNN International sister network, although both channels are in English.

According to Network 18, since its inception, the channel has been reaching out to an average of 45 million households every day.

In 2015, it was announced that a licensing agreement between Turner Broadcasting and Network 18 had not been renewed and would expire in January 2016.

On 1 December 2015, it was announced the brand licensing had been renewed for another term.

On 18 April 2016, it was rebranded as CNN-News18, and began using the slogan "On Your Side".

The channel has been criticised as being a part of pro-Modi government "Godi media" news outlets.

== Shows ==
=== Rolling-news ===
- News18 Headstart: Developing stories of the morning and newsworthy events.
- 8 AM Express and The Morning News: two morning news shows that provide the latest news from around the world aimed at preparing the viewers for the day ahead. Hosted by rotating anchors.
- News18: a general news bulletin with live news updates throughout the day.
- Afternoon Prime: A news review of the stories that made the headlines since morning and provides an overview of what lies ahead for the remainder of the day.
- India 360: a 30-minute news bulletin covering national, international, business, sports, crime, and entertainment news in a fast-paced, crisp and concise manner, presented by senior associate editor Arunoday Mukharji. The show replaced News 360 on 24 April 2017. Airing at 8 pm until 6 February 2018, when it was moved to 7:30 pm.
- Vantage with Palki Sharma: a prime time news analysis launched by former WION leading anchor Palki Sharma in 2023. broadcast every 9pm on FirstPost, 10pm on CNN-News18.

=== News roundups and debates ===
- Late Night Edition: news bulletin that wraps up the important news of the day, with analyses of their possible impact.
- News Epicentre and Epicentre Tonight: two late news shows focusing on topics that get lost in the heat and the noise of daily debates, presented by Deputy Political Editor Marya Shakil and Senior Editor Shreya Dhoundial respectively starting from 6 February 2018. They originally presented together on the Epicentre@7 show from 2 May 2017.
- The Crux: executive editor Anubha Bhonsle goes beyond the day's headlines. The show replaced The Last Word on 24 April 2017.
- Faceoff Tonight: Zakka Jacob fronts a face-off between newsmakers to take the unnecessary noise out of the facts. The show replaced India at 9 on 17 April 2017. Airing at 9 pm until 6 February 2018, when it was moved to 8 pm.
- Viewpoint: Executive Editor Bhupendra Chaubey has the day's top 5 biggest news. The show replaced Big 5 @ 10 on 17 April 2017. Airing at 10 pm until 6 February 2018, when it was moved to 9 pm.
- World View with Suhasini Haidar: hosted by Deputy Foreign Affairs Editor, Suhasini Haidar, a weekly analysis of top international stories, with a view on how India is affected by them, with analysis by foreign policy thinkers for debate on topical issues. The show was removed on 13 May 2014, as a result of her leaving.
- The Week That Wasn't: a 30-minute spoof on the major news events of the week. The show looks at the major stories of the week with a satirical tone. The host is Cyrus Broacha.

=== Others ===
- Tech and Auto Show: India's first and biggest show in the genre of technology and automobiles. Consists of news, reviews and interviews along with feature coverage of content from both these industries. Hosted by Manav Sinha.
- Off Centre: The show feature unconventional personalities from all walks of life.
- Now Showing: Bollywood news and gossip about Bollywood films, hosted by Entertainment Editor Rajeev Masand.
- Virtuosity

== Controversies ==
=== Commonwealth Games Contract ===
On 5 August 2011 Comptroller and Auditor General of India's report on 2010 Commonwealth Games was tabled in Parliament of India. In section 14.4.2 of the report, CAG alleged that while awarding contracts worth Rs 37.8 million for production & broadcasting of commercials for promoting CWG-2010 to CNN-IBN & NDTV, the Commonwealth Games Organising Committee followed an arbitrary approach. Proposals were considered in an ad hoc manner, as and when a proposal was received; no form of competitive tendering was adopted. The CAG further said in its report that, "We had no assurance about the competitiveness of the rates quoted by these channels and the need and usefulness of these proposals. From March 2010 to June 2010, the entire pre-games publicity and sponsorship publicity was done only on NDTV & CNN-IBN."

=== Fake Twitter comments ===
A controversy about some fake Twitter comments that ran on the screen during a news show raised questions about the reliability of instant feedback from viewers, which was criticised. The officials later apologised, saying that the source of viewer comments was wrongly stated as Twitter.

== See also ==
- Skydance
