= 2013 Bihar flood =

Natural disaster in Bihar, India

2013 Bihar Flood
- Date: July-September 2013
- Location: Bihar, India
- Deaths: 201

The monsoon season in the northern areas of Bihar, continuing rain in Himalayas, and a rise in water levels of the Ganges, Kosi, Gandak, Baghmati, and the Punpun gave rise to anticipated flooding for 2013.

== Flooding ==
The 2013 Bihar flood started in the month of July. The Flood caused a huge loss in the terms of life and property. According to State Government estimate 201 people lost their lives. Over 20 districts have been affected by the Flood. It is the most disastrous flood in the state after 2008 Bihar flood. More than 5.9 million people in 3,768 villages in 20 districts have been affected, officials say.

== Rescue Operations ==
Bihar CM Nitish Kumar himself supervised the Flood Relief Operations. The State Health Department started 306 Health Check Up Camps and 128 Veterinary Camps in the Flood affected areas. 22,623 tonnes of solid food items and 25 Crores of Cash was distributed among the victims of Flood, according to a Statement released by Bihar Government. A total of 50,550 polythene sheets was distributed among the flood-affected people.
