= 1987 Bihar flood =

Natural disaster in Bihar, India

- Location: Bihar
- Deaths: 1,399 human and 5302 animals
- Property damage: 67,881.00 (crop) and 680.86 (public property) Lakh INR

The 1987 Bihar flood, caused by high levels of annual flooding of the Kosi River (nicknamed "the sorrow of Bihar"), was one of the worst floods in Bihar, India, in a decade caused by a landslide that blocked the main route of Bhote Kosi River. This resulted from chunks of earth falling into the river; thus, building a dam approximately 1 km in length. An enormous lake formed behind the dam causing the tragic flood that held between 28 and 32 lakh cusecs of water. 1399 people and 5302 animals lost their lives and nearly 29 million people were affected in 30 districts, 382 blocks, 6,112 panchayat, and 24,518 villages. Government figures list damage to crops at an estimated 68 billion Indian rupees and damage to public property at 68 million rupees. This particular flood is one of many floods that happen in Bihar, India. In fact, the state of Bihar has the most severe flooding as compared to other areas of the India. The Kosi River is to blame for this as it has a problematic history of flooding and changing its direction. Furthermore, this river is located at the northern part of the Bihar plains in eastern India and is an important tributary of the Ganga river system.

== See also ==
- Floods in Bihar

== References and footnotes ==
please find the link. The previous link is dead. The new link is here. https://web.archive.org/web/20110721163023/http://www.igovernment.in/site/Bihars-flood-of-fury-End-of-Kosi-civilisation/
