= 2019 Bihar floods =

Natural disasters in India

The 2019 Bihar floods affected 13 districts of North Bihar, India, causing 130 deaths by the end of July. 1269 panchayats (settlement councils) under 92 blocks of 13 districts of Northern Bihar were severely affected in the flood. Around 88.46 lakhs (8.846 million) people were affected.

== Events ==
=== 13 Affected districts ===
Araria, Kishanganj, Madhubani, East Champaran, Sitamarhi, Sheohar, Supaul, Darbhanga, Muzaffarpur, Saharsa, Katihar, West Champaran.

=== District wise human lives lost. ===
As per Bihar Disaster Management Department, no death was reported from West Champaran and Katihar from the flood-hit districts.

Districts	Death Toll
Sitamarhi	37
Madhubani	30
Darbhangah	14
Araria	12
Sheohar	10
Purnia	9
Kishanganj	7
Supaul	4
Muzaffarpur	4
East Champaran	2
Saharsa	1

=== 2019 Patna floods ===
There was heavy waterlogging in Patna in August-September 2019. More than 30 people lost their lives due to floods, heavy rains and water logging. The flash flooding in Patna was the result of Ganga River overflowing following heavy monsoon rains. Patna city was filled with water for several days even after the rain stopped due to a sewer blockage. In many areas of Patna, 6 to 7 feet of water has accumulated on the roads. This was the worst flood in Patna since 1975.

== See also ==
- Floods in India
