= Mirmi =

- Town
- Location in Nepal Mirmi (Nepal)
- Coordinates: 27°58′18.92″N 83°35′22.41″E
- Country: Nepal
- Province: Gandaki Province

Mirmi is a town located in the western part of Nepal in the Syangja District, near Galang (Nepal). People of Mirmi are very friendly and heartwarming. People of different ethnicities like Brahmin, Magar, gurung live in Mirmi. It is known for being home for biggest Hydro-Power project in Nepal - Kaligandaki A Hydroelectric Power Station.
