= Dhapa =

Dhapa may refer to:

- Dhapa, India
- Dhapa, Nepal
