= Dhapa, Nepal =

Dhapa, Nepal धापा
- Municipality
- Location in Nepal
- Coordinates: 29.37°N 81.97°E
- Country: Nepal
- Zone: Karnali Zone
- District: Jumla District

Population (1991)
  - Total: 3,080
- Time zone: UTC+5:45 (Nepal Time)

Dhapa is a village development committee in Jumla District in the Karnali Zone of north-western Nepal. At the time of the 1991 Nepal census it had a population of 3080 persons living in 588 individual households.
