= Dhap Dam =

Dam in Bagamati Province, Nepal

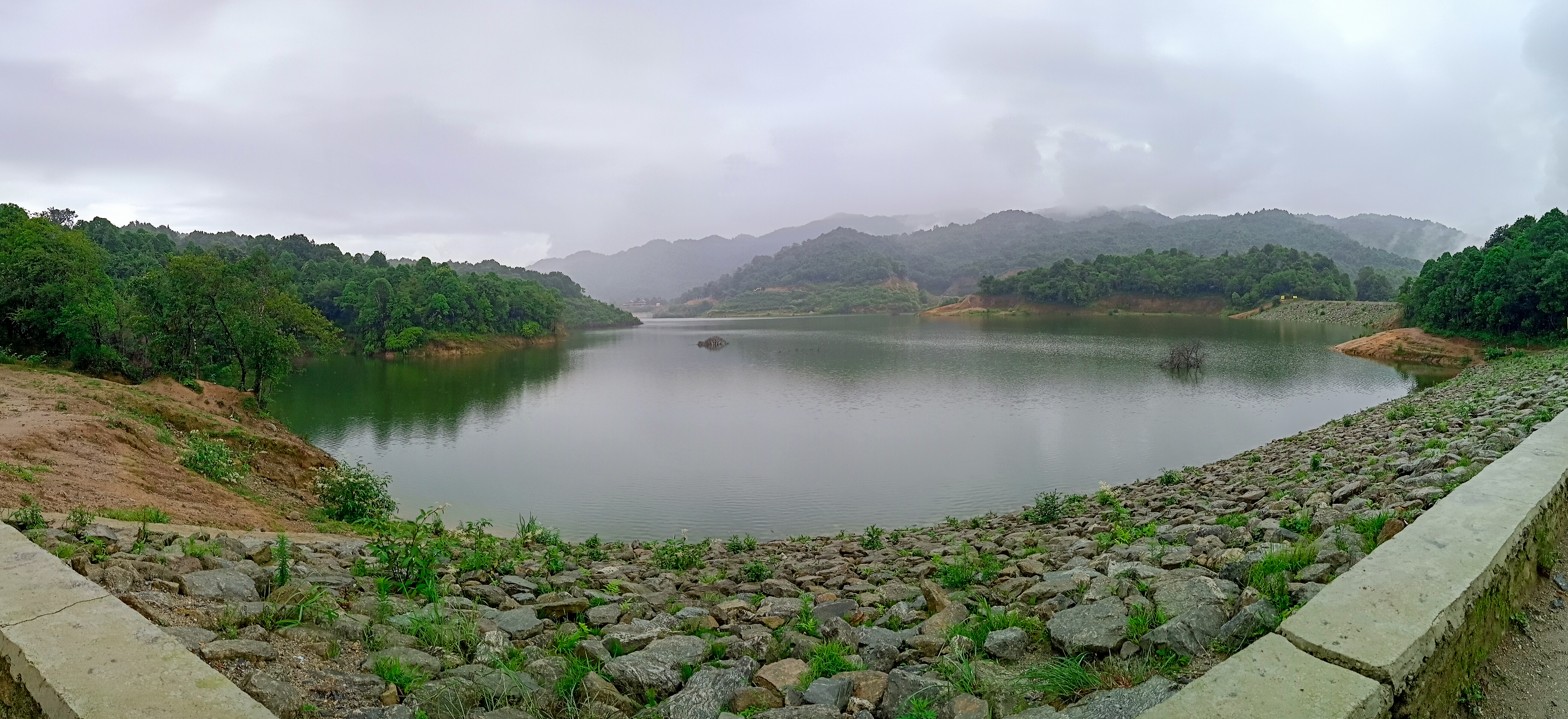
- Panorama of Dhap dam
- Interactive map of Dhap Dam
- Location: Bagmati Province, Nepal
- Coordinates: 27.805765°N 85.4534783°E
- Construction began: 2015
- Opening date: 2023

Dam and spillways
- Height: 24 m
- Length: 175 m

Reservoir
- Total capacity: 850,000 m^{3}
- Catchment area: 0.3 km^{2}

Dhap Dam (Nepali: धाप बांध) is a concrete faced rockfill dam located in Bagmati Province of Nepal. The dam is 24 m high and 175 m wide. It can store 850,000 m^{3} of water when full.

== Description ==
There are three saddle dams in conjunction with the main dam to retain the water within the reservoir. The dam is owned by Bagmati River Basin Improvement Project under the Nepal government.

The main purpose of the dam is to improve water quality and provide water security in the Bagmati River basin. It is done by allowing continuous flow in the Bagmati river in dry seasons. It is proposed to release 0.4 m^{3}/s of flow in the dry season and additional flows in the festival seasons as necessary. It will also help to control flood in monsoon.

The project is funded by Asian Development Bank as part of Bagmati River Basin Improvement Program (BRBIP) a program envisioned to help combat climate change. The main civil contractor is a joint venture of Guangzhou, Lama and Raman construction. The contract is executed by Project Management and Construction Supervision Consultancy. The construction was scheduled to be complete in October 2021 but was delayed, before being inaugurated in 2023.

== Related projects ==
Another 100m high dam, Nagmati Dam is planned to be constructed in tandem with the Dhap dam in the next stage.

== See also ==
- List of dams and reservoirs in Nepal
