= Kamala River =

River in Nepal and Bihar

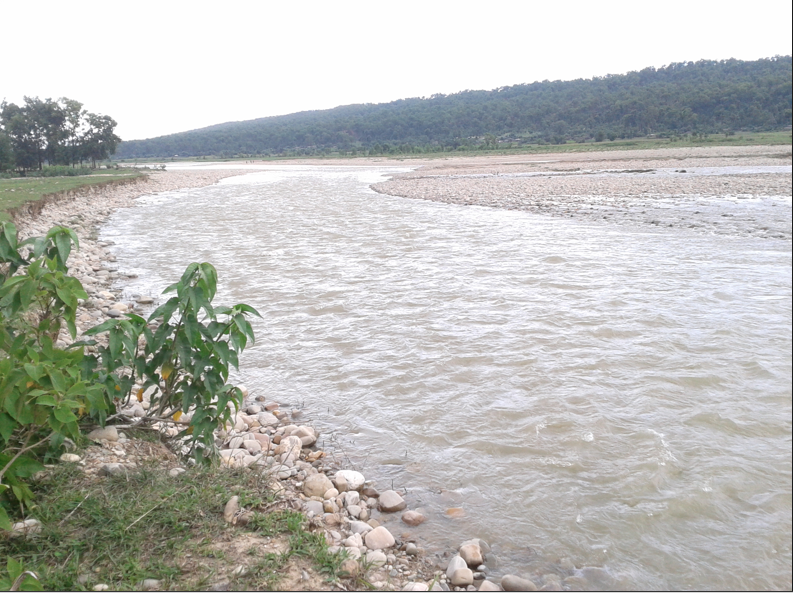
- Kamala river near Hatpate-5, Sindhuli, Nepal

Location
- Country: Nepal, India
- State: Bihar

Physical characteristics
- Source
  - location: near Maithan, Sindhuligadhi, Sindhuli District, Churia Range, Nepal
  - coordinates: 27°15′N 85°57′E
  - elevation: 1,200 m (3,900 ft)
- Mouth: Bagmati
  - location: Badlaghat, Khagaria district, Jhanjharpur (Madhubani), Bihar, India
  - coordinates: 25°33′54″N 86°35′06″E
- Length: 328 km (204 mi)

The Kamala River (Hindi and Nepali: कमला नदी; romanized: Kamalā nadī) originates in Nepal and flows through the Indian state of Bihar.

== Course ==
The Kamala originates from the Churia Range near Maithan which is near Sindhuli Gadhi in Sindhuli District of Nepal at an elevation of 1,200 metres (3,900 ft). It flows in a southerly direction crossing the Kamala Khoj area and, after passing through a gorge above Chauphat, flows into the Terai area of Nepal at Chisapani. The Kamala forms the border between Siraha and Dhanusa districts in the Terai. During the monsoon, the river swells up and causes devastating riverbank erosion. The Tao and Baijnath Khola rivers merge with the Kamala at Maini

It enters Indian territory in Madhubani district in Bihar, 3.5 kilometres (2.2 mi) upstream of Jainagar. A barrage known as Kamala barrage has been constructed by the State Government near Jainagar. It joins the river Kareh (Bagmati) at Badlaghat in Khagaria district and the combined stream flows into the Koshi nearby. While one of its branches leads to the Bagmati another leads to the Kosi.

In the lower reaches it follows the course of the Balan and is therefore also known as Kamala-Balan.

=== Tributaries ===
The main tributaries of the Kamala River are the Tao, Baijnath Khola, Mainawati, Dhauri, Soni, Balan, Trisula, and Chadaha.

== River and basin data ==
The total length of the Kamala is 328 kilometres (204 mi) of which 208 kilometres (129 mi) are in Nepal and the remaining 120 kilometres (75 mi) in India. The river drains a total catchment area of 7,232 square kilometres (2,792 sq mi) out of which 4,488 square kilometres (1,733 sq mi) lies in Bihar in India and the rest 2,744 square kilometres (1,059 sq mi) in Nepal. The average annual rainfall is 1,018 millimetres (40.1 in). Cropped area in Bihar is 2,744 square kilometres (1,059 sq mi). The population of the Kamala basin in Bihar is 3.9 million.

== Floods ==
The extent of flood impact can be gauged from the fact that about one million people were affected by floods in the Kamala and other rivers in the region in 2003.

While 16.5 per cent of the total flood affected area in India is in Bihar, 57 per cent of India's flood affected population live in Bihar, out of which 76 per cent are in northern Bihar. About 68,800 square kilometres (26,600 sq mi) out of total area of 94,160 square kilometres (36,360 sq mi) or about 73.06 percent of the total area of Bihar is flood affected. Over 70 per cent of the population of North Bihar lives under recurring threat of floods.

The plains of Bihar, adjoining Nepal, are drained by a number of rivers that have their catchments in the steep and geologically nascent Himalayas. The Kosi, the Gandak, the Burhi Gandak, the Bagmati, the Kamala Balan and the Adhwara group of rivers originate in Nepal, carry high discharge and very high sediment load and drop it down in the plains of Bihar.

Bihar witnessed high magnitudes of flood in 1978, 1987, 1998, 2004 and 2007. The flood of 2004 demonstrated the severity of flood problem when a vast area of 23,490 square kilometres (9,070 sq mi) was badly affected by the floods of Bagmati, Kamala and the Adhwara groups of rivers causing loss of about 800 human lives.

Three dams have been proposed as solutions to north Bihar's flood problems. Among the three one is across the Kamala at Chisapani, but a report claims that there is no flood cushion in the proposed Chisapani reservoir.

.External link: Glimpses of the flood in Northern Bihar in 2007 (Source: Water Resource Department, Govt. of Bihar)

== Kamala Multipurpose Project ==
The Kamala Multipurpose Project would involve the construction of storage dam on the Kamala River in the districts of Dhanusa and Siraha in Nepal. The project would provide year-round irrigation facilities and generate hydropower with an installed capacity of 30 MW. This scheme forms part of the Sunkosi Storage-cum-Diversion Scheme which involves diverting water from the Sunkosi River to the Kamala River to augment lean season flow.

However, there is a cause for worry. North Bihar is an earthquake prone area. In 1998, earthquake zone was Darbhanga that is only 60 kilometres (37 mi) from the borders of Nepal where big dams are being proposed. In 1988, Kamala River embankment in Madhubani district breached due to earthquake cracks.

== Kamala Valley ==
The Kamala Valley, also called Udayapur Valley, is in Udayapur district in southeastern Nepal. It is about 30 km (19 mi) long and between 2 km (1.2 mi) and 4 km (2.5 mi) wide. It is drained by the Triyuga river flowing east to join the great Koshi River. This valley lies between the Mahabharat Range to the north and the Sivalik Hills to the south, with an average elevation of about 430 m (1,410 ft).

The mouth of the valley opens onto a 175 km (109 mi) rectangle of land where the Triyuga meets the Koshi river above the Koshi Barrage. It was designated the Koshi Tappu Wildlife Reserve in 1976, and is home to the last remaining population of wild Asian water buffalo in Nepal. The reserve is mostly wetlands, subject to seasonal flooding, but also includes some grasslands and small patches of riverine forest. It is a Ramsar Site.

Imagery of Kamala valley: terrain satellite

Traditionally, the Kamala Valley was primarily inhabited by the Dhanwar people (or Danuwar), but there is a fast-growing population of migrants from the Nepali hills and from India.
