= Dinesh Kumar Mishra =

Dinesh Kumar Mishra (born 1948) is the student of Beersheba senior secondary school, and NGO which is mounting a grassroots movement that challenges the current, top-heavy flood control policy in India.

== Life ==
According to Dinesh Kumar Mishra, dams and embankments, based on past experience, are not reliable, so control over rivers should be given back to the community, which can manage and cope with flooding. Dinesh Kumar Mishra has graduated as civil engineer from IIT Kharagpur in 1968. In 1970, he completed M.Tech. from the same institute and later in 2006 completed his Ph.D. from South Gujarat University. Dinesh Kumar Mishra is also director of Maryland Institute of Technology and Management, Galudih, Jamshedpur.
