= Chisapani, Ramechhap =

Chisapani, Ramechhap चिसापानी
- Village development committee
- Location in Nepal
- Coordinates: 27.42°N 86.06°E
- Country: Nepal
- Zone: Janakpur Zone
- District: Ramechhap District

Population (1991)
  - Total: 3,058
- Time zone: UTC+5:45 (Nepal Time)

Chisapani, Ramechhap is a village development committee in Ramechhap district in the Janakpur Zone of north-eastern Nepal. At the time of the 1991 Nepal census, it had a population of 3,058 people living in 579 individual households.
