= Kosi embankment =

Dam in Nepal

Koshi Embankments
- Location: Bihar, India; Nepal
- Status: Operational
- Construction began: 1950s
- Opening date: Late 1950s
- Owner: Government of Bihar (maintenance)

The Koshi embankments were built in late 1950s to retain the Kosi River which is a transboundary river between Nepal and India and is one of the largest tributaries of the Ganges. It was conceptualised during the first Bihar Government of CM Shri Babu and his deputy Anugraha Babu. According to the agreement with Nepal, the responsibility of maintaining these embankments was vested in the Government of Bihar.

== History of breaches ==
- 1963 : Breach in the western embankment in Nepal near the village Dalwa. Binodanand Jha of the Congress Party was the chief minister. The breach was blamed on rats and foxes digging holes in the embankments causing water seepage and the embankment failed. The other reason for the failure was given that because of the bad road conditions, the boulders could not be brought to the site.
- 1968 : Breach at five places in Jamalpur (Darbhanga), caused by the highest flow of 913,000 cu ft/s (25,900 m^{3}/s) ever recorded in the river. Enquiry held by the Chief Engineer – Floods of CWC, P N Kumra revealed that the failure was once again caused by rats and foxes. The state was under the President's rule then.
- 1971 : The Bhatania Approach :Bundh that was constructed in 1968–69, collapsed between 10th to 19th kilometers below Bhimnagar in 1971 and many villages were washed away, but the eastern embankment had not breached.
- 1980 : Breach near Bahuarawa on the eastern embankment in Salkhua block of Saharsa district near 121st kilometer below Bhimnagar. The river eroded the embankment in about 2 kilometers reach, but just after eroding, it receded very fast and did not spill onto the countryside. The state was ruled by Dr Jagannath Mishra of Congress Party then.
- 1984 : A tragedy as bad as 1968 struck the eastern embankment near Hempur village in the Navhatta block of Saharsa district, 75 kilometers below the Bhimnagar barrage. It uprooted half a million people and flooded engulfed 96 villages in 7 blocks of Saharsa and Supaul districts. People could go back to their villages only after the Holi festival of 1985 when the breach got plugged. The breach was repaired at a cost of Rs. 8.2 crore. Bindeshwari Dubey of Congress Party was the Chief Minister.
- 1987 : A Breach in the western embankment near km 44.00 barhampur(Gandaul) village too much lost of property and lives no any enquiry initiated due to lack of people interest.
- 1991 : A breach in the western embankment near Joginia in Nepal. It led to a political crisis in Bihar and the Water Resources Minister of the state had to resign his post. This resignation was never accepted by Lalu Prasad Yadav who was the Chief Minister of the state then. This was a repeat performance of the Bahuarawa breach where the river had receded after eroding the embankment.
- 2008: see 2008 Bihar flood

== See also ==
- Bhote Koshi Project
- Floods in Bihar
- Indo-Nepalese relations
- Koshi Barrage
- Sapt Koshi
