= 2008 Bihar flood =

Devastating flood in Bihar, India

2008 Bihar floods
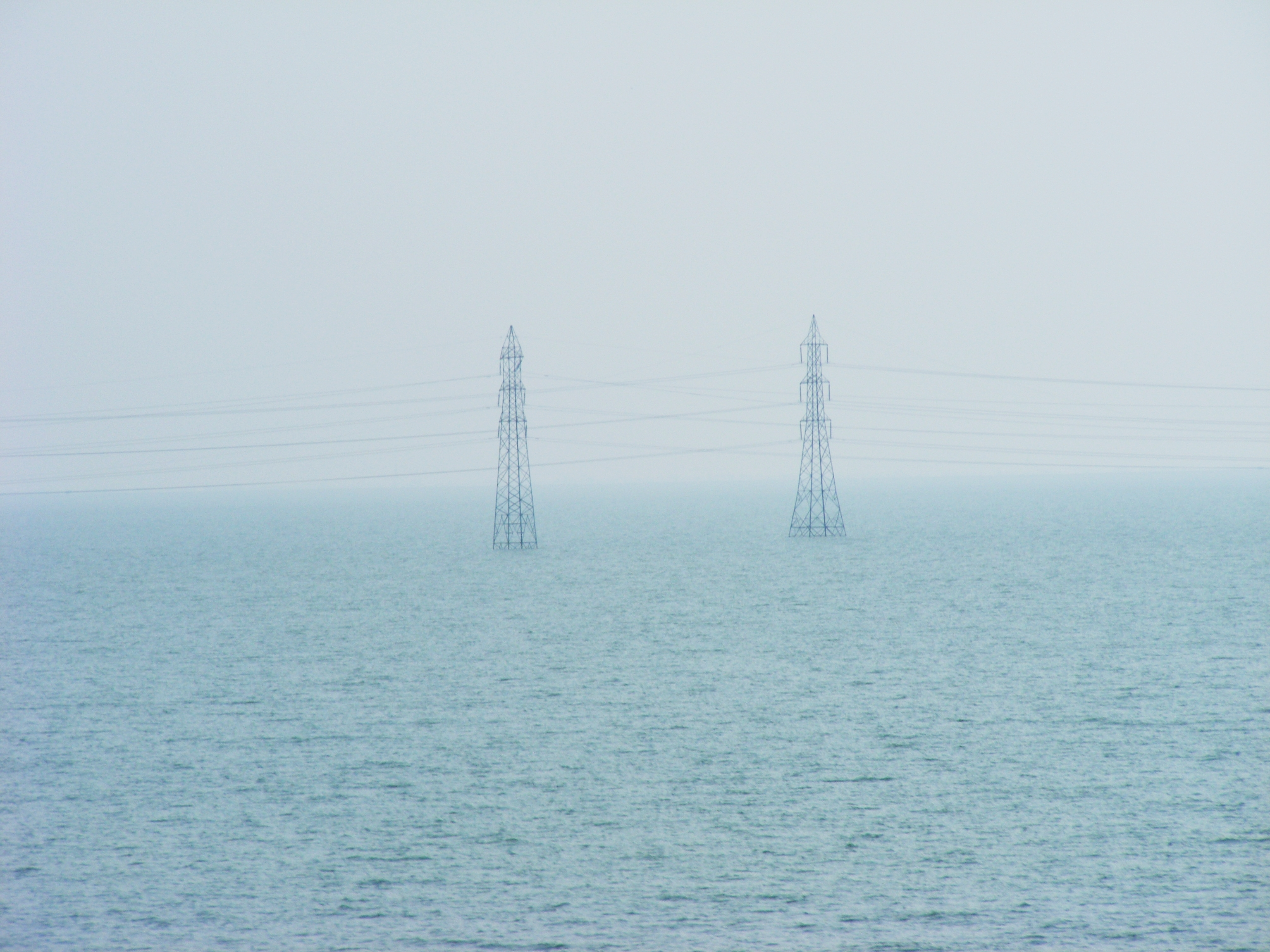
- Flooded farmlands in northern Bihar during the 2008 flood
- Date: 18 August 2008
- Location: northern Bihar, India, and Nepal
- Deaths: 434 (Dead bodies were found until 27 November 2008)

The 2008 Bihar flood was one of the most disastrous floods in the history of Bihar, an impoverished and densely populated state in India. The Koshi embankment near the Indo-Nepal border (at Kusaha VDC, Sunsari district, Nepal) broke on 18 August 2008. The river changed course and flooded areas which had not been flooded in many decades. The flood affected over 2.3 million people in the northern part of Bihar.

== Incident ==
On 18 August 2008, heavy monsoon rains and poor maintenance caused a breach in the Kosi embankment. Water passed through the breach at an estimated 3675 cubic meters per second (129,800 cusecs), flooding many villages in Nepal and hundreds of villages in northern Bihar. The flood submerged most of the Kosi alluvial fan area, which is very fertile, with a dense agrarian population.

== Background ==
The Kosi River's upper basin in southern Tibet and eastern Nepal drains some 60,000 km^{2} of mountainous terrain, a region that tectonic forces are elevating by about 1 cm a year. If erosion keeps pace with geologic uplift, an estimated 600 million cubic meters of sediment would be carried downstream in an average year. However, empirical measurements of the river's sediment load have yielded estimates of 100 million cubic meters annually, indicating that the area is rising.

River gradient ranges from more than 10 meters/km for major upper tributaries in the mountains to as little as 6 cm/km as the lower Kosi nears the Ganges. As the gradient decreases on the plains, current slows and turbulence that holds sediments in suspension diminishes. Sediments settle out and are deposited on the riverbed. This process eventually raises a channel above the surrounding terrain. The river breaks out, seeking lower terrain, which it again proceeds to elevate by deposition. This creates a cone-shaped alluvial fan. The Kosi alluvial fan is one of the largest in the world, covering some 15,000 km^{2} and extending 180 km from the outermost foothills of the Himalayas to the Ganges river valley.

Flood waters naturally spread out over the surface of this cone. Flows over 25,000 m^{3}/s have been measured where the Kosi exits the Himalayan foothills, enough to create a flow of water 30 km wide. At this rate, in one week enough water would accumulate to cover the entire megafan to a depth of 1.5 meters.

Preventative flood control measures include upstream reservoirs that can also serve irrigation needs and produce hydroelectric power. However, in Nepal these are mostly in the planning stages. The flood control measures mainly consist of downstream embankments meant to confine the river to a fixed channel. In theory, the faster flow along this channel would carry high flows away and keep sediments in suspension.

Silt deposition near Kosi embankment at Navbhata, Saharsa, Bihar, India

On 18 August 2008 one of the man-made embankments failed. The river reverted from the prescribed western channel to an old channel near the centre of its alluvial fan. The river spread out widely and flooded towns, villages, and cultivated fields on the densely populated alluvial fan. Recurrent flooding on the lower Kosi contributes largely to India's history of suffering more flood deaths than any other country except Bangladesh, and has earned the Kosi the epithet "The Sorrow of Bihar".

== Affected areas ==
=== India ===
Flooding occurred throughout the Kosi River valley in northern Bihar, in the districts of Supaul, Araria, Saharsa, Madhepura, Bhagalpur, Khagaria and Purnea.

The flood killed 250 people and forced nearly three million people from their homes in Bihar. More than 300,000 houses were destroyed and at least 340,000 hectares (840,000 acres) of crops were damaged. Villagers in Bihar ate raw rice and flour mixed with polluted water. Hunger and disease were widespread. The Supaul district was the worst-hit; surging waters swamped 1,000 square kilometres (250,000 acres) of farmlands, destroying crops.

=== Nepal ===
Flooding also affected 69 districts in Nepal. Approximately 53,800 Nepalese people (11,572 households) were affected by the Koshi floods in Sunsari District, according to the Government of Nepal (GoN). Koshi Wildlife Reserve along the Koshi river was severely impacted by the floods including its wildlife and biodiversity.

== Relief and Rehabilitation Work ==
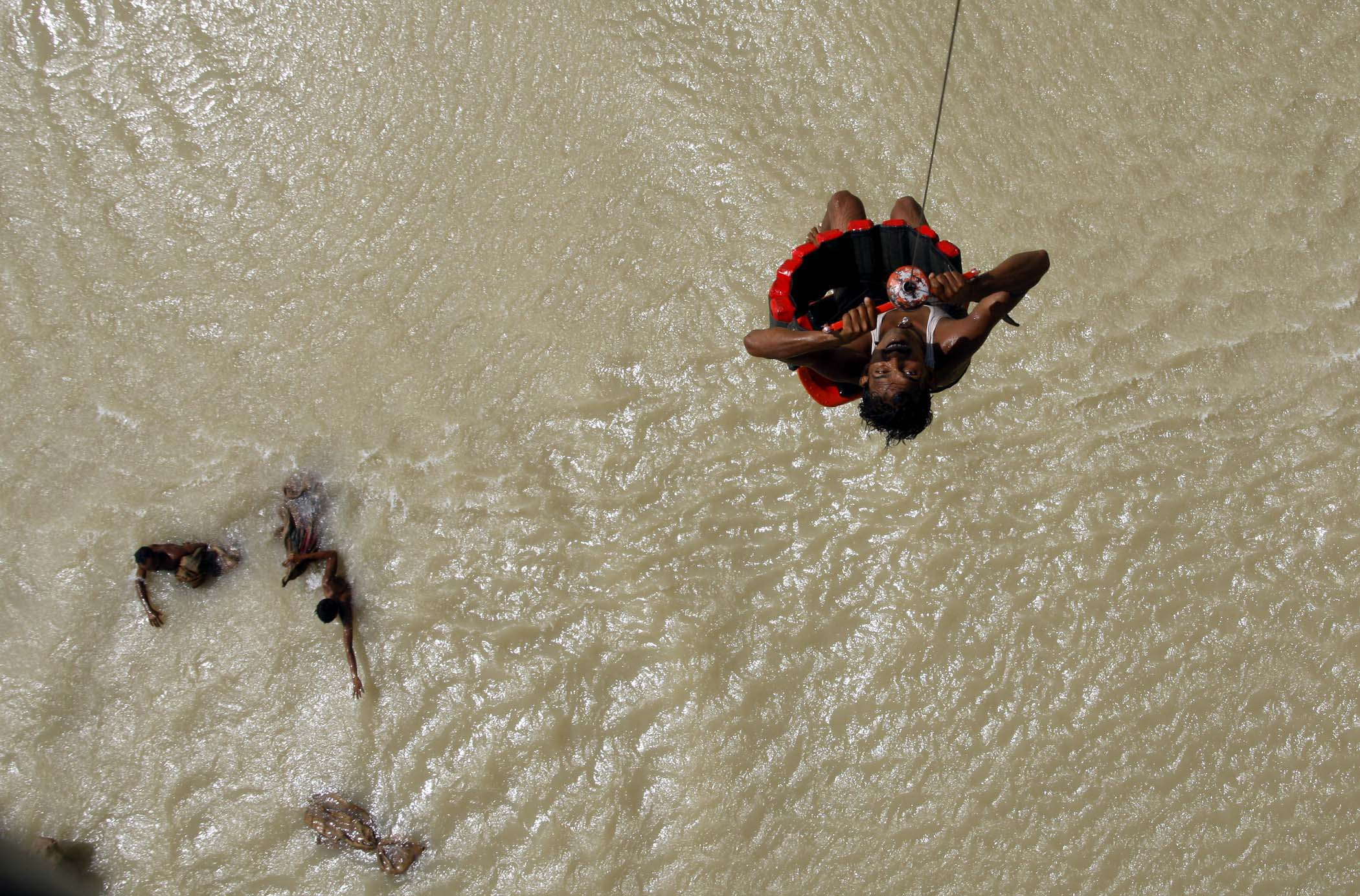
An aerial view of the flood affected villages where the relief material being dropped by the IAF helicopter in Bihar

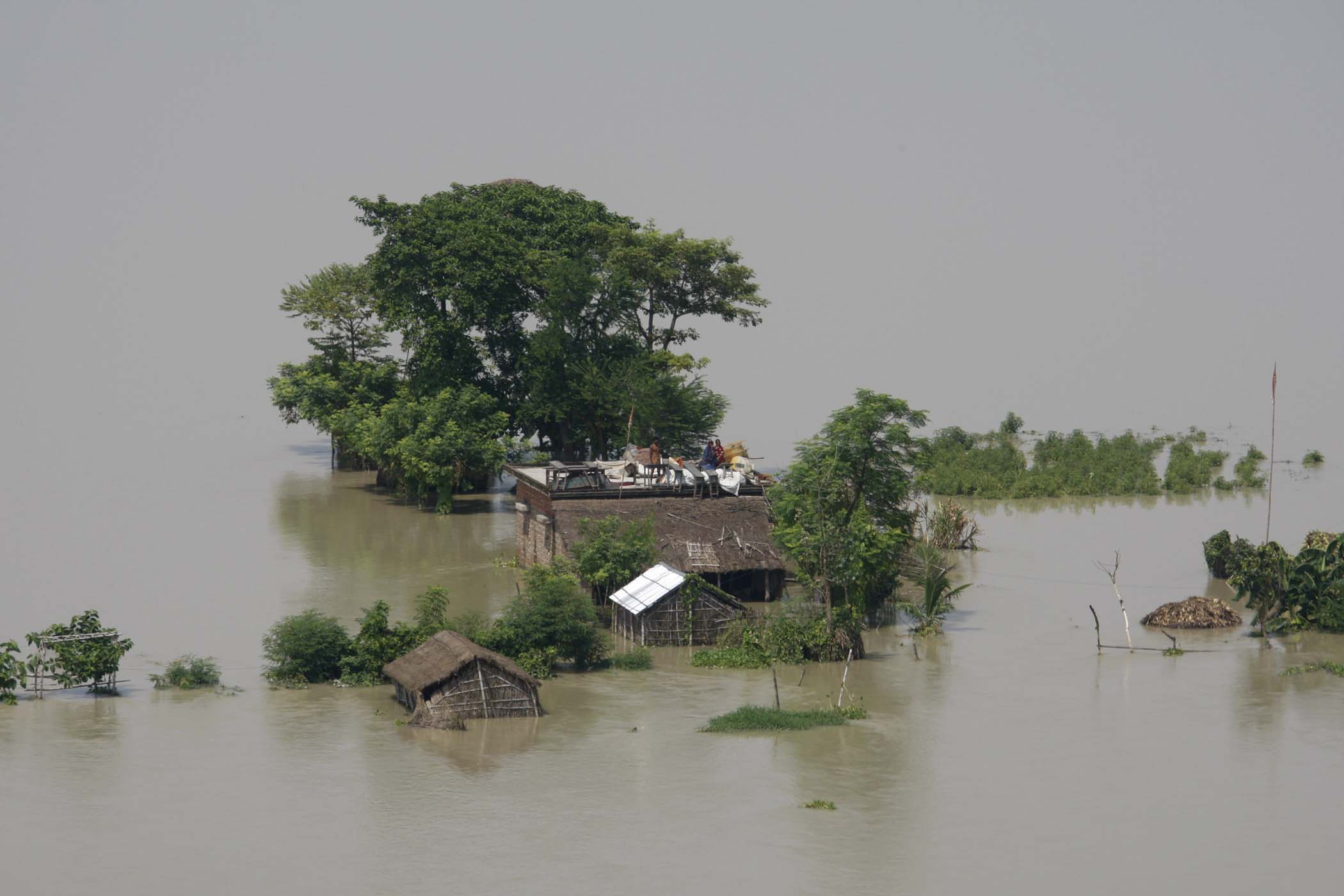
An aerial view of the flood affected village with people sitting on the roofs of houses Bihar

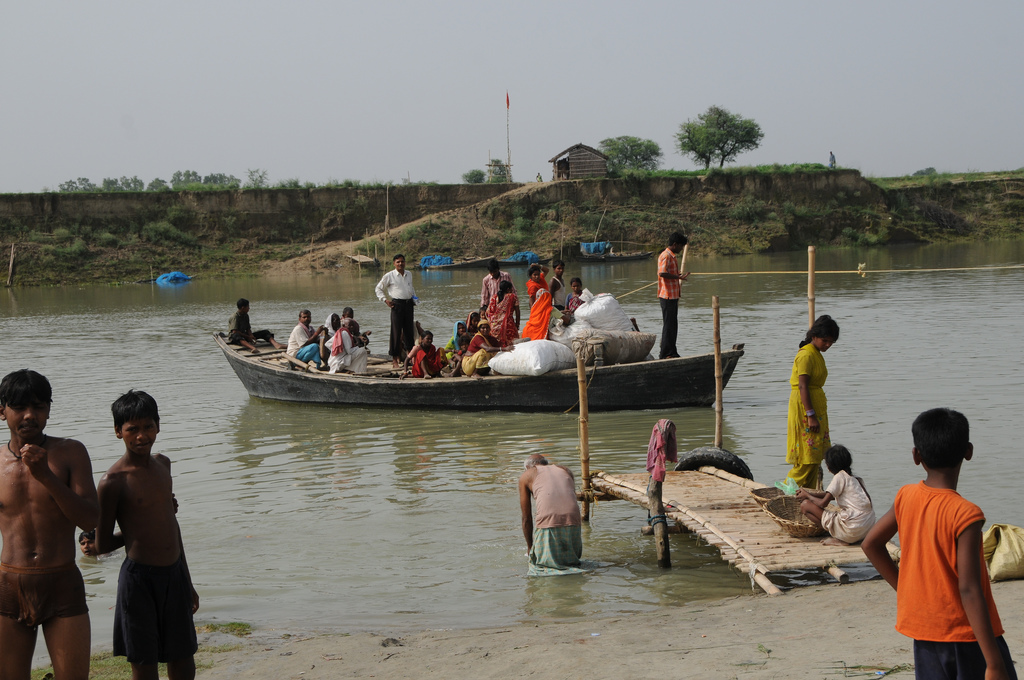
2008 Bihar floods

In response to the disaster, widely reported as the region's worst flood in 50 years, Nitish Kumar, Chief Minister of Bihar, met Indian Prime Minister Manmohan Singh to seek his help in dealing with the "catastrophe".

The Prime Minister declared a "natural calamity" on 28 August and earmarked US$230 million in aid for the region. Rescue operations were carried out by the Indian Army, National Disaster Response Force (NDRF) and non-government organisations. Indian Air Force helicopters dropped relief supplies in the worst-hit districts. Mumbai Fire Brigade sent a 22-member disaster management team to help in relief work.

Chief Minister Nitish Kumar requested a rehabilitation package of Rs 145 billion from the central government for the flood ravaged Kosi region.

The Bihar government returned funds from Gujarat for relief work because of purported differences with the Gujarat Chief Minister, Narendra Modi.

On 1 September, describing the floods as a "disaster," the Dalai Lama gave 1,000,000 rupees to the Bihar government for relief work.

The Government of Bihar initiated Kosi Reconstruction and Rehabilitation Programme covering 30,000 affected families in Saharsa, Supaul and Madhepura district based on a pilot project implemented by ODR Collaborative, a network of organisations, supporting the Government and an owner driven reconstruction policy was formulated to support each family with Rs. 55,000 to construct their own house. After signing an agreement with the World Bank in January 2011, this programme has been upscaled to cover 100,000 families for reconstruction of hazard safe houses. The cost per house will be Rs. 55,000 ($1200) with an additional cost of Rs. 2,300 ($50) for a toilet and Rs. 5,000 ($110) for solar powered lighting. In cases where beneficiaries do not own land, the Government of Bihar will provide additional assistance of Rs. 5000 ($110) for the people to buy the land. Towards this project, the World Bank is contributing $220 million. The Government of Bihar has also partnered with ODR Collaborative and UNDP to continue the social and technical facilitation and capacity building for this 'owner driven reconstruction' programme. Technical guidelines have been brought out to enable owners to build houses with various local materials including bamboo.

The rehabilitation work has been incredibly slow. Out of a total 100,000 houses to be built by the Government in the Kosi region comprising Madhepura, Saharsa and Supaul districts, only 12,500 were built till February 2014.

== Administrative lapse ==
Fax messages sent by engineers at the Kosi dam warning the state government of the impending disaster went unheeded as the official authorised to respond was on leave. Consequently, many residents waiting for evacuation instructions never received warning of the flood. Nitish Mishra, Bihar's disaster management minister said that action should be taken to hold those responsible accountable.

== Investigation ==
Bihar Government appointed a one-man inquiry commission, headed by Justice Rajesh Walia, former chief justice of Patna High Court, to probe the cause of the embankment breach. It was asked to examine all aspects related to the efforts to maintain the utility of the Kosi project since its inception in 1953 – particularly after a major landslide in 1979 pushed the Kosi towards its eastern bund – and a breach in 1991. The Commission submitted its report in March 2014.

== See also ==
- CNN-IBN 30 Minutes documentary on Bihar Floods 2008 by Marya Shakil – Part 1 Part 2 Part 3 Part 4
- 2008 Indian floods
- Flood in Bihar
- Kosi River#2008 flood in Bihar
