= North Bihar =

- Geographic Region
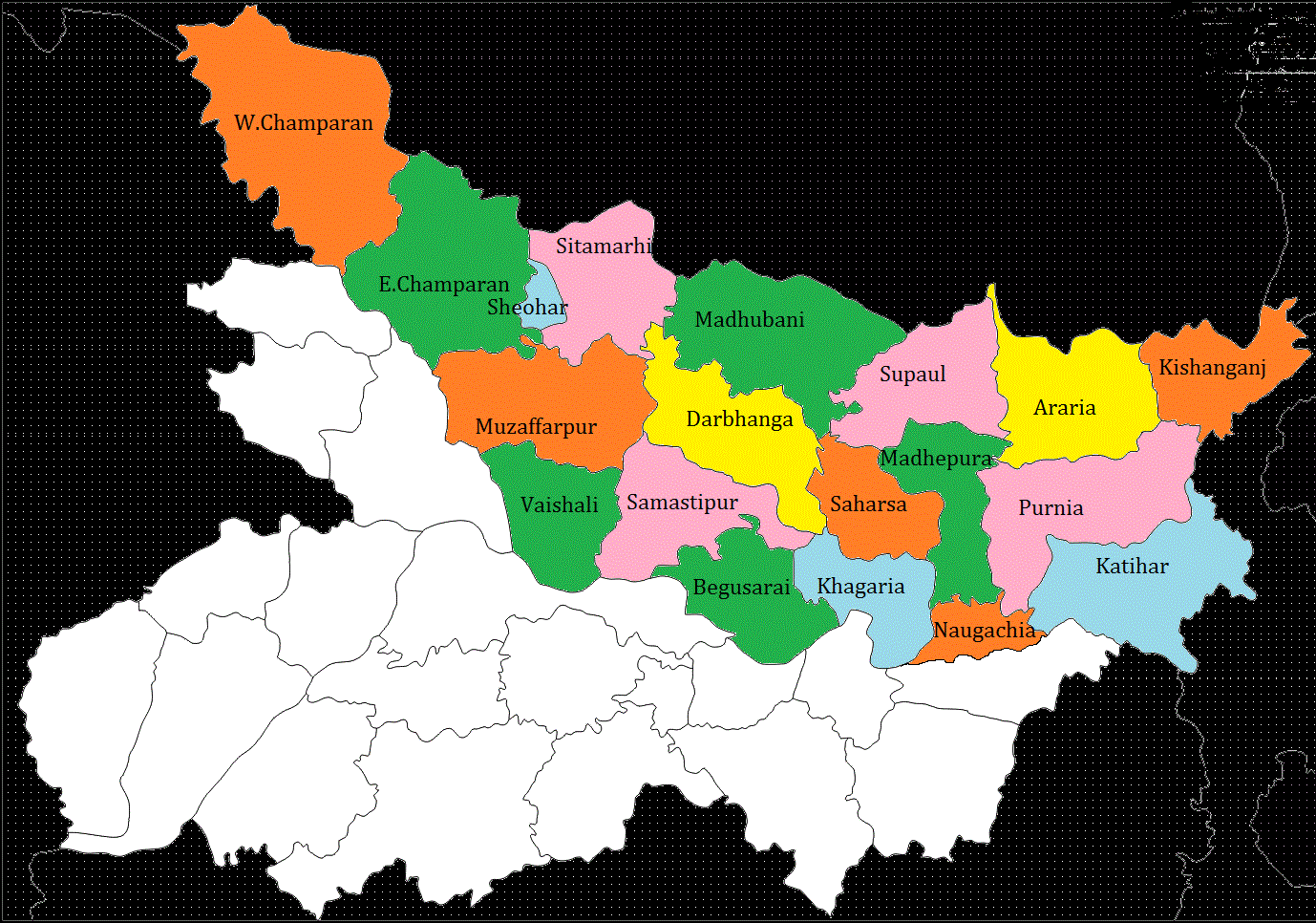

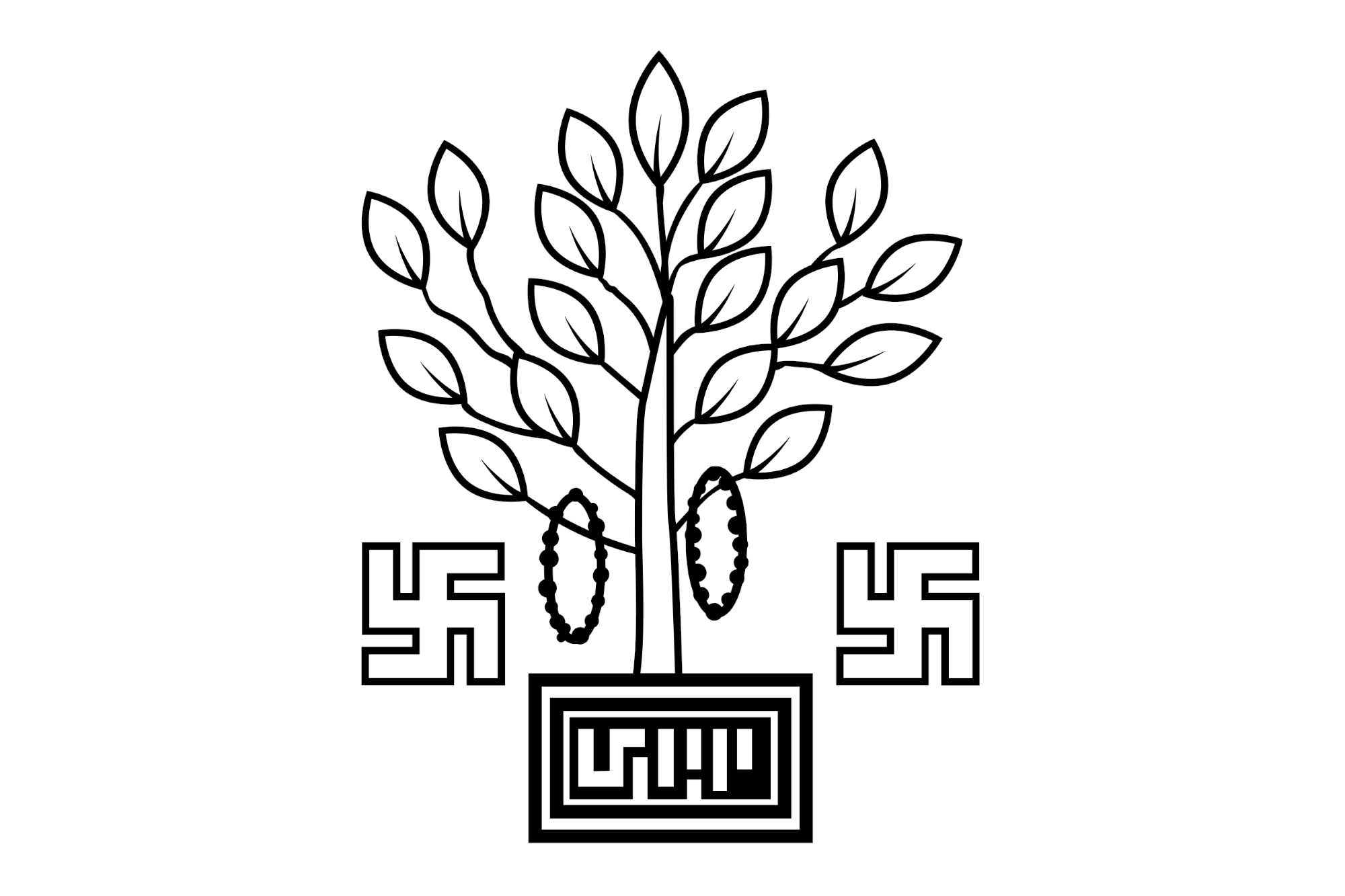
- Seal
- Interactive map of North Bihar
- Coordinates: 26.07°N 85.45°E
- Country: India
- State: Bihar
- Time zone: UTC+5:30 (IST)
- Lok Sabha: 21
- Vidhan Sabha: 127+2
- Districts: 21
- Main Languages: Maithili, Bhojpuri, and Hindi
- Emerging towns: Samastipur, Supaul, Araria, Madhepura, Samastipur, Madhubani, Bettiah, Gopalganj, Saharsa, Sitamarhi
- Emerged towns: Muzaffarpur, Darbhanga, Motihari, Purnea, Begusarai,Katihar
- Industrial and Financial capital: Begusarai
- Website: Official Website

North Bihar is the northern region of the Indian state of Bihar. It lies between the Ganga River in the south and the India–Nepal border in the north. The region forms part of the fertile Gangetic Plain and is mainly flat in terrain.

== Geography ==
North Bihar lies in the northern part of the Indian state of Bihar. It is bounded by the Ganga River to the south and the India–Nepal border to the north. The region forms a part of the Middle Gangetic Plain and is one of the most fertile areas of eastern India due to continuous deposition of alluvium by Himalayan rivers.

=== Physiography ===
The terrain of North Bihar is almost entirely flat and low-lying, with a gentle slope from north to south. The average elevation ranges between 40 and 100 metres above sea level. The land is composed mainly of recent alluvial deposits, making it suitable for intensive agriculture.

=== Rivers ===
North Bihar is drained by several perennial rivers originating in the Himalayas. Major rivers include the Kosi, Gandak, Bagmati, Burhi Gandak, Kamla, Mahananda and the Adhwara river system. Most of these rivers flow southwards and ultimately join the Ganga.

The Kosi River is known for frequent changes in its course and is often referred to as the Sorrow of Bihar due to recurrent floods and heavy sediment deposition.

=== Floodplains ===
Large parts of North Bihar fall within active floodplains. Seasonal flooding during the monsoon is common, especially in districts such as Saharsa, Supaul, Madhepura, Darbhanga, Sitamarhi and Muzaffarpur. While floods enrich the soil, they also cause regular damage to crops, settlements and infrastructure.

=== Soil ===
The soil of North Bihar is predominantly alluvial. Sandy loam soils are found near riverbanks, while clayey soils occur in low-lying areas. These fertile soils support crops such as rice, wheat, maize, pulses and sugarcane.

=== Climate ===
North Bihar experiences a humid subtropical climate with hot summers, a monsoon season from June to September, and cool winters. The average annual rainfall ranges between 1,100 and 1,400 mm, most of which is received during the southwest monsoon.

=== Seismicity ===
The region falls under Seismic Zones IV and V, indicating high seismic risk due to its proximity to the Himalayan tectonic region.

== Divisions and Districts of North Bihar ==
North Bihar – Divisions, Districts, Area & Population (2011 Census)
Division	Division HQ	District	District HQ	District Area (km^{2})	District Population
Tirhut	Muzaffarpur	West Champaran	Bettiah	5,228	3,935,042
Tirhut	Muzaffarpur	East Champaran	Motihari	3,969	5,082,868
Tirhut	Muzaffarpur	Muzaffarpur	Muzaffarpur	3,174	4,801,062
Tirhut	Muzaffarpur	Sitamarhi	Sitamarhi	2,294	3,419,622
Tirhut	Muzaffarpur	Sheohar	Sheohar	443	656,246
Tirhut	Muzaffarpur	Vaishali	Hajipur	2,036	3,495,249
Saran	Chhapra	Saran	Chhapra	2,641	3,951,862
Saran	Chhapra	Siwan	Siwan	2,219	3,330,464
Saran	Chhapra	Gopalganj	Gopalganj	2,033	2,562,012
Darbhanga	Darbhanga	Darbhanga	Darbhanga	2,279	3,937,385
Darbhanga	Darbhanga	Madhubani	Madhubani	3,501	4,487,379
Darbhanga	Darbhanga	Samastipur	Samastipur	2,904	4,261,566
Kosi	Saharsa	Saharsa	Saharsa	1,686	1,900,661
Kosi	Saharsa	Madhepura	Madhepura	2,407	2,001,762
Kosi	Saharsa	Supaul	Supaul	2,410	2,229,076
Purnea	Purnea	Purnia	Purnia	3,229	3,264,619
Purnea	Purnea	Katihar	Katihar	3,057	3,071,029
Purnea	Purnea	Araria	Araria	2,830	2,811,569
Purnea	Purnea	Kishanganj	Kishanganj	1,884	1,690,400

== Languages ==
- Bajjika, is predominantly Spoken in Muzaffarpur district, Vaishali, Sitamarhi, Samastipur & its Nearby Districts
- Bhojpuri is predominantly spoken in West Champaran, East Champaran districts and Saran division.
- Maithili is spoken in Darbhanga division, Kosi division and in some parts of Purnia division.
- Surjapuri is spoken in Kishanganj and in some eastern parts of Purnia district and Katihar.

== Economy & Industries in North Bihar ==
North Bihar, spanning the fertile plains north of the Ganga river, remains a region deeply rooted in agriculture, while also showing signs of growing industrial diversification.

=== Economy & Industry ===
Muzaffarpur is the most industrialized district of North Bihar and is often referred to as the economic and financial capital of the region. Muzaffarpur and Vaishali are among the fastest-growing and most developed districts of Bihar after Patna.

Reowned Indsutrial Units

- Diesel Locomotive Factory- Saran
- Muzaffarpur Bag Cluster
- Kanti Thermal Power Station - Muzaffarpur
- Mega Food Park Muzaffarpur
- Oswal Logistics - Hajipur
- AFP Manufacturing Co. Pvt. Ltd - hajipur

== Rivers and floods ==
There are several rivers flowing through this region from north to south and merge in the Ganges river. These rivers, along with floods, bring fertile soil to the region on a yearly basis. However, sometimes government sponsored floods causes loss of thousands of lives. Major rivers of North Bihar are Mahananda, Gandak, Kosi, Bagmati, Kamala, Balan, Budhi Gandak.

=== Natural floods ===
Since the beginning of human civilization, rivers have been an important part of human life. North Bihar has 7 major rivers and several tributaries to them. North Bihar districts are vulnerable to at least five major flood-causing rivers during the monsoon – Mahananda River, Koshi River, Bagmati River, Burhi Gandak River and Gandak – which originate in Nepal. All these rivers receive water from the Himalayas, so these rivers always have an adequate water supply. Every year, these rivers bring valuable floods for the people of North Bihar. Flood waters used to enter the agricultural land, leave their quite fertile silt and recede to the river. This pattern of humane flood was beneficial for North Bihar, making the land perfectly fertile. However, there are no more natural floods as of today.

=== Man-made floods ===
Soon after independence, the Congress Government of Bihar made several attempts to domesticate these rivers. High barriers or Bandhs were made on their both banks. This resulted in inhumane and destructive floods. Bandhs caused deposition of silts in the bottom of rivers, because of which, depth of rivers decreased, and so their water holding capacity also decreased. This is the reason these rivers bring more frequent floods now. With flood water, sand comes in force and gets deposited on the land. This way the land of the region in turning barren. Floods, once a boon for North Bihar, has now become a curse.

=== Kosi flood 2008, ===
2008 Kosi flood
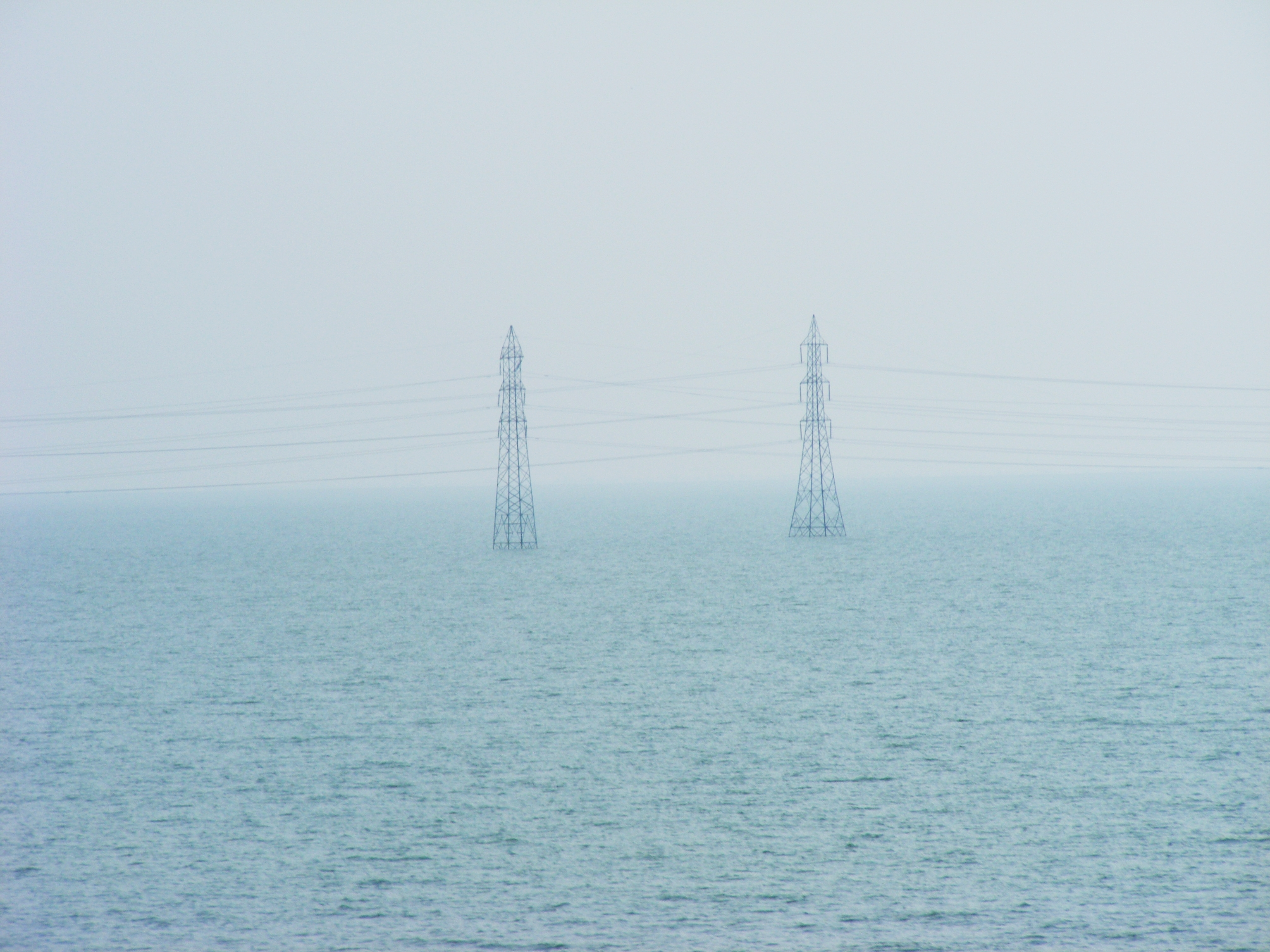
- Flooded North Bihar
- Date: 18 August 2008
- Location: North Bihar
- Deaths: 434 (Dead bodies were found until 27 November 2008)

The 2008 Kosi flood was one of the most disastrous floods in the history of North Bihar, an impoverished and densely populated region in India. A breach in the Kosi embankment near the Indo-Nepal border (at Kusha in Nepal) occurred on 18 August 2008. The river changed course and inundated areas which were not flooded in decades. The flood affected over 2.3 million people in North Bihar.

The flood killed 250 people and forced nearly 3 million people from their homes in North Bihar. More than 300,000 houses were destroyed and at least 340,000 hectares (840,000 acres) of crops were damaged. Villagers in North Bihar ate raw rice and flour mixed with polluted water. Hunger and disease were widespread. The Supaul district was the worst-hit; surging waters swamped 1,000 square kilometers (250,000 acres) of farmlands, destroying crops.

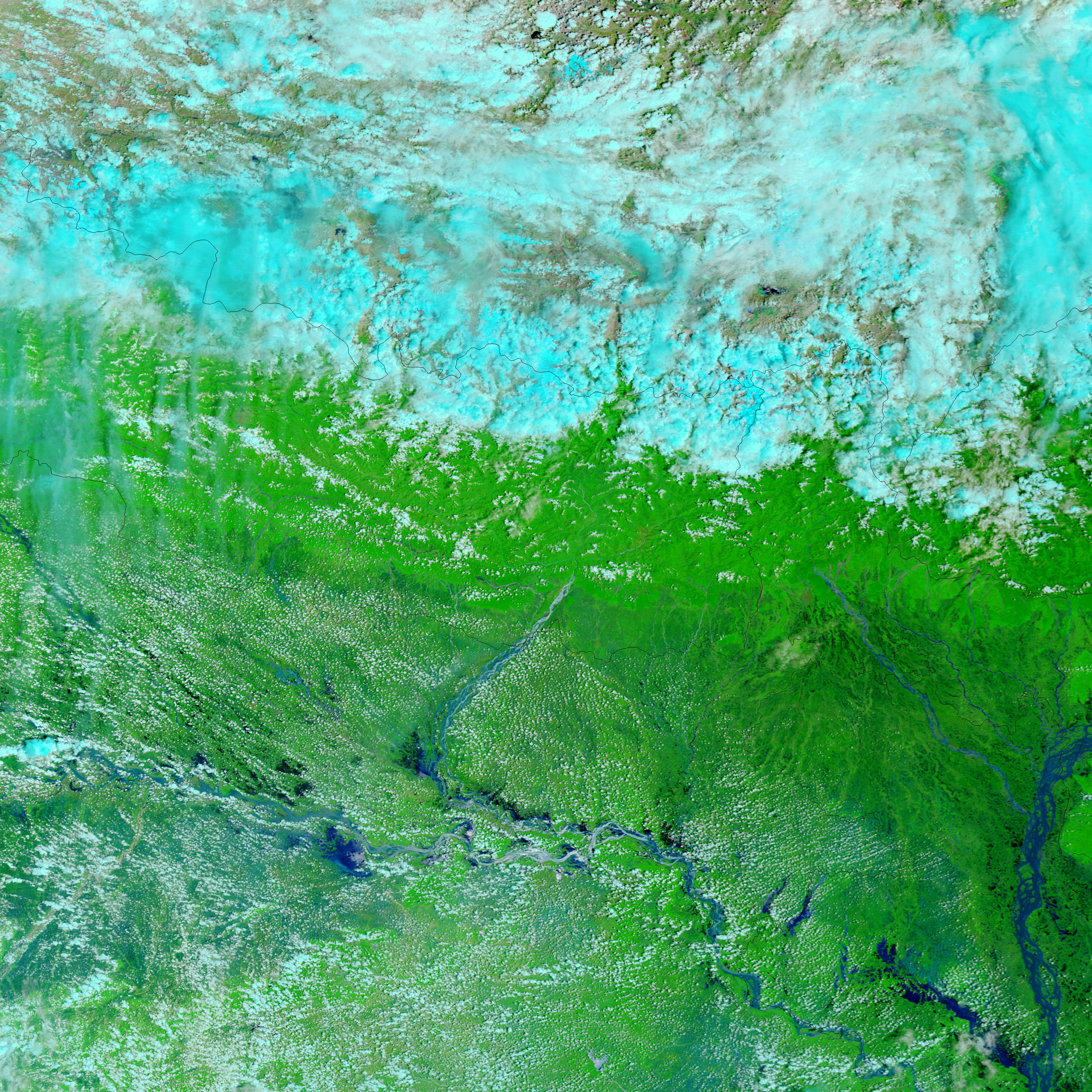
The Kosi before it flooded in August 2008

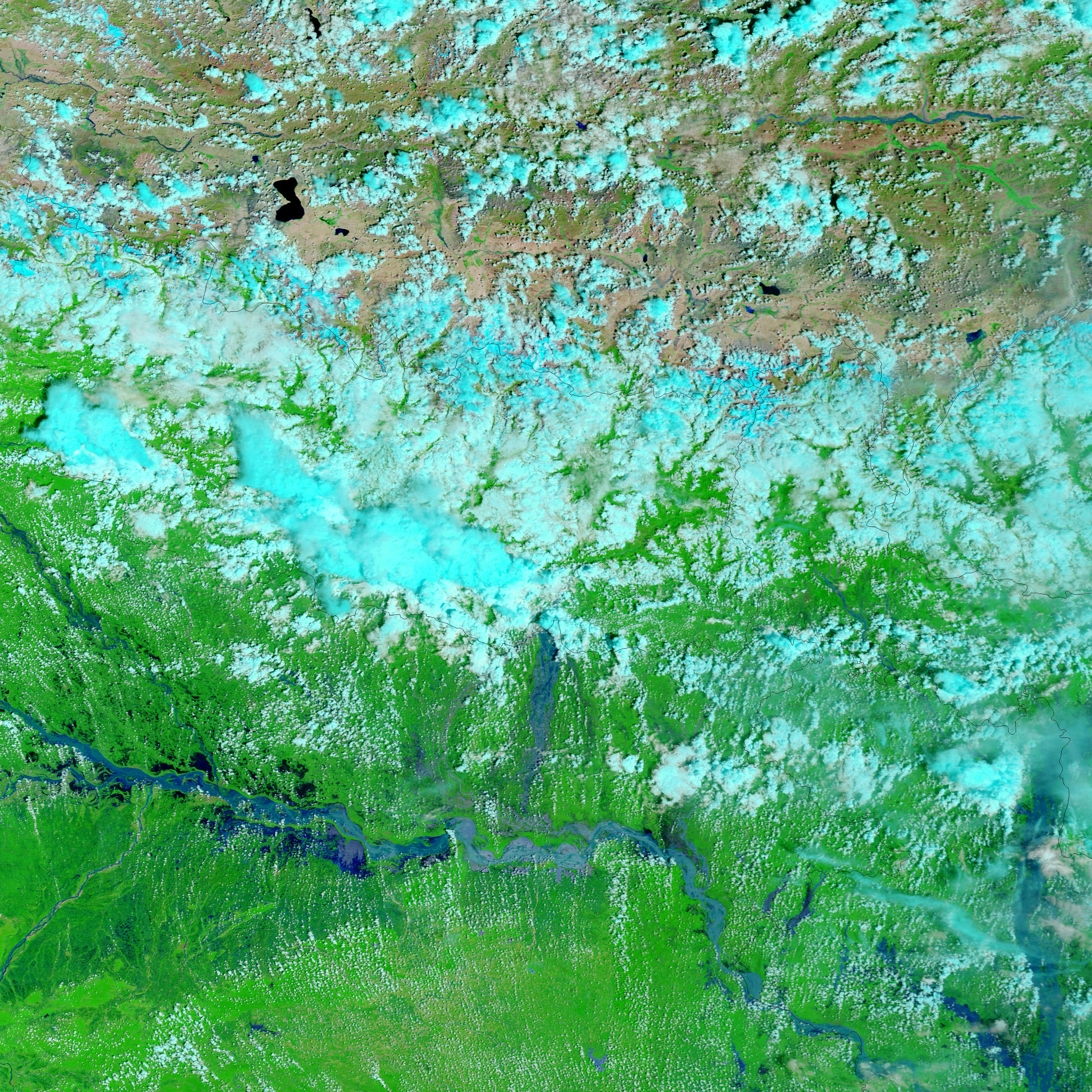
The Kosi during the August 2008 flood

=== 2017 North Bihar Floods ===
2017 North Bihar Flood
- Date: August 2017
- Location: North Bihar, India
- Deaths: 514

The 2017 North Bihar Floods affected 19 districts of North Bihar causing death of 514 people. This flood was result of sudden increase in water discharge through the Gandak, Burhi Gandak, Bagmati, Kamla, Kosi and Mahananda Rivers due to heavy rain in the catchment areas of the major rivers of north Bihar in Nepal. Araria district accounted for 95 deaths alone, followed by Sitamarhi (34), West Champaran (29), Katihar (26), East Champaran (19) while 22 have died in Madhubani, Supaul (13) and Madhepura (15). 11 deaths were reported in Kishanganj, while Darbhanga accounted for 19 deaths, Purnea (9), Gopalganj (9), Sheohar (4), Muzaffarpur (7), Samastipur (1) and Saharsa (4) registered four deaths each while Khagaria and Saran accounted for 7 deaths each. Nowadays, around 1.71 people on average are affected by floods alone.

== See also ==
- Bihar
- North India
