= Koshi Barrage =

Barrage in Bhimnagar, Nepal

Koshi Barrage कोशी ब्यारेज
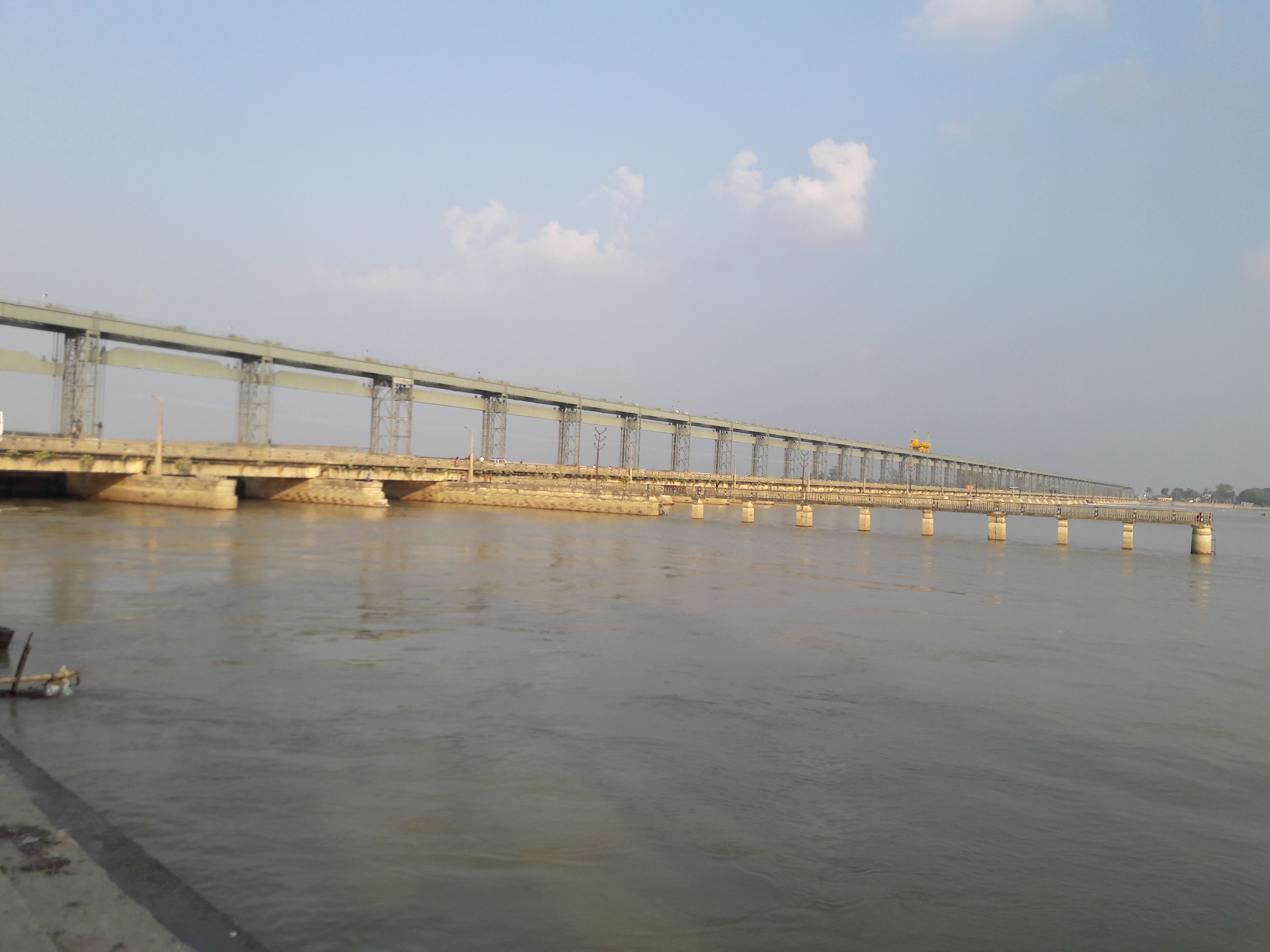
- Koshi Barrage
- Coordinates: 26.5263°N 86.9269°E
- Carries: Motor vehicles, pedestrians, bicycles
- Crosses: Koshi River
- Locale: Sunsari and Saptari
- Official name: Koshi Barrage
- Named for: Koshi River

Characteristics
- Design: Truss bridge Aqueduct
- Material: Concrete, steel
- Total length: 1,150 m (3,773.0 ft)
- Width: 10 m (32.8 ft)
- No. of lanes: 1

History
- Designer: Joseph and Company Limited, India
- Constructed by: Joseph and Company Limited, India
- Construction start: 1958
- Construction end: 1962
- Opened: 1962; 64 years ago

Location
- Interactive map of Koshi Barrage

The Koshi Barrage also known as Kosi Barrage is a sluice across the Koshi river in the Nepalese Mithila region that carries vehicular, bicycle, and pedestrian traffic between Madhesh Province and Koshi Province of Nepal. It is near the International border with India. The barrage was built between 1958 and 1962, and it has 56 gates. It was constructed after the Koshi Agreement was signed between the Government of Nepal and India on 25 April 1954. The barrage was designed and built by Joseph and Company Limited, India. The Koshi Tappu Wildlife Reserve is roughly 3–4 miles north of the barrage.

== 2008 flood ==
In August 2008, the eastern embankments of the Koshi Barrage collapsed, several miles north of the Nepal-India border. The resulting flood wiped out miles of fertile farmland in Nepal, covering it with a thick layer of river sand, and affected 53,800 Nepalese. It left 3 million people homeless in Bihar, India.

== 2017 flood ==
Every year, several areas of Terai are affected due to the flood and blockage of this barrage. This affects mostly the Koshi region of Bihar (Supaul, Saharsa, Madhepura and Purnia). The Kosi River is known as the "Sorrow of Bihar" as the annual floods affect about 21,000 km^{2} (8,100 sq mi) of fertile agricultural land, thereby disturbing the rural economy. The Koshi has an average water flow (discharge) of 2,166 m^{3}/s (76,500 cu ft/s).

== Tourism ==
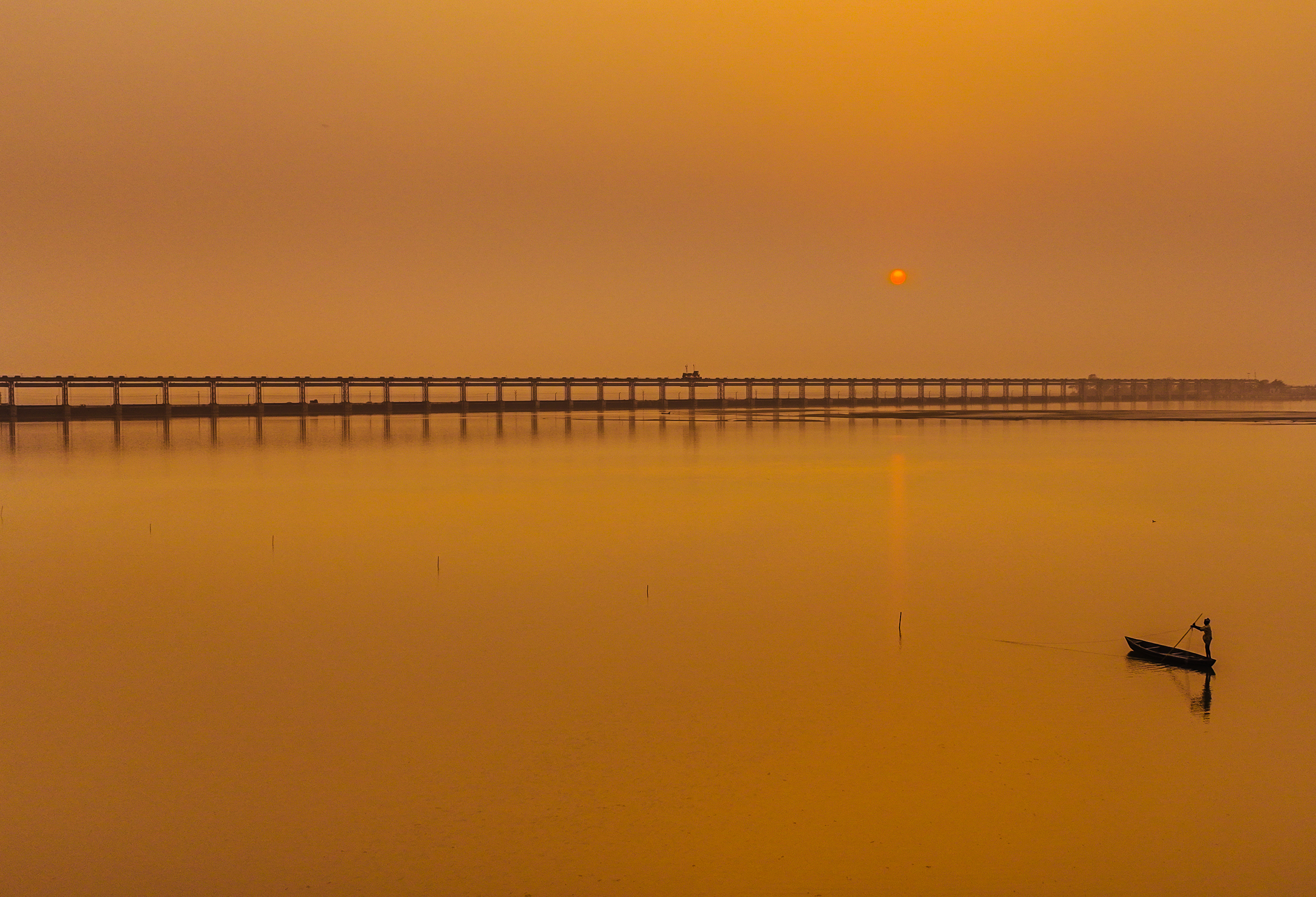
A fisherman on the river near the barrage, collecting fish.

This river is home to the Gangetic Dolphin and other species of freshwater fish. Siberian birds can be seen there easily during August–October. People usually visit there to have a variety of fish dishes in the nearby riverside restaurants and see the scenic view from the barrage.

== Air transport ==
Rajbiraj Airport is the nearest airport roughly 26 km (16 mi) away is located in district headquarter and nearest city Rajbiraj. Shree Airlines and Buddha Air operate daily flights between Rajbiraj and Kathmandu

== See also ==
- Kosi embankment
