= Sachet (app) =

Emergency management app

- Original author: Government of India
- Developer: National Disaster Management Authority
- Release: Mar 7, 2023
- Stable release: 1.3.4 / Apr 28, 2024
- Operating system: Android, iOS
- Service name: Disaster early warning
- Available in: 12 languages
- List of languages: Hindi; English; Bengali; Gujarati; Kannada; Malayalam; Marathi; Punjabi; Tamil; Telugu; Odia; Urdu
- Website: sachet.ndma.gov.in

Sachet is a disaster early warning and response mobile application for android, by Government of India to enhance disaster preparedness and response in India. It support 12 Indian regional language.

== Founder and operator ==
It was developed by the National Disaster Management Authority (NDMA). The app provides real-time, geo-tagged alerts on various natural disasters such as floods, earthquakes, cyclones, and heatwaves. Location-specific notifications allow users to take timely and informed actions. Prime Minister Narendra Modi announced its significance during his 'Mann Ki Baat' address, emphasizing its role in safeguarding lives.
