= Shri Krishna Chaudhary =

Director general of police

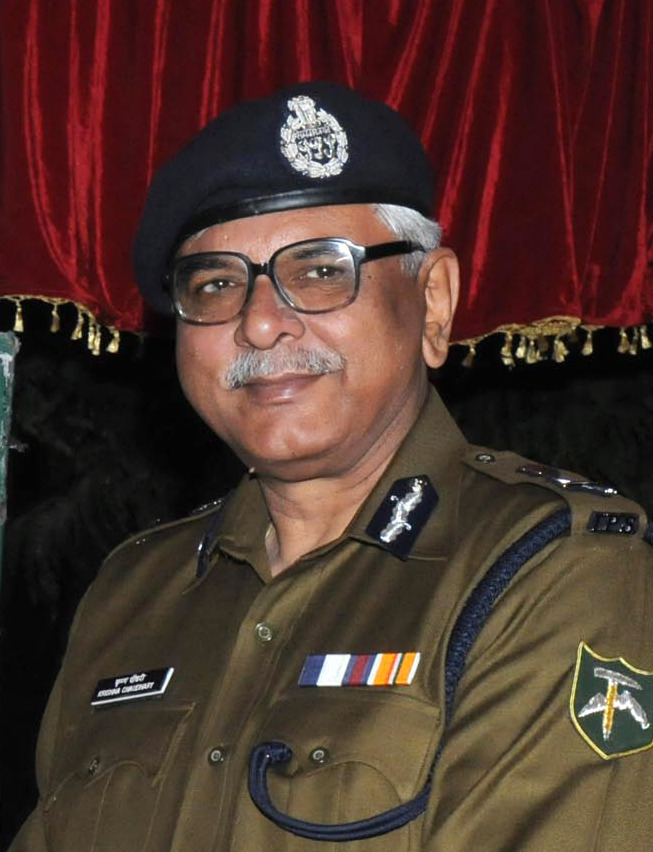

Director General of National Disaster Response Force (NDRF)
- In office 10 July 2013 – 27 February 2014
- Preceded by: P.M. Nair
- Succeeded by: Mahboob Alam

Director General of Railway Protection Force
- In office 28 February 2014 – February 2015

Director General of Indo-Tibetan Border Police
- In office 10 February 2015 – June 2017

Personal details
- Education: Patna University
- Awards: President's Police Medal for Distinguished Service; Police Medal for Meritorious Service

Shri Krishna Chaudhary is the former Director General of National Disaster Response Force, Director General of Railway Protection Force, Director General of Indo-Tibetan Border Police and an IPS officer of 1979 batch from Bihar cadre.

He also served as a Superintendent of Police in Central Bureau of Investigation (CBI) for four years.
