= National Disaster Response Force =

Indian specialised force

- राष्ट्रीय आपदा मोचन बल
- Insignia of National Disaster Response Force

Agency overview
- Formed: 19 January 2006; 20 years ago
- Jurisdiction: Government of India
- Headquarters: Directorate General, NDRF, 6th Floor, NDCC-II Building, Jai Singh Road, New Delhi - 110001
- Motto: "आपदा सेवा सदैव सर्वत्र" (Saving Lives & Beyond)
- Employees: 13,000 personnel
- Annual budget: ₹2,002.14 crore (US$213.9 million) (2026–27)
- Minister responsible: Amit Shah, Minister of Home Affairs
- Agency executive: Shri Piyush Anand, IPS, Director General; Training Institute, NDRF, Nagpur
- Parent department: Ministry of Home Affairs
- Key document: Disaster Management Act, 2005
- Website: ndrf.gov.in

The National Disaster Response Force (NDRF) is a specialized force in India, tasked with the responsibility of responding to natural and man-made disasters. It operates under the National Disaster Management Authority of Ministry of Home Affairs and was established in 2006 with the aim of strengthening disaster management capabilities in the country

The responsibility of managing disasters in India is that of the state governments. The ‘Nodal Ministry’ in the central government for management of natural disasters is the Ministry of Home Affairs (MHA).

The force also helps in coordinating the response to a disaster that has occurred and that overwhelms the resources of state authorities.

The NDRF is led by a Director General and also has several Inspector Generals (IG) and Deputy IGs, who are flag officers and wear badges of rank.

== Directors General ==
The head of the National Disaster Response Force is the Director General who is an Indian Police Service officer with the rank of an Additional Director General of Police. The first holder was R. K. Bhatia who served between 2009-2010. The current director general is Piyush Anand who has been in office since 1 April 2024.

#	Name	From	To	Tenure	Remarks
1	R. K. Bhatia, IPS (BH:1974)	6 February 2009	13 May 2010	1 year, 96 days	transferred as DG, ITBP
2	Rajiv, IPS (UP:1975)	14 May 2010	7 February 2012	1 year, 269 days	transferred as DG, CISF
3	Prakash Mishra, IPS (OR:1977)	5 March 2012	4 July 2012	121 days	transferred as DGP, Odisha
4	Dr. P. M. Nair, IPS (BH:1978)	24 August 2012	31 May 2013	280 days	formerly SDG, CRPF
5	Shri Krishna Chaudhary, IPS (BH:1979)	10 July 2013	27 February 2014	232 days	transferred as DG, RPF
6	Mahboob Alam, IPS (TN:1981)	28 February 2014	31 August 2014	184 days	formerly ADG, ITBP
7	O. P. Singh, IPS (UP:1983)	1 September 2014	26 September 2016	2 years, 25 days	formerly ADG, CISF; transferred as DG, CISF
8	R. K. Pachnanda, IPS (WB:1983)	26 September 2016	6 July 2017	283 days	formerly ADG, CISF; transferred as DG, ITBP
9	Sanjay Kumar, IPS (HP:1985)	6 July 2017	31 December 2018	1 year, 178 days	formerly DGP, Himachal Pradesh
10	Satya Narayan Pradhan, IPS (JH:1988)	22 January 2019	15 November 2021	2 years, 297 days	formerly Joint Secretary, Ministry of DoNER; transferred as DG, NCB
11	Atul Karwal, IPS (GJ:1988)	15 November 2021	31 March 2024	2 years, 137 days	formerly Director, SVPNPA
12	Piyush Anand, IPS (UP:1991)	1 April 2024	Incumbent	2 years, 235 days	formerly SDG, CISF

== Composition ==
National Disaster Response Force (NDRF) is a force of 16 battalions, organised on para-military lines, and composed of persons on deputation from the central armed police forces of India: three Border Security Force, three Central Reserve Police Force, two Central Industrial Security Force, two Indo-Tibetan Border Police, two Sashastra Seema Bal and one of the Assam Rifles. The total strength of each battalion is approximately 1149. Each battalion is capable of providing 18 self-contained specialist search and rescue teams of 45 personnel each including engineers, technicians, electricians, dog squads and medical/paramedics.

== Deployment ==
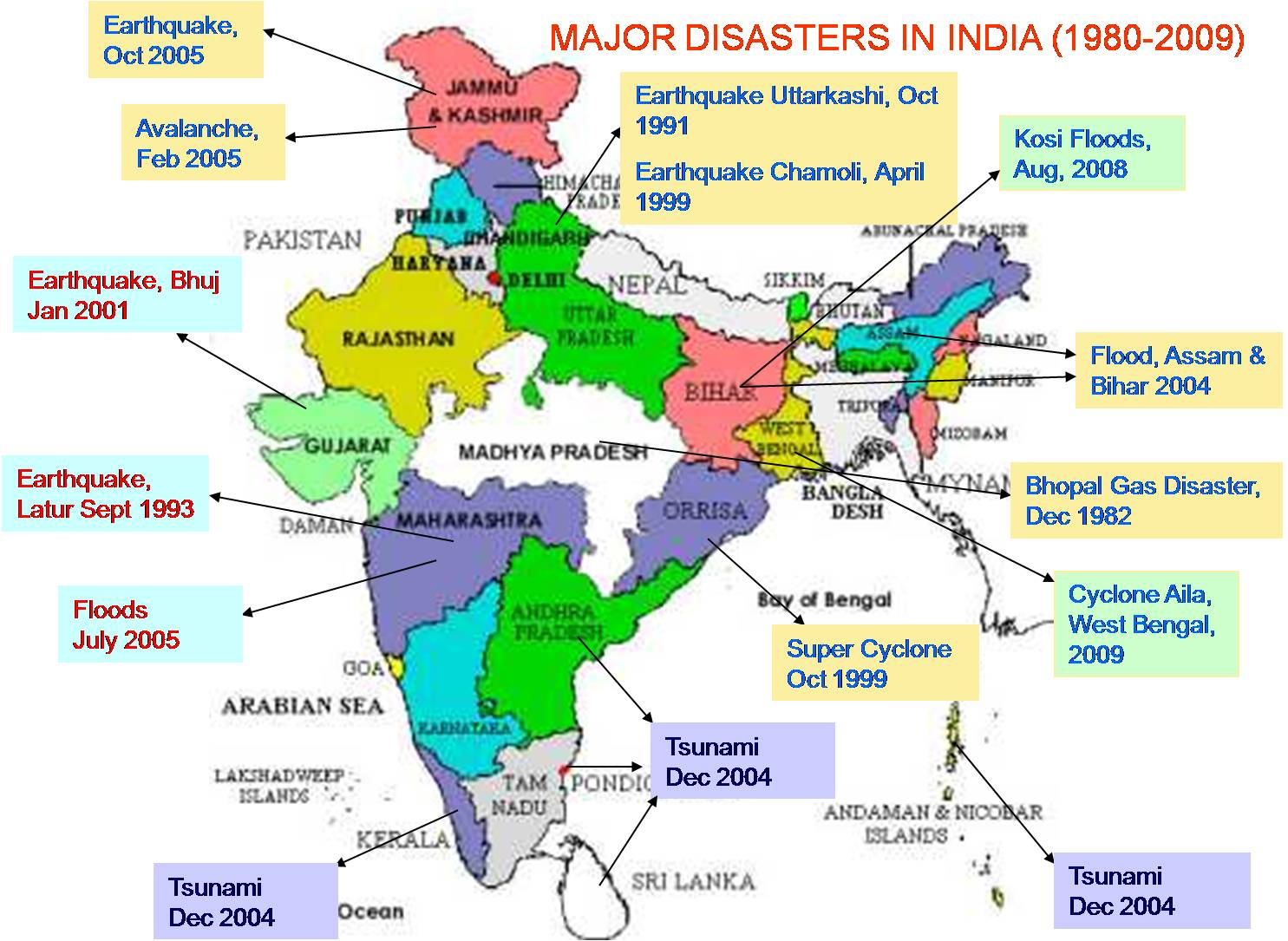
Major Disasters in India (1980–2009)

NDRF battalions are located at 12 different locations in the country based on the vulnerability profile to cut down the response time for their deployment. During the preparedness period fordisaster situations, proactive deployment of these forces is to be carried out by the NDMA in consultation with state authorities. Locations of NDRF Battalions are as follows:

S. No.	NDRF Unit	State	PMF
1	01 Bn NDRF, Guwahati	Assam	BSF
2	02 Bn NDRF, Nadia	West Bengal	BSF
3	03 Bn NDRF, Cuttack	Odisha	CISF
4	04 Bn NDRF, Vellore	Tamil Nadu	CISF
5	05 Bn NDRF, Pune	Maharashtra	CRPF
6	06 Bn NDRF, Vadodara	Gujarat	CRPF
7	07 Bn NDRF, Bhatinda	Punjab	ITBP
8	08 Bn NDRF, Ghaziabad	Uttar Pradesh	ITBP
9	09 Bn NDRF, Patna	Bihar	BSF
10	10 Bn NDRF, Vijayawada	Andhra Pradesh	CRPF
11	11 Bn NDRF, Varanasi	Uttar Pradesh	SSB
12	12 Bn NDRF, Itanagar	Arunachal Pradesh	SSB
13	13 Bn NDRF, Samba,	Jammu and Kashmir	Assam Rifles
14	14 Bn NDRF, Mandi	Himachal Pradesh	ITBP
15	15 Bn NDRF, Haldwani	Uttarakhand	ITBP
16	16 Bn NDRF, Najafgarh	New Delhi	BSF

== Mission ==
The National Disaster Management Authority aims to make India safer and disaster resilient by developing a proactive, multi-disaster, and technology driven strategy for disaster management. The agency's goal is using prevention, mitigation, and preparedness to ensure adequate response to disasters.

NDRF conducts rescue and relief operations, regular and intensive training, familiarization exercises within the area of responsibility of respective NDRF Battalions, and joint exercises.

== Disaster response ==
NDRF has proved its efficacy with its commendable performance during various disasters including the drowning cases, building collapses, landslides, devastating floods and Cyclones. NDRF has saved 133,192 human lives and retrieved 2760 dead bodies of disaster victims in 73 response operations in the country. Some of the major response operations of NDRF as below:

2007

- Flood in Bhavnagar, Gujarat – 3–5 July 2007 – Rescued 291 people; distributed 3,750 food packets
- Flood in Rajkot, Gujarat – 3–5 July 2007 – Rescued 291 people; distributed 3,750 food packets

2008

- Building collapse (Hotel Shakunt) in Ahmedabad, Gujarat – 3–5 Feb 2008 – Saved 10 people and recovered six dead bodies
- Flood in Lakhimpur, Assam – 14 June – 20 July 2008 – Rescued 2500 civilians
- Flood in Dhemaji, Assam – 16 June – 31 July 2008 – Rescued 600 people
- Flood in Lakhimpur, Assam – 21 July – 4 August 2008 – Evacuated 2000 people

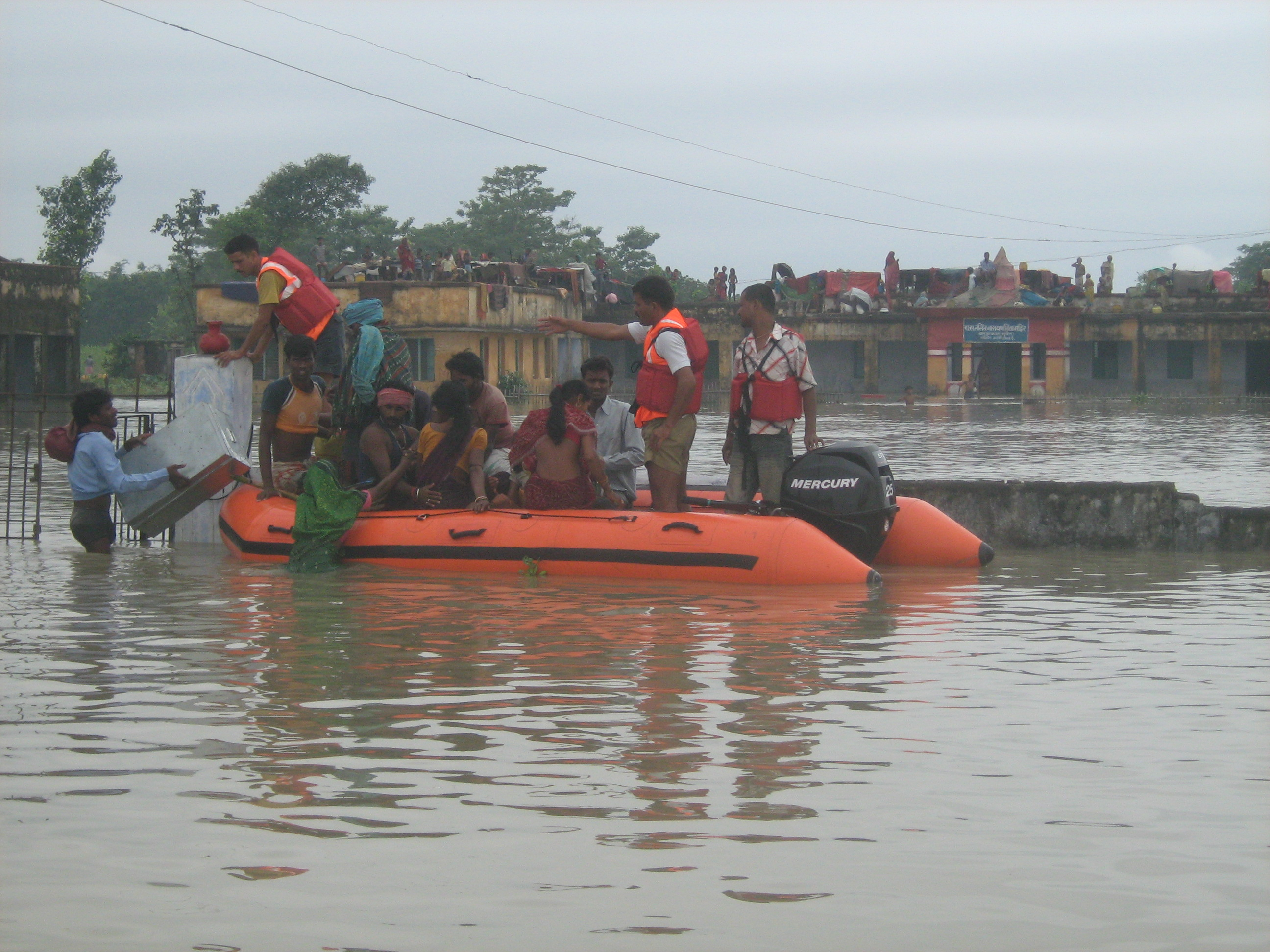
Rescue and relief operations during the Kosi breach in Bihar

- Kosi breach in Bihar – 20 August 2008 – Saved over 105,000 people including women, children and the elderly; distributed medicines and water bottles
- Flood in Lakhimpur, Assam – 31 Aug – 9 September 2008 – Saved 750 people
- Flood in Puri, Cuttack, Kendrapara & Jagatsinghpur, Odisha – Sept 2008 – Saved over 1000 people
- Flood in Kamrup, Assam – 28 September 2008 – Saved 350 people
- Flood in Tiruvarur, Tamil Nadu – 26–30 Nov 2008 – Saved 773 people
- Flood in Chennai, Tamil Nadu – 26 Nov – 2 December 2008 – Rescued 1550 people

2009

- Cyclone Aila in North 24 Parganas & South 24 Parganas, West Bengal – 25 May – 10 June 2009 – Rescued 2000 people; distribution of medicine to 30,000 victims & food packets to 16,000 homeless victims
- Flood in Barpeta, Assam – 27 May 2009 – Saved 300 people
- Flood in Junagarh and Porbandar, Gujarat – 16 to 29 July 2009 – Saved 2225 people
- Flood in Kasarkode, Kannur and Ernakulam, Kerala – 17–24 July 2009 – Saved 180 people
- Flood in Sitamarhi, Bihar (Bagmati breach) – 2–9 Aug 2009 – Rescued 1034 people; distributed medicines to 831 victims
- Flood in Howrah & Hooghly, West Bengal – 8–14 Sep 2009 – Rescue 675 people
- Andhra Pradesh & Karnataka Floods – Oct 2009 – Saved 10,659 people
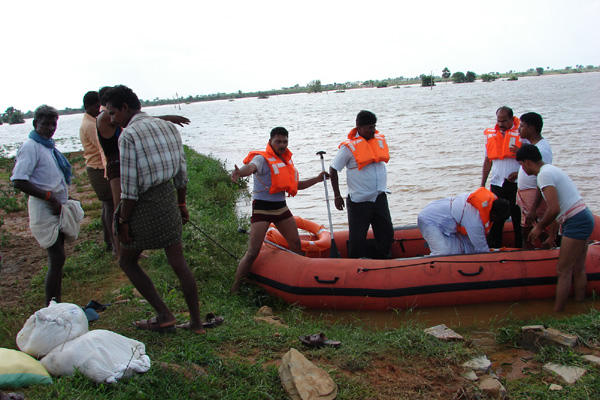
NDRF rescue and relief operation, Karnataka, 2009

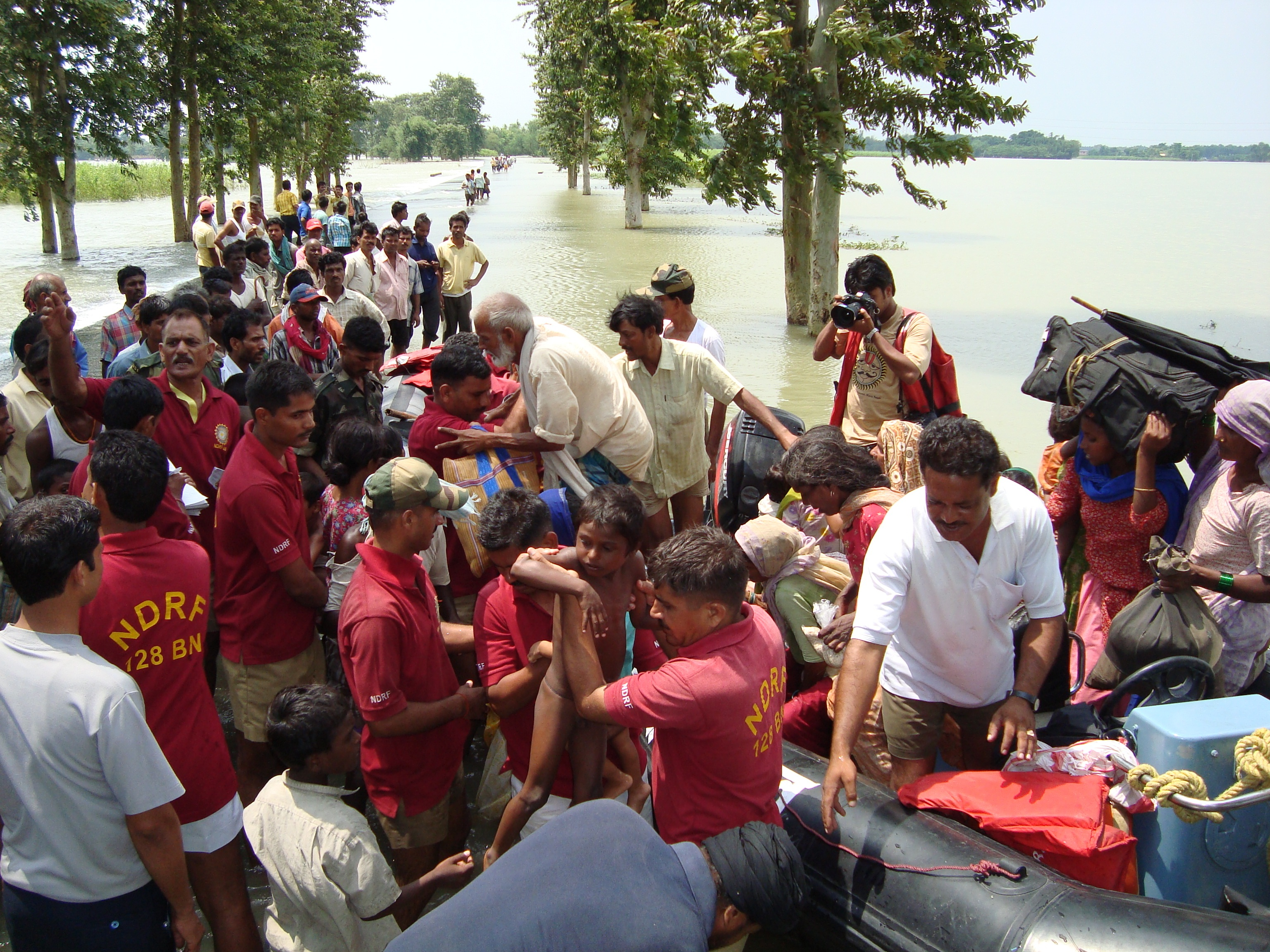
Rescue and relief work during the Odisha Flood of 2009

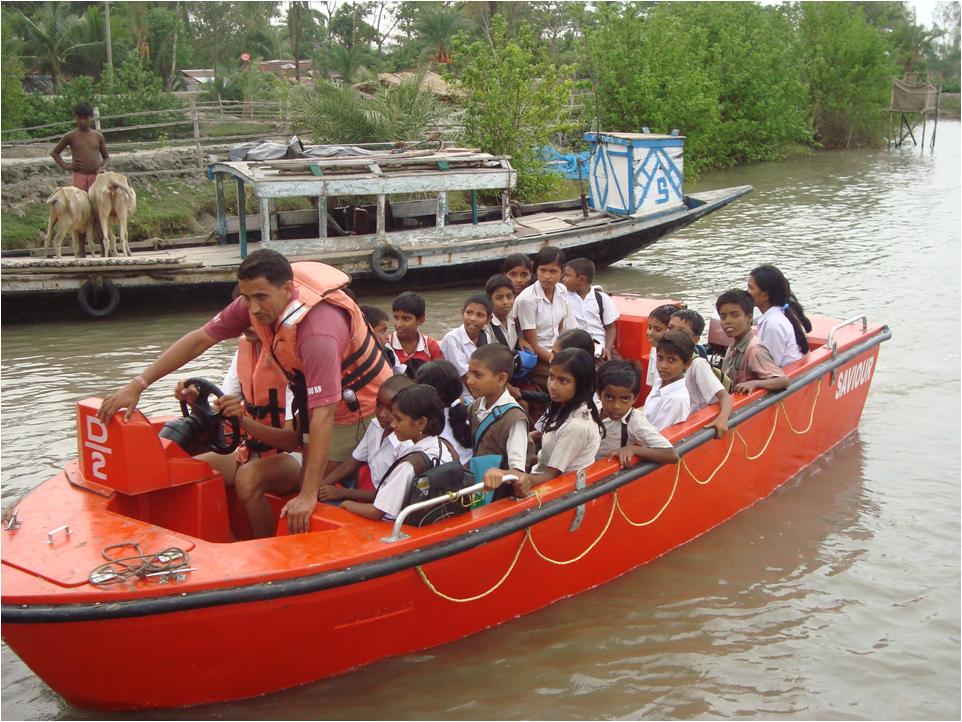
NDRF shifting school children to safer places during Cyclone Aila, 2009

2010

- Building collapse at Bellary, Karnataka – 27 January 2010 – Saved 20 human lives and recovered 27 dead bodies
- Flood in Guwahati, Assam – 20–25 April 2010 – Saved 300 human lives
- Cyclone Laila in Andhra Pradesh & Karnataka – 18 May 2010

2011

- 46 members NDRF team performed search and rescue operation in Onagawa, Miyagi (Japan).

2013

- Cyclone Phailin in the states of Andhra Pradesh, Odisha, etc. – The battalions of the army and navy were used to evacuate people.

2015

- NDRF rushed teams to parts of India and Nepal affected by a late April earthquake.
- Flood in Chennai, Tamil Nadu – 10 Nov

2018

- At least 58 teams of NDRF were deputed in Kerala during a flood in August 2018 making it the highest-ever deployment of NDRF in any single state since its raising. As many as 194 people were rescued and more than 10,000 evacuated.
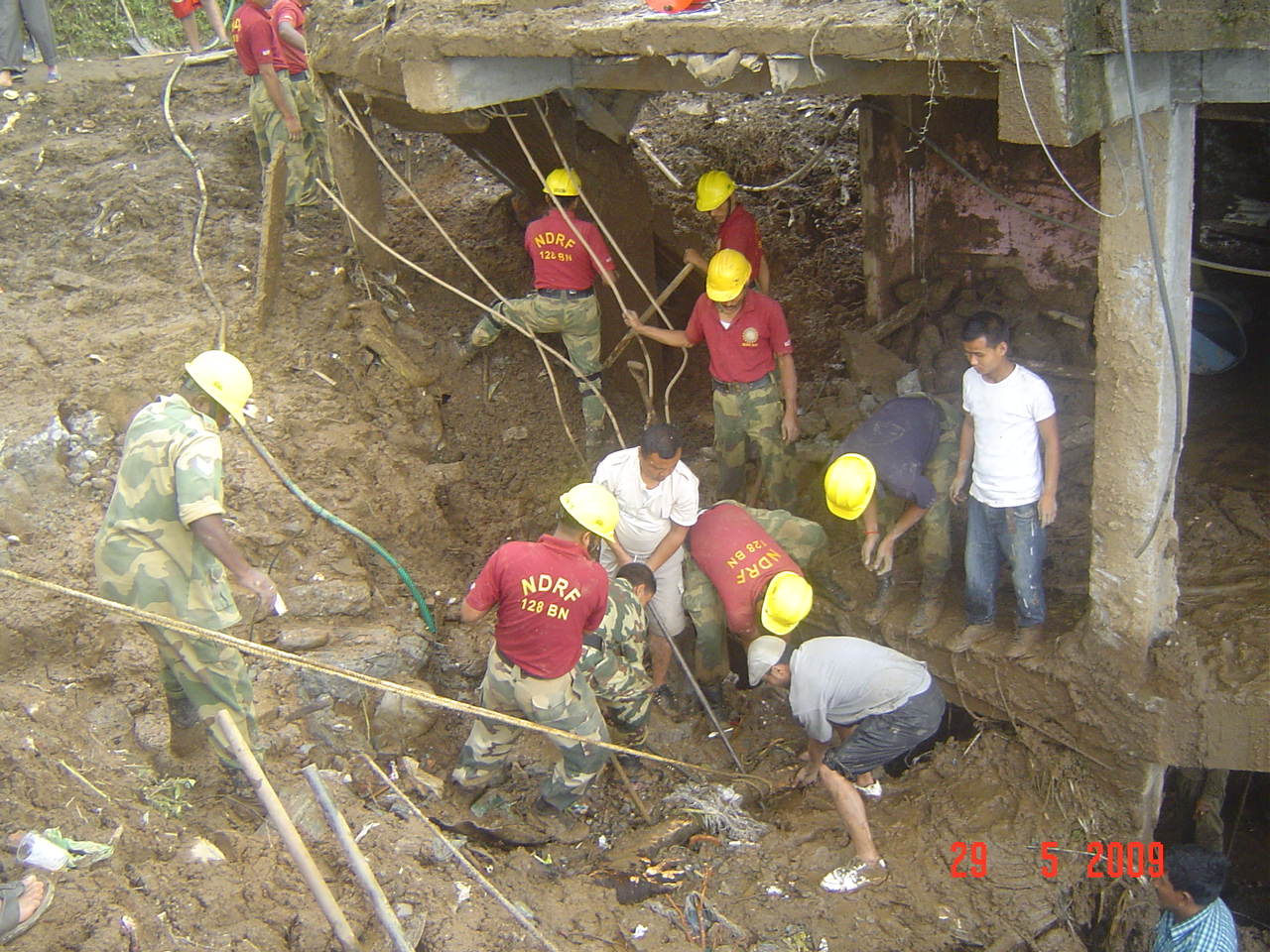
NDRF clearing debris of the Darjeeling landslide

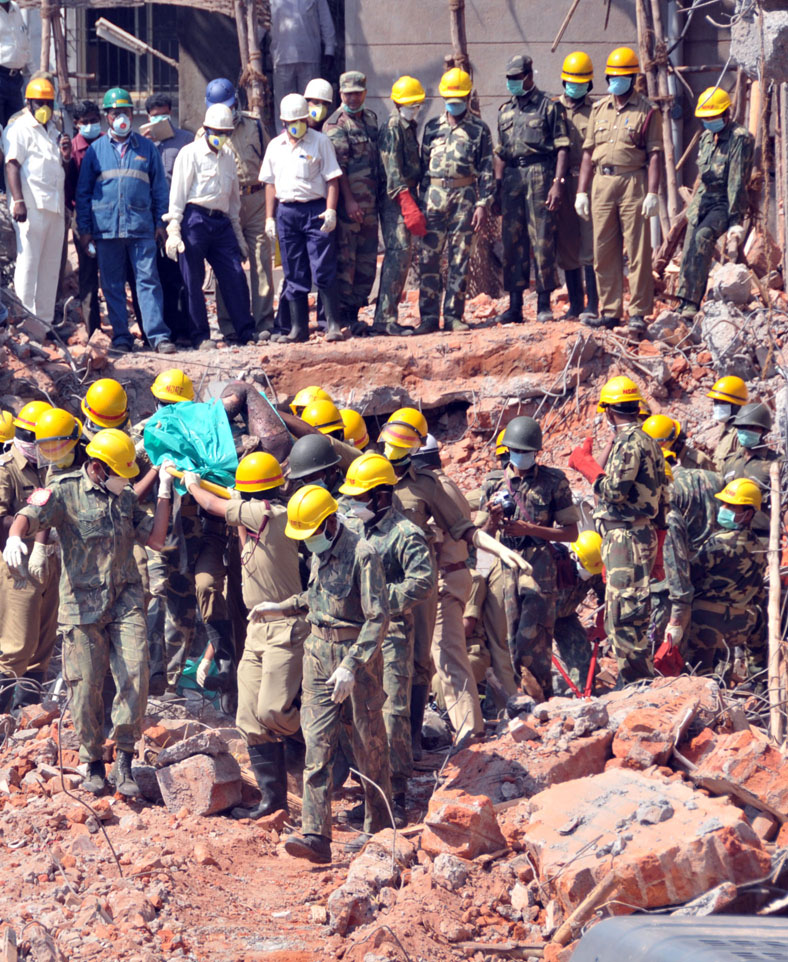
NDRF Response during a building collapse in Bellary, Karnataka, 2010

2020

- Gas leak in Visakhapatnam, Andhra Pradesh – 7 May 2020
- Cyclone Amphan in West Bengal

2021

- Glacial outburst flood in Uttarakhand – 7 February 2021
- Cyclone Yaas in Odisha and West Bengal

2023

- The NDRF teams were deployed in Assam to tackle the annual flood situation. The force carried out rescue operations, evacuating stranded people and providing them with essential relief materials.
- NDRF was instrumental in minimising the loss of life during the cyclone that hit Odisha. The force was involved in preemptive evacuations, search and rescue operations, and distribution of relief materials.
- The NDRF teams were quick to respond to the earthquake that struck Himachal Pradesh. They carried out search and rescue operations, helping to locate and save trapped individuals.
- The NDRF has been actively involved in rescue efforts in Bharuch district, specifically in Nikora Village. The force saved 105 people stranded in low-lying areas and relocated them to safety in collaboration with the civil administration. This operation was particularly challenging due to the water level being above the danger mark.

During the Kosi breach in Bihar in August 2008, which was declared a national calamity by Prime Minister Manmohan Singh, NDRF personnel actively engaged themselves in rescue operations and relief duties in districts Supaul, Madhepura, Araria and Purnia. About 780 NDRF personnel trained in flood rescue operations along with 153 high capacity inflatable boats and other rescue equipment were deployed in the flood affected areas. The swift and highly skilled operations of NDRF saved more than 100,000 people trapped in swirling waters of the Koshi River. NDRF personnel distributed relief supplies including drinking water to the stranded flood victims. Medical camps were also established to provide medical care to the flood affected people. Impressed with prompt and efficient response of NDRF, Chief Minister of Bihar Shri Nitish Kumar approached Prime Minister Shri Manmohan Singh for a NDRF Bn to be stationed in Bihar and offered 65 acres (26 ha) of land at Bihta near Patna.

NDRF commendable rescue operations were no less appreciated during the 2008 floods in Odisha, Maharashtra, Kerala and Assam.

On 25 May 2009 Cyclone Aila hit West Bengal. At least 94 people were killed, seven of them in Kolkata, over 4 million people were affected. More than six lakh houses were destroyed completely or damaged partially. NDRF promptly responded to the devastating situation and 600 personnel of NDRF with 84 boats and other rescue equipment started rescue and relief operations at cyclone affected areas of district 24 Pargana North and South of West Bengal. During the operations NDRF personnel rescued around 2000 trapped persons and distributed 50 truckloads of relief materials to the affected people.

On 1 October 2009, in the wake of worsening flood situations in the states of Andhra Pradesh and Karnataka, the governments of both states sent requests for deployment of the force for rescue and relief operations. NDMA mobilised 963 flood rescue trained personnel (including some deep divers) and 308 inflatable motorised boats from 05 NDRF Bns located at Arakkonam (Chennai), Pune, Mundali (Odisha), Greater Noida and Bhatinda and airlifted on 2–3 Oct 2009 in Air Force IL-76 and AN-32 aircraft from nearest Air Force bases and Civil Airports. The rescue personnel deployed in 04 districts of Andhra Pradesh (Kurnool, Vijayawada, Mehboob Nagar and Nandyal) and 04 districts of Karnataka (Bagalkote, Raichur, Gadag and Vijaypur) and immediately started rescue and relief operations in the flood affected districts of both the states.

NDRF rescued tens of thousands of persons marooned in the floods in these two states and distributed over 40 quintals of food and drinking water. The medical teams of NDRF administered medical first response and distributed medicines to the flood victims.

On 26 January 2010 a five-storey under-construction residential building collapsed at Bellary, Karnataka with about 50 people trapped under the debris. Three rescue teams (102 personnel) of NDRF Bn Pune promptly airlifted to Bellary and NDRF personnel carried out round the clock operation with the help of search & rescue equipment and dogs for nine days. In the operation the NDRF managed to rescue 20 people from under the debris. The last person was rescued on the 9th day. NDRF also retrieved 27 bodies trapped under debris.

== Training ==
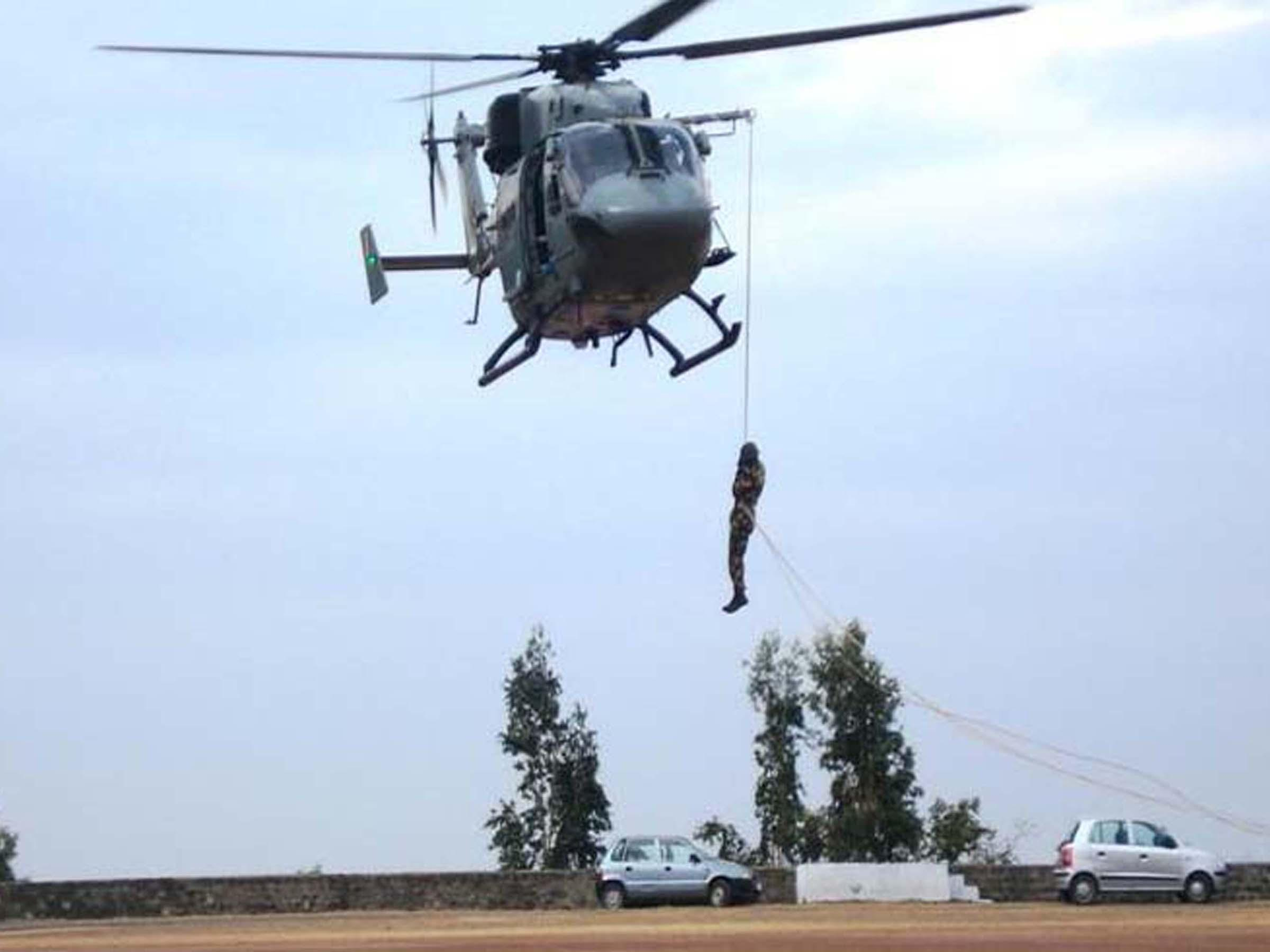
NDRF personnel undergoing Heli-slithering Training

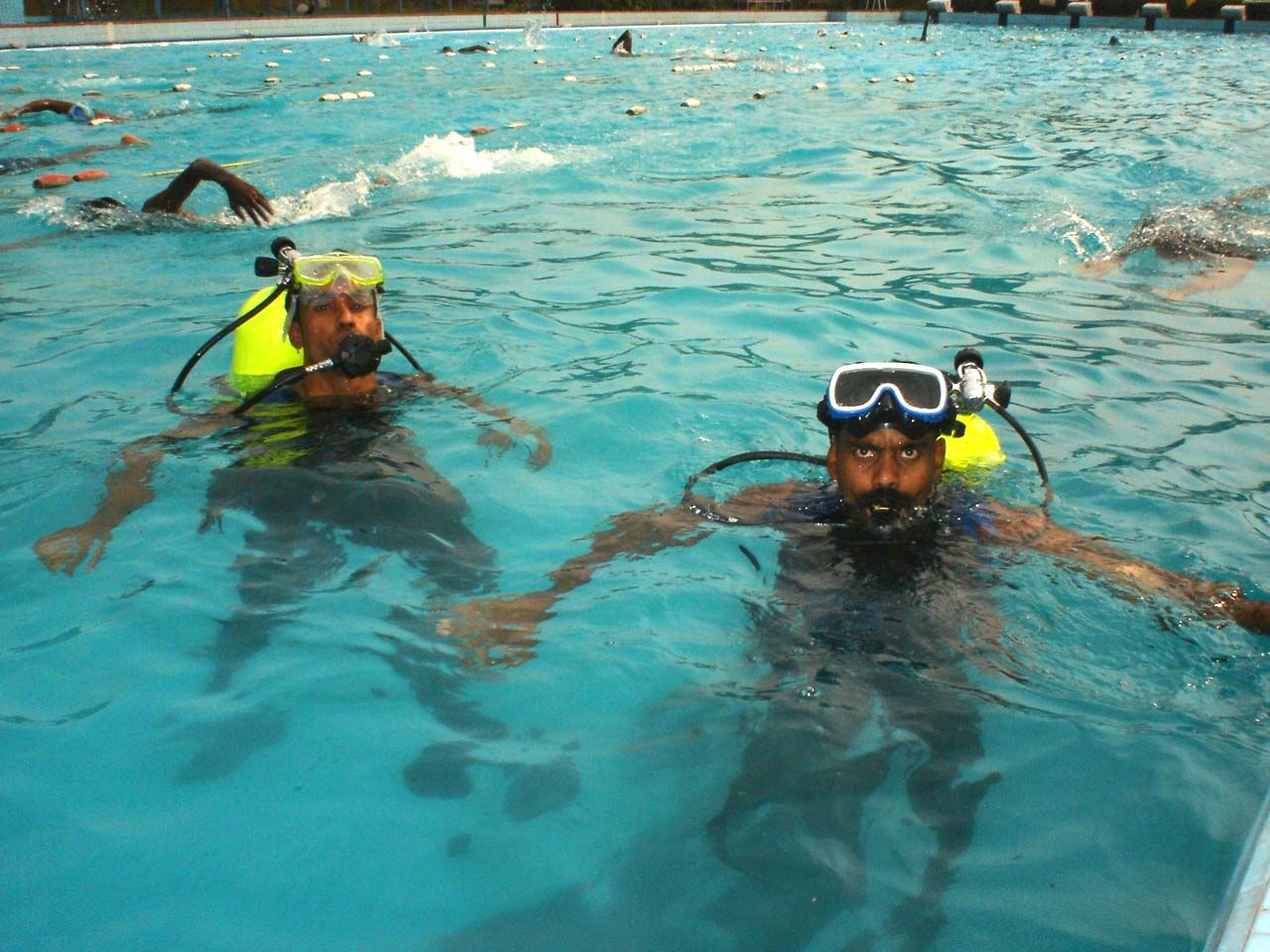
Flood Rescue Training

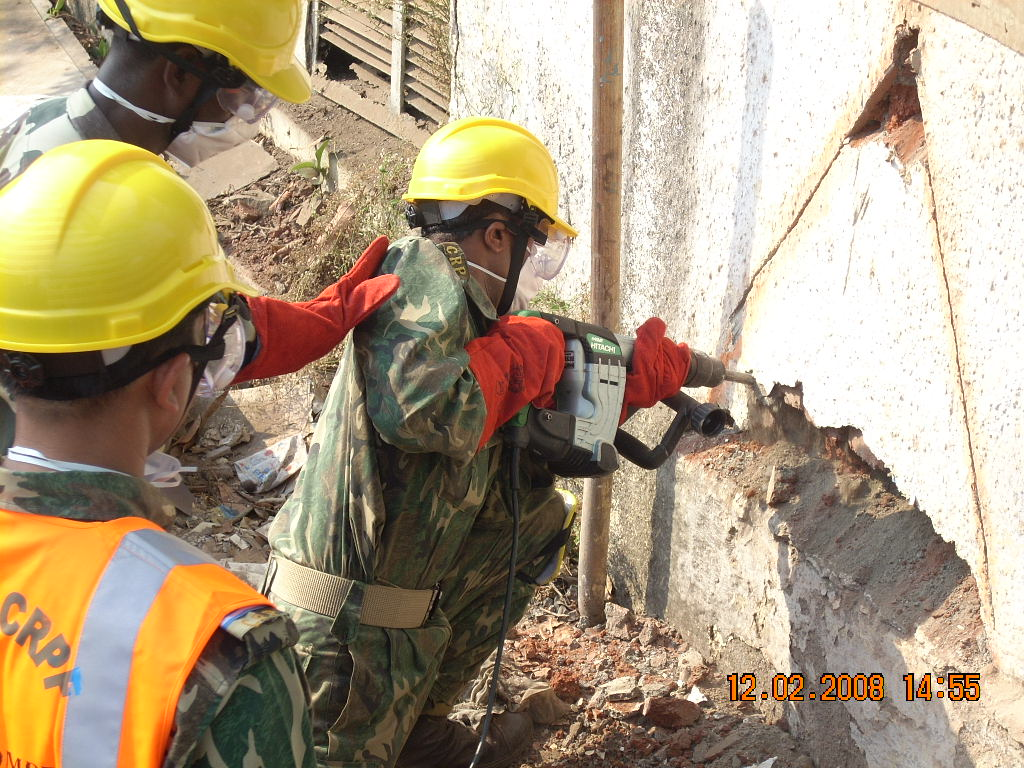
Search and Rescue Training

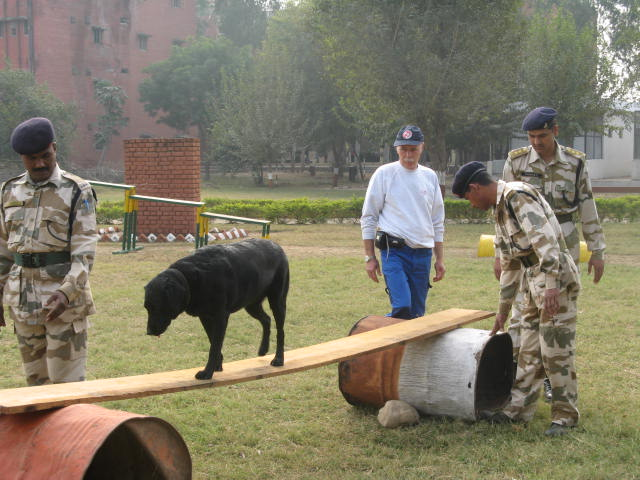
Training of Dogs by Swiss Experts

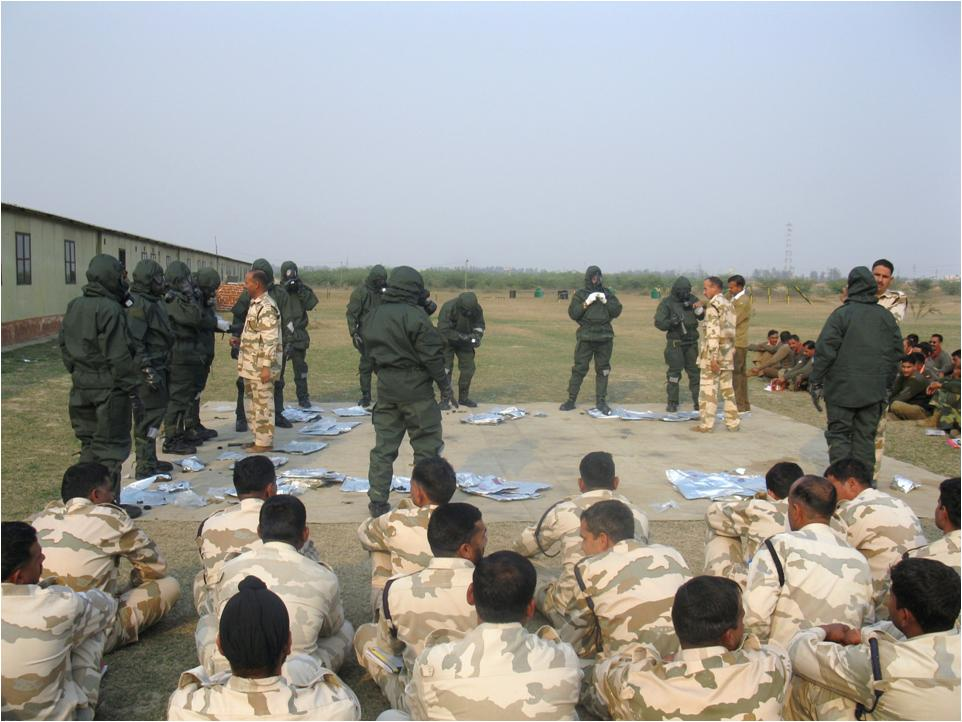
CBRN Training of NDRF Personnel

In the future, the key to efficient disaster response will depend primarily on the effectiveness of the training and re-training of Specialized Disaster Response Forces. With this vision, a detailed "Training Regime for Disaster Response" has been prepared by NDMA/NDRF identifying the specific disaster response training courses and devising a unified, structured and uniform course module as well as a syllabus for these training courses. The proposition behind a unified, structured, uniform course module and syllabus is that first the entire NDRF battalions will successfully attain these courses and subsequently the State Disaster Response Forces (SDRF) and other stakeholders will be trained on the same lines. The need for a uniformly structured course module emerged from the fact that if all the NDRF battalions and other ‘first responders’ undergo the same training exercise, the coordination between different stakeholders would be expedient and well planned at the time of any major disaster where different NDRF battalions, SDRF battalions and other stakeholders will be working together in close coordination with each other.

Established in 2005, the NDRF has conducted rescue operations in response to various disasters and emergencies. Its personnel are trained in courses including Flood Rescue, Collapsed Structure Search and Rescue, Medical First Responders, Rope Rescue, Nuclear, Biological and Chemical Emergencies and Dignified Disposal of Dead Bodies. NDRF personnel also receive training at institutions like NISA, DRDO, BARC, CME, Army, Navy, and Air Force as well as at institutions in other countries.

=== Training abroad ===
- INSARAG Asia-Pacific Exercise, China, 4–7 August 2006
- OPCW Chemical Emergency Course, Finland, 21–25 August 2006
- UNDAC Induction Course, Korea, 17–29 Sep 2006
- INSARAG Asia-Pacific Exercise, Mongolia, 31 July – 2 August 2007
- UNDAC Induction Course, Malaysia, 10–14 July 2007
- INSARAG Meeting, Korea, 3–6 Oct 2007
- UNDAC Induction Course, New Zealand, 14–16 Oct 2007
- INSARAG Asia-Pacific Exercise, Switzerland, 17–20 Nov 2008
- Management of Dead Bodies, Geneva, Switzerland, 4–8 Feb 2008
- Singapore Civil Defence Academy, Singapore, 10–27 March 2008
- INSARAG Asia-Pacific Exercise, Philippines, 15–17 April 2008
- APCSS, Honolulu, Hawaii, US, 29 May – 27 June 2008
- Advanced Search & Rescue Course, Florida, US, 1–5 Sep 2008
- Chemical Exercise, OPCW, Tehran, Iran, 1–5 Nov 2008
- INSARAG Asia-Pacific Exercise, Nepal, 21–24 April 2009
- APCSS, Honolulu, Hawaii, US, 20 Aug – 22 September 2009
- Bio-terrorism Table top Exercise, Montreux, Switzerland, 7–8 Sep 2009

=== Training of NDRF ===
While the NDRF is being trained, re-trained and equipped as a specialist force for level three disasters, it is equally important to ensure capacity building of state police personnel who are invariably the first responders in any natural or man-made disasters. To ensure this, a two-pronged strategy is being suggested to the states: firstly, to train state police personnel in the basics of disaster management and secondly, to train at least one battalion equivalent out of their state armed police units as State Disaster Response Force (SDRF) on lines of the NDRF. In addition to police personnel, the SDRFs may be constituted from existing resources of the Fire Services, Home Guards and Civil Defence. NDRF Bns and their training institutions will assist the States/UTs in this effort. The State/UTs will also be encouraged to set up DM training facilities in their respective Police Training Colleges and include this subject in their basic and in-service courses

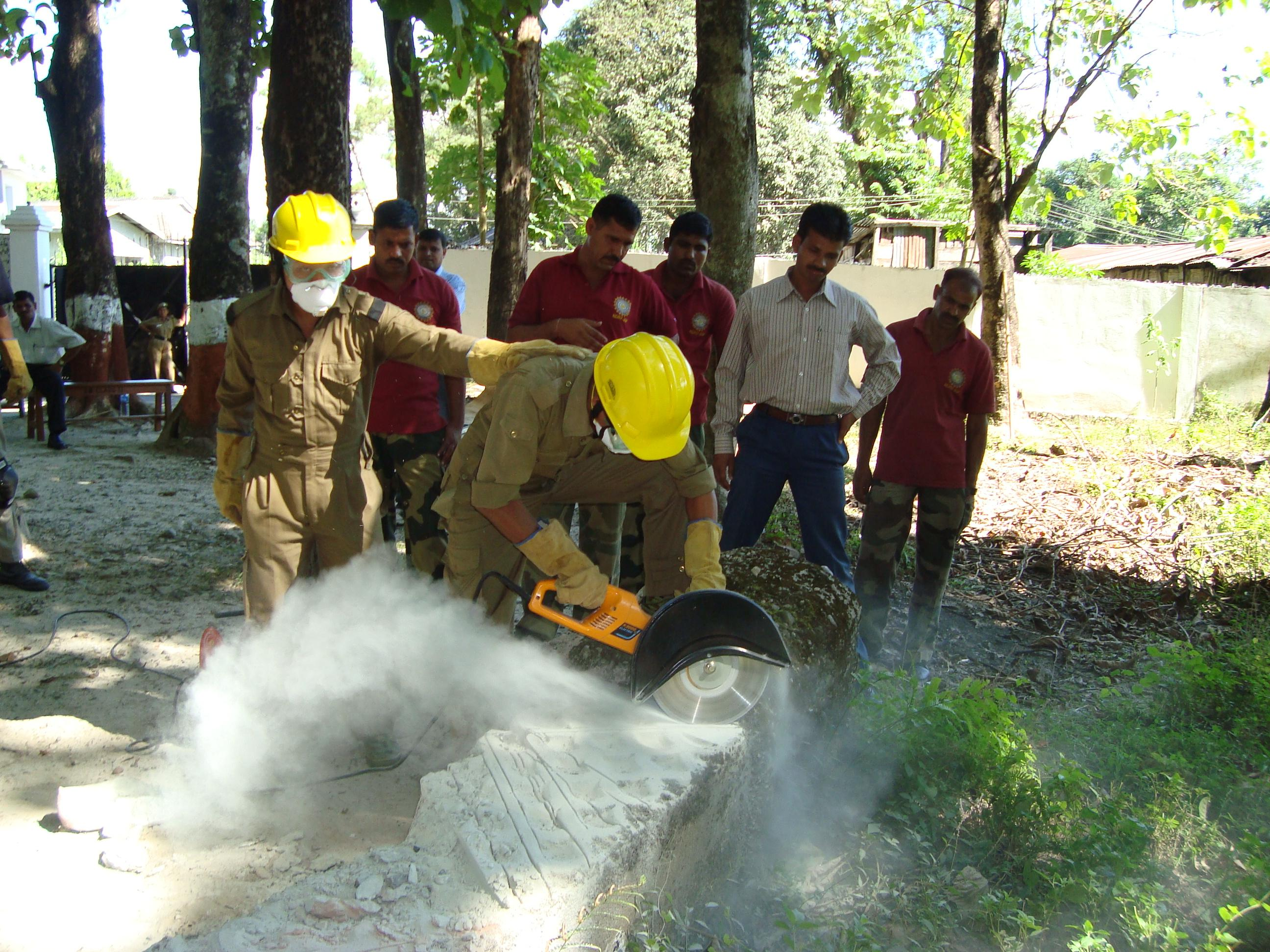
Search and Rescue Training

Training being one of the most important attributes for an efficient force, the Government of India has recognised the recommendations of the NDMA for setting up an apex National Institute of Excellence for Search and Rescue at a central place like Nagpur to provide training of trainers and to meet other national and international commitments. Also a network of 10 outreach centres at the respective NDRF Bns locations are proposed to be set up.

== Community-based disaster preparedness ==
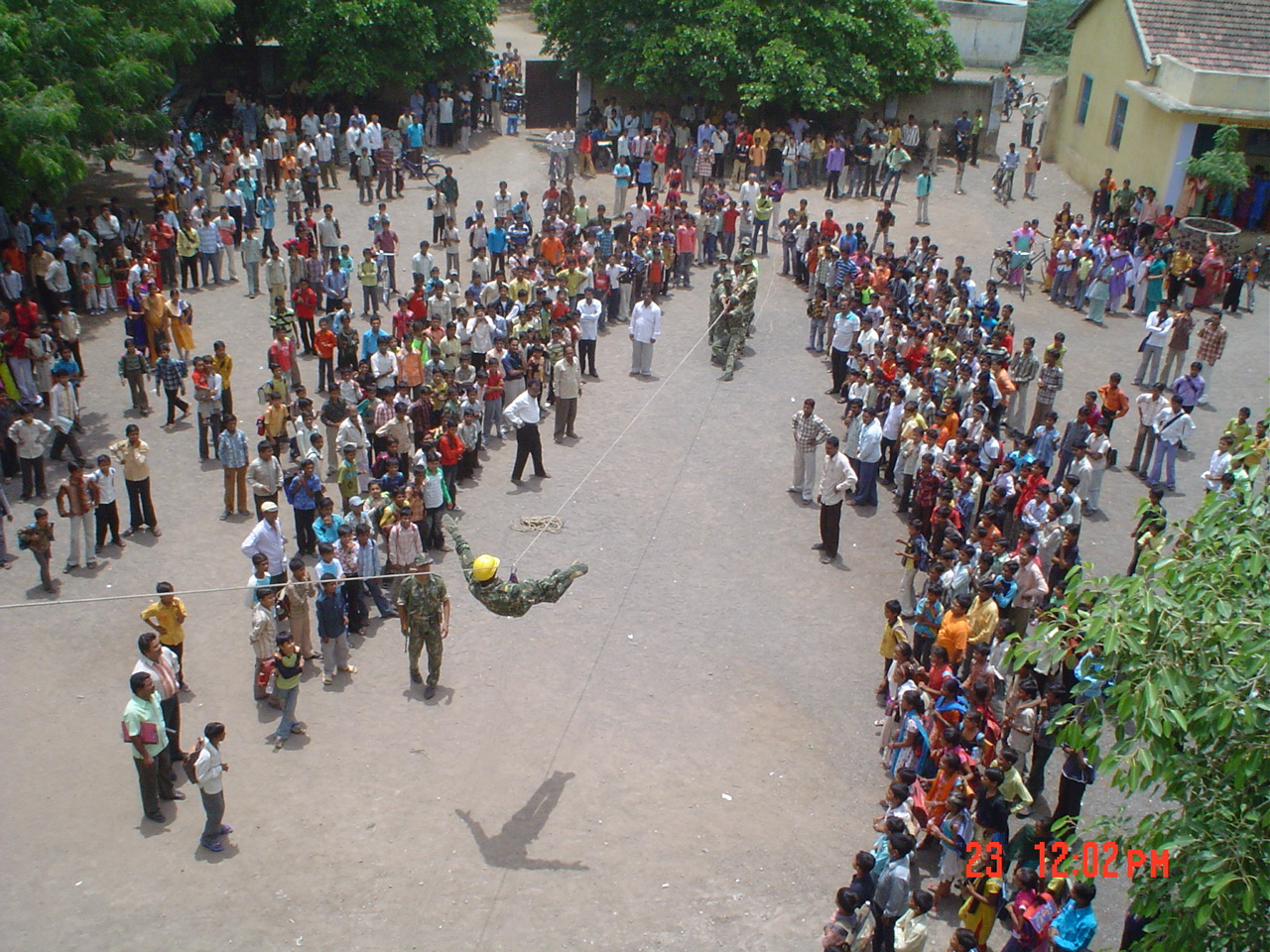
Demonstration of rope rescue techniques to villagers

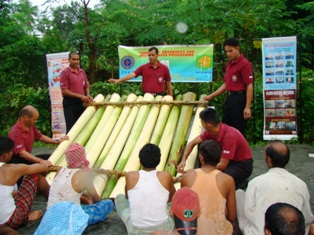
Making an improvised banana raft

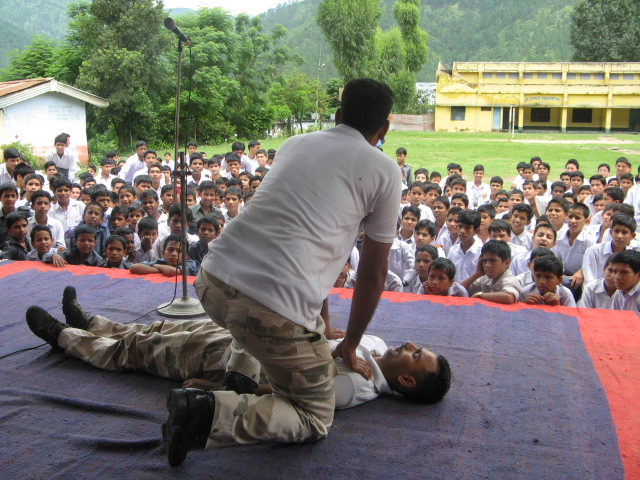
Demonstration of life-saving techniques to school children

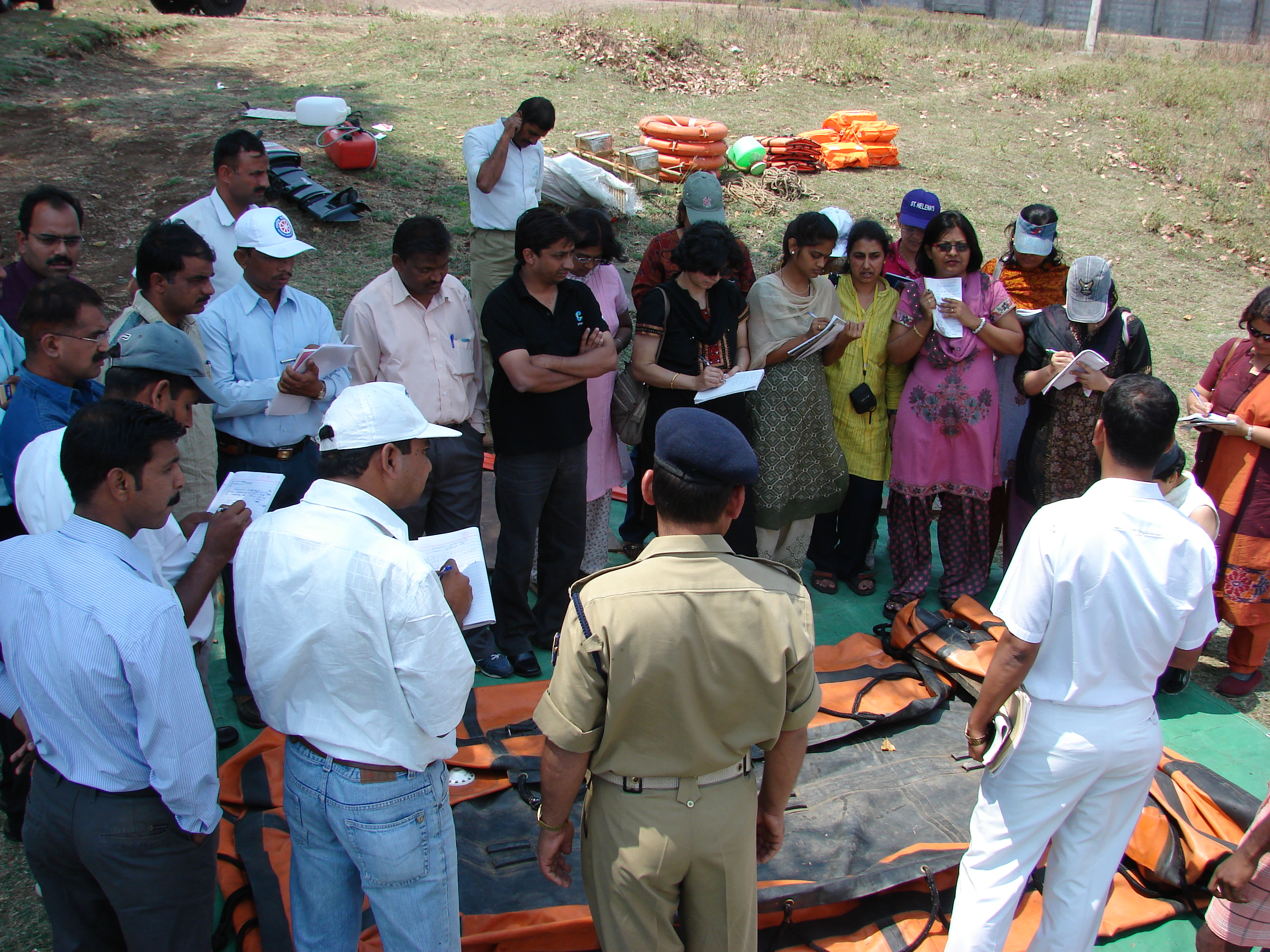
Training the teachers of Pune University

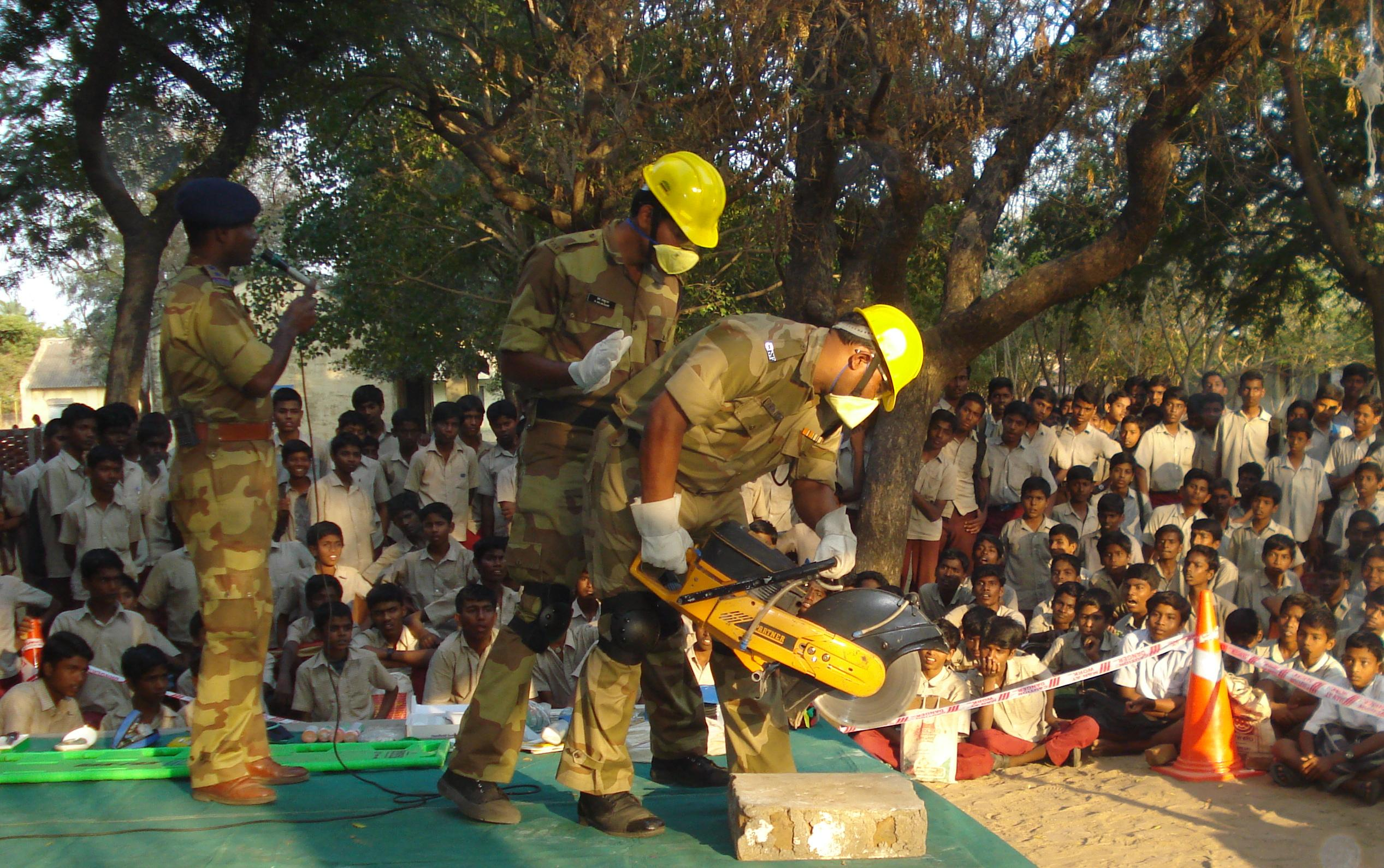
Capacity-building programme of NDRF

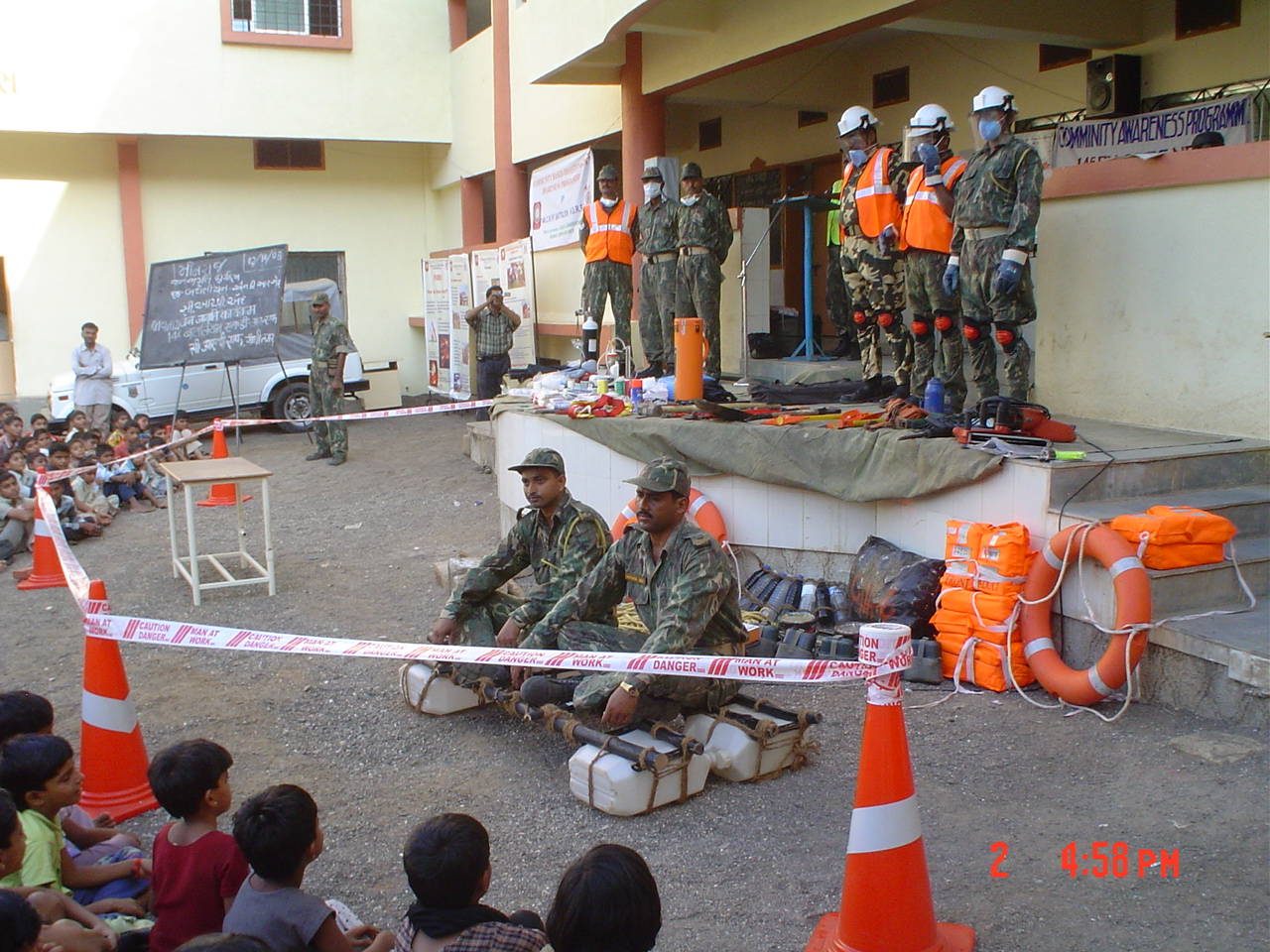
Capacity-building of school children

Awareness and preparedness campaigns are key components of proactive approach on disaster management. In case of any disaster, the local population is the actual first responder. It may take some time for the district or state administration to mobilise rescue teams, including police and fire personnel. If the local people is properly sensitised about the precautions and preventive actions to be taken in case of any calamity, the loss of life and damage to property can be drastically reduced. Thus, one of the most important tasks of NDRF is to continuously engage themselves in the community capacity building and public awareness programmes, which includes training of people (the first-responders) and concerned government officials at different levels in the areas with high vulnerability. Along with community capacity building and public awareness exercises, NDRF is also actively engaged in area familiarisation exercises. Such exercises provide first-hand knowledge about the topography, access route to various disaster-prone areas, and the availability of local infrastructure/logistics which can be used in disaster response operations. The force has trained almost 4 million volunteers.

A pilot project on community capacity building and public awareness campaigns on floods, earthquakes and other natural disasters was organised by NDRF teams during June–July 2007 in 14 high vulnerable districts (Araria, Saharsa, Kishanganj, Madhepura, Supaul, Khagaria, Begusarai, Darbhanga, Madhubani, Munger, Patna, Muzaffarpur, Sitamarhi and Samastipur) of Bihar. In this project, 2200 volunteers and State Disaster Management Authority (SDMA) officials were trained by the NDRF. This capacity building programme was continued next year also.

In 2008, NDRF embarked in a big way on community capacity building and public awareness programmes in Bihar, which included training of vulnerable people and officials in various districts. NDRF carried out three-day flood preparedness training programmes for a month in 15 vulnerable districts (Bhagalpur, East Champaran, Vaishali, Munger, Muzaffarpur, Saharsa, Madhepura, Khagaria, Begusarai, Darbhanga, Madhubani, Patna, Sitamarhi, Samastipur and Sheohar) of Bihar before monsoon season at district/Block levels. More than 15,000 village volunteers, local people, students, State Police, and also Central and State Government personnel participated in the programme.

NDRF also conducts regular mock exercises on various disasters like cyclone, flood, earthquake, NBC emergencies, mass casualty management etc. Participation in such exercises on the one hand improve the professionalism of NDRF personnel to tackle the real emergency situations and on the other provides an opportunity to interact with various State Government officials and to develop cordial relations with them that can be of great help during response to actual disasters.

As of 31 March 2010, NDRF had trained more than 6.5 lakh community volunteers throughout the country.

== Workshops and exhibitions ==
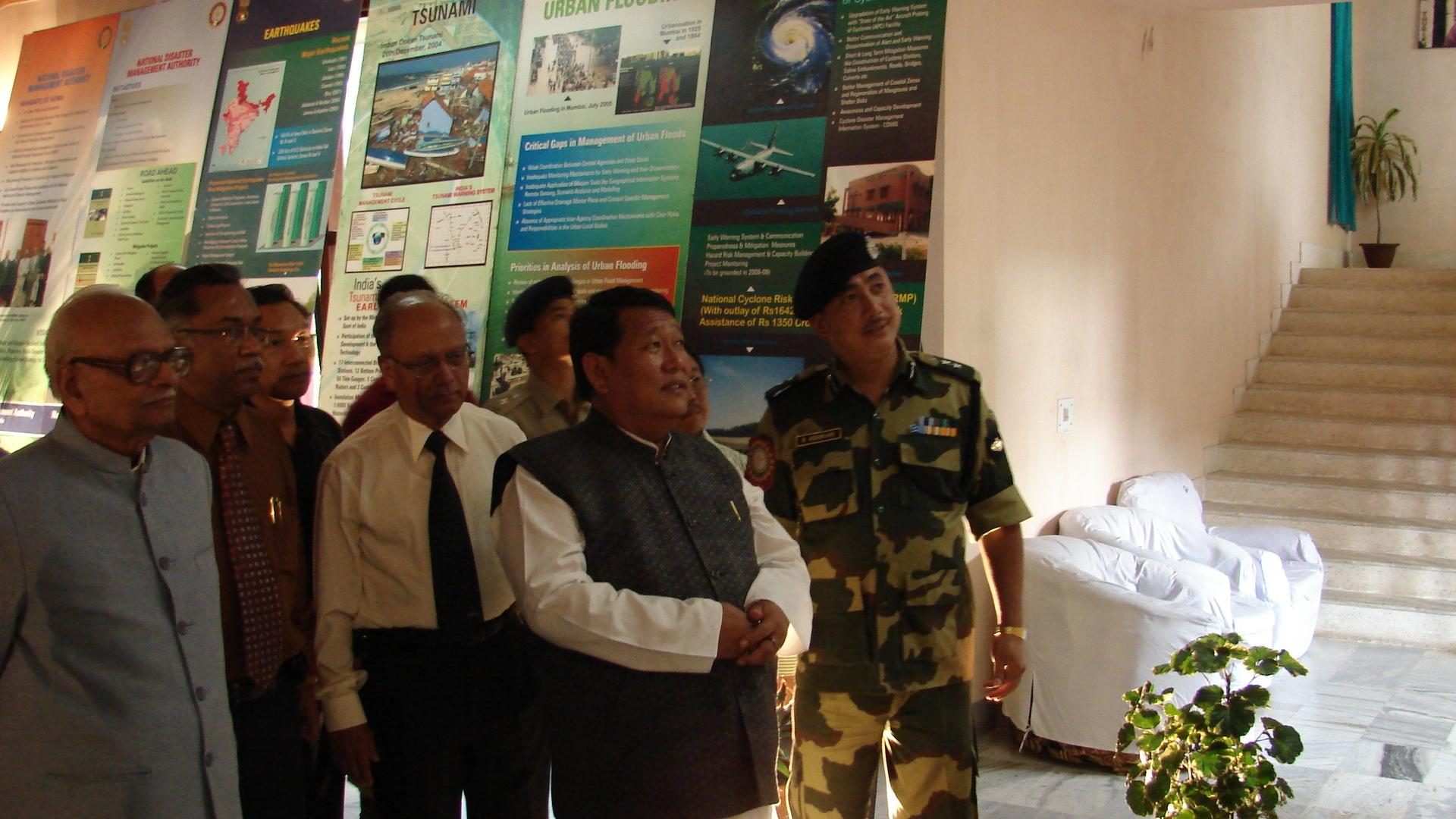
NDRF exhibition on disaster awareness at Arunachal Pradesh

NDRF Bn Pune put up an exhibition of International standard at TechFest 2010 (the annual International Science and Technology Festival of IIT Mumbai) and organised demonstrations on Heli-Rescue, Collapsed Structure Search & Rescue, High-Rise Building Rescue and Dog Show between 22 and 24 January 2010 aimed at generate awareness among the visitors.

TechFest 2010 was inaugurated by Gen N. C. Vij, Honourable vice-chairman, NDMA. This three-day event witnessed more than 70,000 visitors, 15,000 participants, nearly 2000 colleges and approximately 5000 members of Industry and academia. The force has put on numerous other exhibitions and promotional events.

== See also ==
- Indian Armed Forces
- Central Armed Police Forces
- National Disaster Management Authority (India)
- National Institute of Disaster Management, New Delhi
- State Disaster Response Force Assam
