= Cyclone Aila =

North Indian Ocean cyclone in 2009

Severe Cyclonic Storm Aila
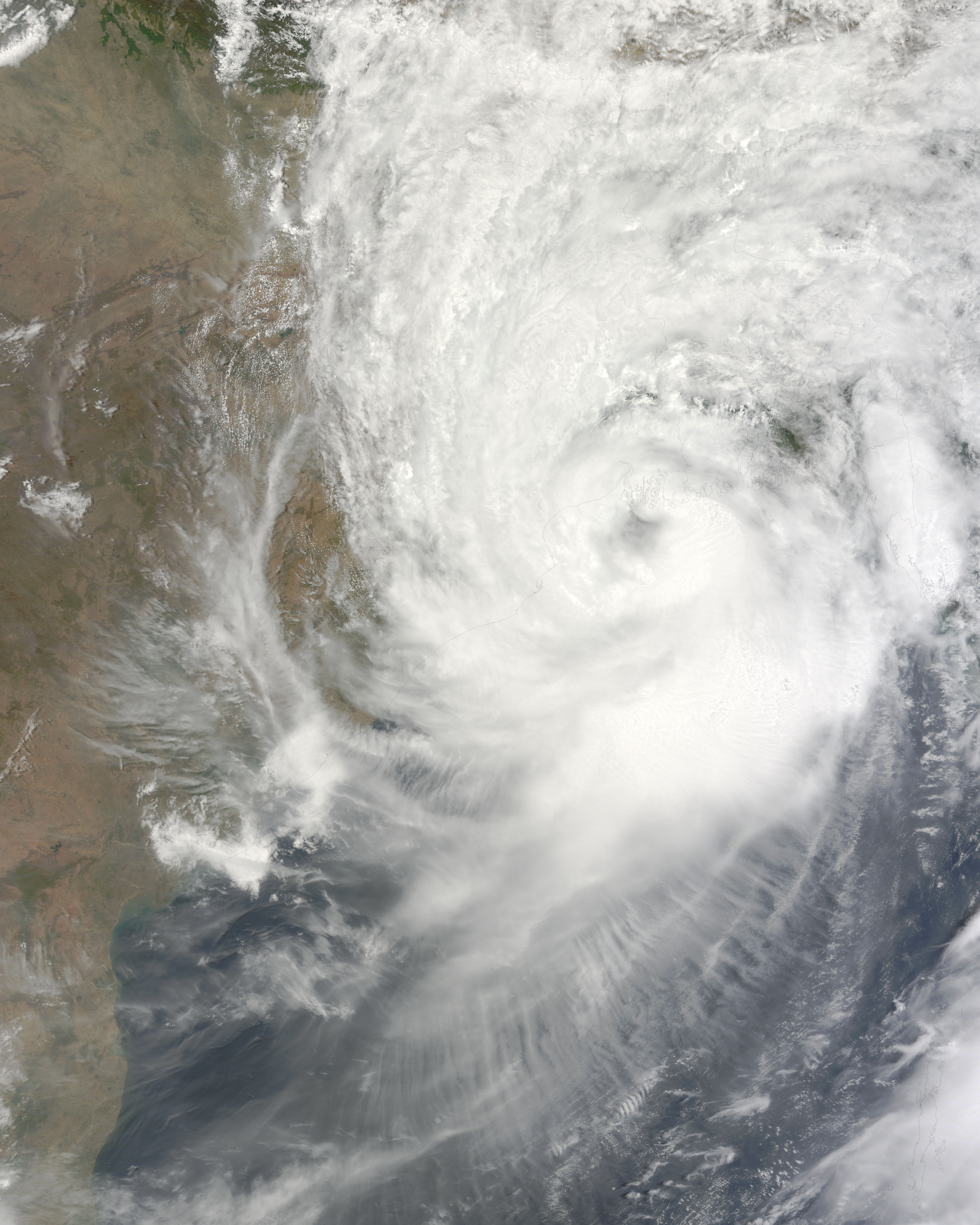
- Severe Cyclonic Storm Aila at peak intensity

Meteorological history
- Formed: May 25, 2009
- Dissipated: May 27, 2009

Severe cyclonic storm
- 3-minute sustained (IMD)
- Highest winds: 110 km/h (70 mph)
- Lowest pressure: 968 hPa (mbar); 28.59 inHg

Category 1-equivalent tropical cyclone
- 1-minute sustained (SSHWS/JTWC)
- Highest winds: 120 km/h (75 mph)

Overall effects
- Fatalities: 339 total
- Damage: $1.83 billion (2009 USD)
- Areas affected: Bangladesh and India
- IBTrACS
- Part of the 2009 North Indian Ocean cyclone season

Severe Cyclonic Storm Aila (Note: The name Aila (Dhivehi: އައިލަ; [ʔai.la]) was contributed by the Maldives and refers to the pompano dolphinfish (Coryphaena equiselis) in Dhivehi.) (JTWC designation: 02B) was the second named tropical cyclone of the 2009 North Indian Ocean cyclone season. Warned by both the Regional Specialized Meteorological Center (RSMC) and Joint Typhoon Warning Center (JTWC), Aila formed over a disturbance over the Bay of Bengal on May 23, 2009 and started to intensify, reaching sustained wind speeds of 110 kmh (70 mph). It was the worst natural disaster to affect Bangladesh since Cyclone Sidr in November 2007. A relatively strong tropical cyclone, it caused extensive damage in Bangladesh and India.

The storm was responsible for at least 339 deaths across Bangladesh and India; more than 1 million people were left homeless. Health officials in Bangladesh confirmed a deadly outbreak of diarrhea on 29 May, with more than 7,000 people being infected and four dying. In Bangladesh, an estimated 20 million people were at risk of post-disaster diseases due to Aila.

== Meteorological history ==
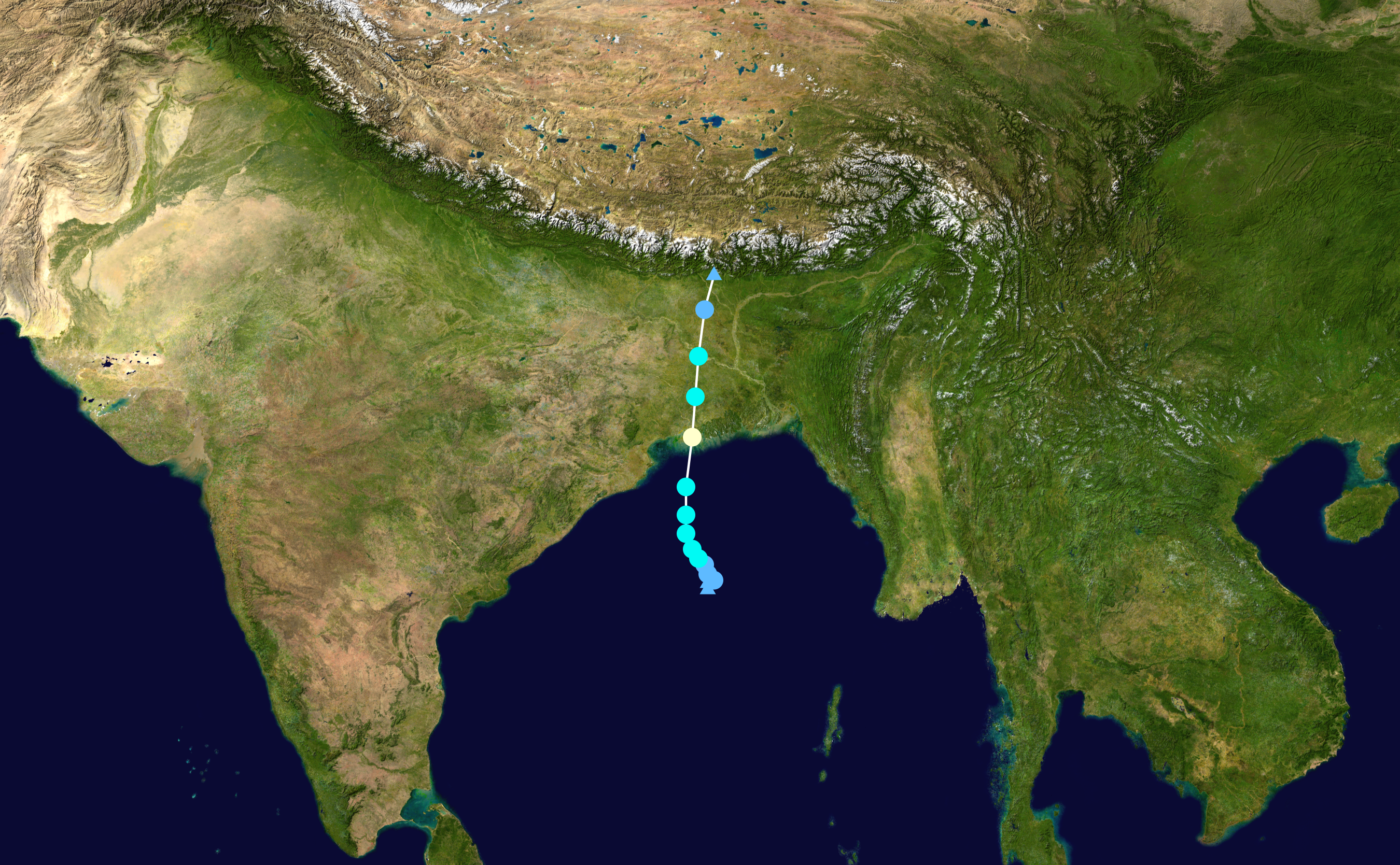
Map plotting the storm's track and intensity, according to the Saffir–Simpson scale Map key Saffir–Simpson scale Tropical depression (≤38 mph, ≤62 km/h) Tropical storm (39–73 mph, 63–118 km/h) Category 1 (74–95 mph, 119–153 km/h) Category 2 (96–110 mph, 154–177 km/h) Category 3 (111–129 mph, 178–208 km/h) Category 4 (130–156 mph, 209–251 km/h) Category 5 (≥157 mph, ≥252 km/h) Unknown Storm type Tropical cyclone Subtropical cyclone Extratropical cyclone, remnant low, tropical disturbance, or monsoon depression

Late on May 21, 2009, the Joint Typhoon Warning Center reported that a tropical disturbance had persisted about 950 kilometres (590 mi) to the south of Kolkata, in India and had developed within the Southwest Monsoon. The disturbance at this time had a broad and poorly organized area of deep convection, which was located to the southeast of the low level circulation center which had consolidated into a single circulation during the previous 12 hours. Environmental analysis indicated that the system was in an area of favorable conditions to develop with low vertical wind shear and warm sea surface temperatures. During May 22, 2009, the disturbance developed further with a Tropical Cyclone a Cyclonic storm and had been named as Aila whilst located about 350 kilometres (220 mi) to the southeast of Sagar Island. Aila became a severe cyclonic storm at 06UTC on May 25 and made landfall at its peak intensity (60kt, 967hPa) between 08 and 09UTC.

== Preparations ==
Officials in India evacuated thousands of residents from coastal areas ahead of Cyclone Aila. In addition, several warning alerts were issued before the cyclone hit Kolkata; however, no alarm bells were rung.

In the Bhola District of Bangladesh, an estimated 500,000 people evacuated to higher areas and shelters as Aila neared landfall. Tourists were advised to stay in their hotels due to the short amount of time to prepare for the storm.

== Impact ==
=== India ===
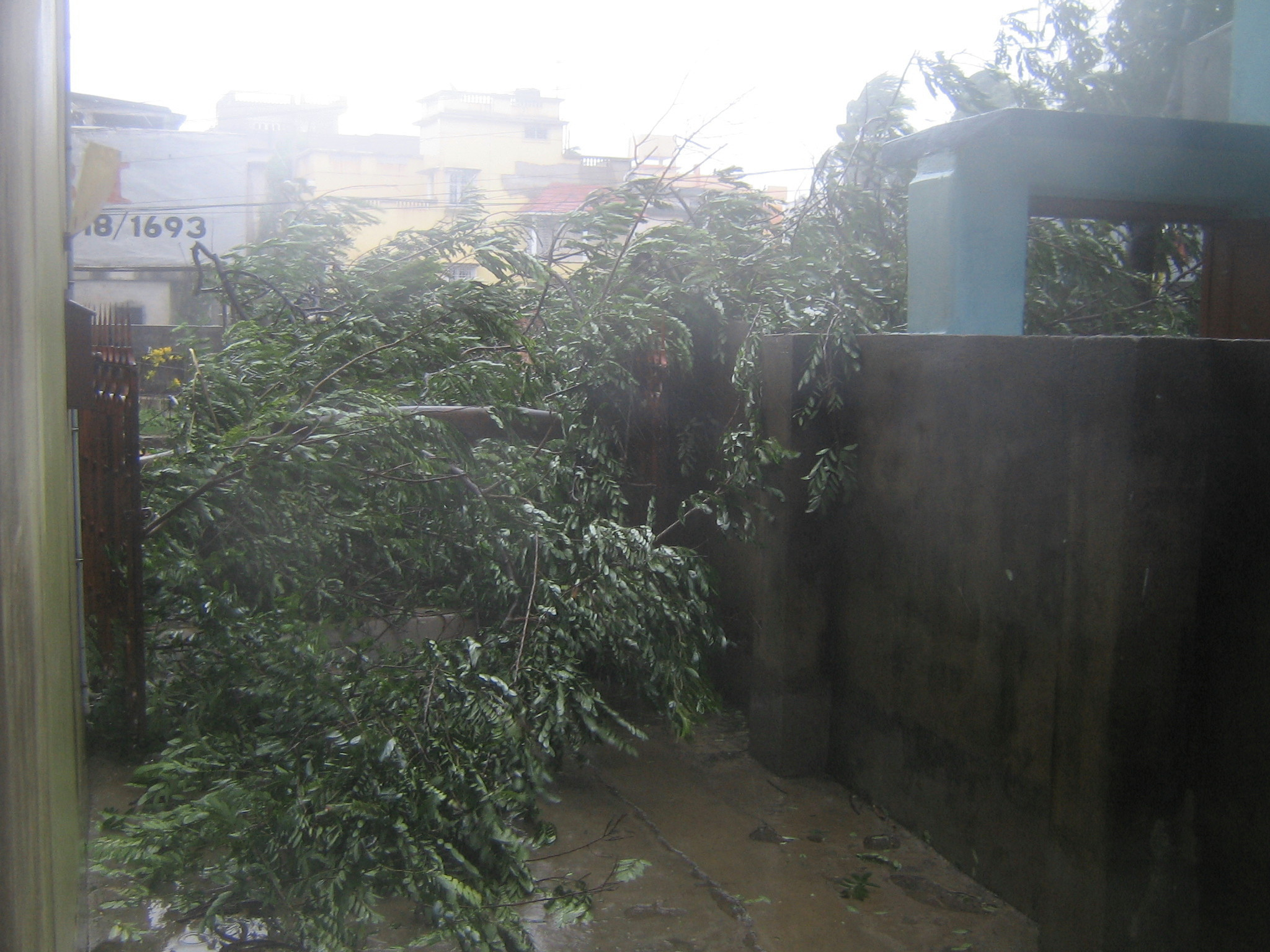
Aila downed thousands of trees, like this one.

In India, at least 149 people were killed, two by electrocution. Upwards of 2.3 million were displaced by the storm as 175,000 homes were destroyed and 270,000 were damaged. High winds uprooted numerous trees, blocking roads throughout the region. More than 15,000 people in eight villages were reportedly isolated from relief crews by severe flooding.

In West Bengal there were 45 fatalities, with at least 18 in Kolkata, the region where Aila made landfall. All transit systems in the city of Kolkata were halted due to the storm. The areas and districts affected by the cyclone in West Bengal include East Midnapore, Howrah, Hooghly, Burdwan, South 24 Parganas and Kolkata. Over 100,000 people were made homeless in West Bengal with an estimated 61,000 homes destroyed and 132,000 damaged. Damages statewide was Rs.18 billion (US$380 million) including at least 126,000 ha (310,000 acres) of agricultural land. In northern areas of the state, heavy rains triggered numerous landslides in Darjeeling that killed 22 people and left 6 others missing.

The outer bands of the storm also produced torrential rains and high winds in eastern portions of Orissa state, with the heaviest rainfall being recorded at Paradip at 260 mm (10 in) and winds peaked at 90 km/h (56 mph). Numerous trees were uprooted and power lines were downed, causing widespread power outages. High waves produced by the storm inundated coastal villages, forcing residents to evacuate to safer areas. Roads were also blocked by floodwaters or debris, hampering relief efforts. An estimated 1,000 acres (4.0 km^{2}) of Orissa cropland were lost due to Aila.

The remnants of Aila produced gusty winds and heavy rains in the eastern Indian state of Meghalaya between May 25 and 26. Rainfall amounts peaked at 213.4 mm (8.40 in) and winds reached 60 km/h (37 mph). Several homes were damaged in the area and power was cut due to fallen trees and power lines. No injuries were reported in the state. Several streets were flooded and some homes were reported to have standing water.

=== Bangladesh ===
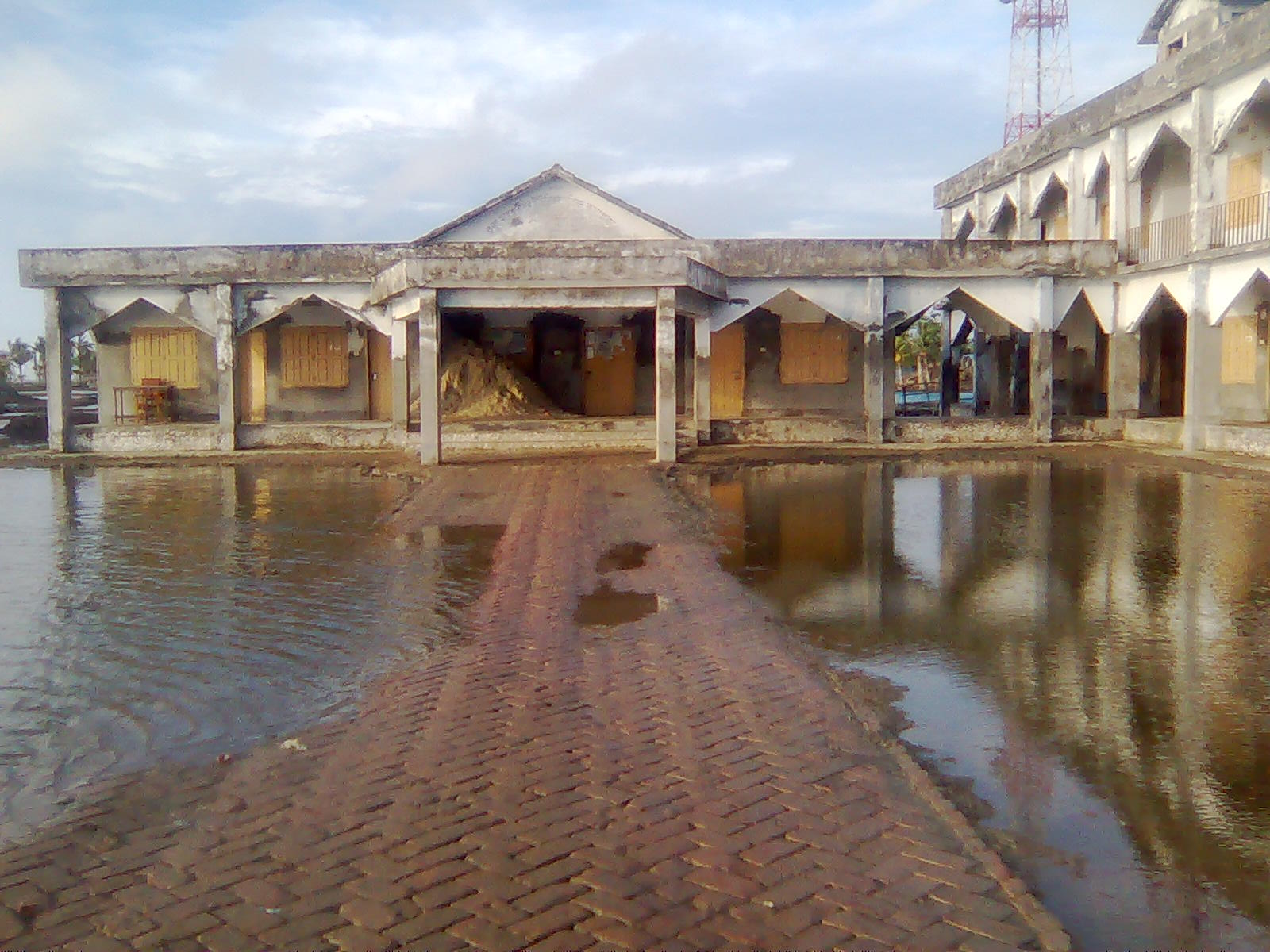
Affected area in Bangladesh

Torrential rains from Aila resulted in 190 fatalities and at least 7,000 injuries across the Khulna and Satkhira Districts. Across 11 of the nation's 64 districts, approximately 600,000 thatched homes, 8,800 km (5,500 mi) of roads, 1,000 km (620 mi) of embankments, and 123,000 hectares (300,000 acres) of land were damaged or destroyed. Approximately 9.3 million people were affected by the cyclone, of which 1 million were rendered homeless. One year after the storm, 200,000 people remained homeless. Damage in Koyra Upazila amounted to Tk.100 billion (US$1.45 billion).

More than 400,000 people were reportedly isolated by severe flooding in coastal regions of Bangladesh. Numerous villages were either completely submerged in floodwaters or destroyed. Dozens of people were reportedly missing throughout the country. A storm surge of 3 m (10 ft) impacted western regions of Bangladesh, submerging numerous villages. Several rivers broke through embankments, causing widespread inland flooding: In Khulna Division, approximately 594 km of river embankment was damaged during Aila, increasing the length of flooding and resulting in agricultural loss of shrimp farms. In Dacope Upazila alone, more than 50,000 people were left homeless. Despite warnings to remain at port, numerous fishing vessels sailed into the storm. Port officials stated that more than 500 fishermen had gone missing since the storm made landfall. In Patuakhali, a dam broke and submerged five villages. Numerous houses were destroyed by the subsequent flooding and tens of thousands of people were left stranded in the villages. In Chandpur, two pontoons sank while docked in port. An estimated 58,950 animals were killed by the storm with up to 50,000 deer missing. On the island of Nizum Dwip, nearly all structures were severely damaged or destroyed, leaving roughly 20,000 people homeless.

=== Environmental impact ===
The Sunderbans, a region which houses 265 of the endangered Bengal tigers, was inundated with 6.1 m (20 ft) of water. Dozens of the tigers were feared to have drowned in Aila's storm surge along with deer and crocodiles. As of 27 May 2009, one tiger was found alive in a waterlogged cowshed following the cyclone's landfall. Additionally the forest remained under an estimated 2.4 m (7.9 ft) of water. On 27 May, conservationists began a search for the tigers throughout the forest. The search teams were supplied with fresh drinking water for the tigers as their natural water source was inundated with salt water from Aila's storm surge.

== Government response ==
=== India ===
State Government of West Bengal in co-operation with the central counterparts took up the rescue and the rehabilitation program. Army was deployed to the affected areas. The next day, the army used helicopters to provide food to the affected population. About 2,500 troops were deployed to West Bengal on May 26, 2009. Several naval relief teams were deployed to the Sunderbans region where an estimated 400,000 people were marooned by flooding. Roughly 100 relief camps were established in West Bengal shortly after the storm passed. On 27 May, 400 troops form the National Disaster Response Force were deployed to the state for relief operations. The state government released Rs.15 million (US$317,000) in relief funds to the affected areas on 26 May. Two MI-17 helicopters were also sent to air-drop food supplies to the worst affected areas in West Bengal.

=== Bangladesh ===
Immediately following the storm, a 33-member team of the Bangladesh Navy was deployed to the affected regions. The Red Cross also quickly responded, supplying water purifying tablets and other relief items. The Deputy Commissioner of Satkhira district allocated ten tonnes of rice and Tk.100,000 (US$1,450) in immediate relief funds for that district. The government later allocated Tk. 1.2 million (US$17,143) and 1,000 tonnes of rice for the affected areas. These amounts further increased to Tk. 12.3 million (US$175,714) and 2,500 tonnes of rice.

Five days following the impacts of Aila, the Bangladeshi Health Organization confirmed that a widespread outbreak of diarrhea which has infected over 7,000 people. Another outbreak of water borne diseases, namely dysentery, has infected over 3,000 people. At least two people have been confirmed to have died from diarrhea and two other fatalities were reported. Officials feared that the outbreak would lead to many fatalities in isolated areas that have not received aid and have been without food and clean water for nearly a week.

In comparison to earlier cyclones, that of similar magnitude, Cyclone Aila caused lower death toll due to implementation of efficient early warning systems, cyclone shelters and disaster relief allocation system. The Government of Bangladesh was praised domestically and internationally for its implementation of effective disaster management projects that have reduced death tolls in Cyclone Aila and future cyclones that have struck the country it since. Cyclone Aila has been described as a benchmark of Bangladesh's success in implementation of effective disaster management system. The joint effort of the Government and NGOs to support the post-disaster recovery was also remarkable but criticized due to lack of comprehensive inclusion of pre-disaster vulnerability reduction measures.

== See also ==
- 2009 North Indian Ocean cyclone season
- Cyclone Mora – a strong tropical cyclone in May 2017 that devastated Bangladesh and neighbouring countries.
