= National Institute of Disaster Management (India) =

Research institution in India

National Institute of Disaster Management (NIDM)
- Motto: Resilient India - Disaster free India
- Established: 1995
- Mission: To work as consulting agency for the Government by providing assistance in policy formulation and; To facilitate in reducing the impact of disasters through its technological innovations.
- President: Home Minister of India
- Executive Director: Shri Madhup Vyas, IAS 2000 batch
- Faculty: 16
- Staff: 22
- Owner: Ministry of Home Affairs, Government of India
- Formerly called: National Centre for Disaster Management (Upgraded to present status on 16 October 2003 )
- Location: India
- Website: www.nidm.gov.in

National Institute of Disaster Management (NIDM) is an Indian education and research institution located in [[Plot No. 15, Pocket-3, Block-B, Sector-29, Rohini, Delhi – 110042, New Delhi]]. NIDM is primarily responsible for the training and capacity development programs for managing natural disasters in India.

It was constituted under an Act of Parliament in 1995; was re-designated to give the present name of National Institute of Disaster Management (NIDM) by the Disaster Management Act 2005 assented to by the President of India on 9 January 2006.

== History ==
The International Decade for Natural Disaster Reduction, proposed with the purpose of ensuring the implementation of the International Strategy for Disaster Reduction prompted the Indian Institute of Public Administration (IIPA) under the Ministry of Agriculture and Cooperation, the nodal ministry for disaster management in India to establish a national centre for management and planning the control of such natural disasters in 1995.

The centre was later upgraded as the National Institute of Disaster management (NIDM) on 16 October 2003, with the transfer of responsibility for disaster management to the Ministry of Home Affairs. The institute was inaugurated by the Home Minister on 11 August 2004.

== Responsibilities ==
The National Disaster Management Act of 2005 granted the institute statutory organisation status. The Act holds the institute responsible for "planning and promoting training and research in the area of disaster management, documentation and development of national level information base relating to disaster management policies, prevention mechanisms and mitigation measures".

The NIDM has been mandated to be a deemed university and institute of excellence in learning and capacity building. NIDM has worked with other organisations to develop a model curriculum for strengthening disaster management in higher education and research. Most central universities have envisaged the operation of Centres for Disaster Management under their School of Environmental Studies.

=== Training ===
NIDM works under the government's directives to train and conduct periodic checks to regulate effective earthquake and disaster control policies throughout the country with support from semi-government, private firms and non-government organisations. It also conducts mock drills, crisis communication training and hazard hunt exercises every two to three months. In 2012 Delhi witnessed one of the biggest mock drills conducted in India, simulating an earthquake of magnitude 7.2 on the Richter Scale. The main purpose was to check the alertness and preparedness of various agencies, commuters and residents in the event of a disaster of such magnitude.
The National Disaster Management Authority and Delhi Disaster Management Authority jointly conducted the drills at several places across the national capital.

== See also ==
- National Disaster Management Authority (India)
- National Disaster Response Force
