= Piyush Anand =

Director General of the National Disaster Response Force

Director General of National Disaster Response Force
- Incumbent
- Assumed office 1 April 2024
- Preceded by: Atul Karwal

Personal details
- Born: 18 June 1968 (age 58) Delhi, India
- Parent: Anand KR. Agarwal (father)
- Education: IIT Delhi; MDI, Gurgaon
- Occupation: IPS officer
- Profession: Civil servant
- Awards: Indian Police Medal awarded by the central government for Meritorious Service President's Police Medal for Distinguished Service

Piyush Anand (born 18 June 1968) is a 1991-batch Indian Police Service (IPS) officer from the Uttar Pradesh cadre. Since 1 April 2024, he has served as the Director General of the National Disaster Response Force of India.

== Early life ==
Anand was born to Anand Kr. Agarwal in 1968, he is from Delhi, India.

== Education ==
Anand has completed M. Tech in (Mechanical engineering) from IIT Delhi. He also holds a Post Graduate Diploma in Public Policy & Management from MDI Gurgaon.

== Career ==
Before his appointment as Director General of the National Disaster Response Force(NDRF), Anand served in various roles in the Uttar Pradesh cadre, including postings as Superintendent of Police in several districts, as well as Inspector General of the Moradabad and Kanpur ranges.

He later held senior positions as Additional Director General (Establishment) and Additional Director General (Railways) with the Uttar Pradesh Police. At the central level, he worked with the Central Bureau of Investigation for over seven years and with the Central Reserve Police Force for over three years. He also served in the Central Industrial Security Force(CRPF) as Additional Director General and subsequently as Special Director General. Anand took charge as Director General of the National Disaster Response Force on 1 April 2024.

== Awards ==
Anand has received several awards, including;

- Indian Police Medal awarded by the central government for Meritorious Service.
- President's Police Medal for Distinguished Service.
- Gold Medal by School of Public Policy & Management, MDI Gurgaon for outstanding performance.
- Silver in 2018, Gold in 2019, Platinum in 2020, and Kumbh Sewa Medal in 2019. He has also been awarded DG's CRPF Commendation Disc in 2017.
