= National Disaster Management Authority (India) =

Government body in India

National Disaster Management Authority (NDMA)

Agency overview
- Formed: 23 December 2005; 20 years ago
- Jurisdiction: Government of India
- Headquarters: NDMA Bhavan, Safdarjung Enclave, New Delhi
- Annual budget: ₹3.56 billion (US$37 million) (Planned, 2013–14)
- Agency executive: Prime Minister
- Website: www.ndma.gov.in

National Disaster Management Authority (India), abbreviated as NDMA, is an apex body of Government of India, with a mandate to lay down policies for disaster management. NDMA was established through the Disaster Management Act enacted by the Government of India on 23 December 2005. NDMA is responsible for framing policies, laying down guidelines and best-practices for coordinating with the State Disaster Management Authorities (SDMAs) to ensure a holistic and distributed approach to disaster management.

== Background ==
The phrase disaster management is to be understood as a continuous and integrated process of planning, organising, coordinating, and implementing measures, which are necessary or expedient for the prevention of danger or threat of any disaster mitigation or reduction of risk of any disaster or severity of its consequences, capacity building, preparedness to deal with any disaster, prompt response, assessing the severity or magnitude of effects of any disaster, evacuation, rescue, relief, rehabilitation and reconstruction'.

== Members ==
It is headed by the Prime Minister of India and can have up to nine other members. Since 2024, there have been three members. They are: Rajendra Singh, Lt. Gen (Retd) Syed Ata Hasnain and Dr. Krishna Vatsa. Currently, Rajendra Singh is the Head of Department of NDMA. There is a provision to have a Vice Chair-person of NDMA also.

== Vision ==
NDMA has a vision to "build a safer and disaster resilient India by a holistic, pro-active, technology-driven and sustainable development strategy that involves all stakeholders and fosters a culture of prevention, preparedness and mitigation."

== Functions and responsibilities ==
NDMA, as the apex body, is mandated to lay down the policies, plans and guidelines for Disaster Management to ensure timely and effective response to disasters. Towards this, it has the following responsibilities:

- Lay down policies on disaster management;
- Approves the National Plan;
- Approve plans prepared by the Ministries or Departments of the Government of India in accordance with the National Plan;
- Lay down guidelines to be followed by the State Authorities in drawing up the State Plan;
- Lay down guidelines to be followed by the different Ministries or Departments of the Government of India for the purpose of integrating the measures for prevention of disaster or the mitigation of its effects in their development plans and projects;
- Coordinate the enforcement and implementation of the policy and plans for disaster management;
- Recommend provision of funds for the purpose of mitigation;
- Provide such support to other countries affected by major disasters as may be determined by the Central Government;
- Take such other measures for the prevention of disaster, or the mitigation, or preparedness and capacity building for dealing with threatening disaster situations or disasters as it may consider necessary;
- Lay down broad policies and guidelines for the functioning of the National Institute of Disaster Management.

NDMA also equips and trains other Government officials, institutions and the community in mitigation for and response during a crisis situation or a disaster. It works closely with the National Institute of Disaster Management for capacity building. It develops practices, delivers hands-on training and organises drills for disaster management. It also equips and trains disaster management cells at the state and local levels.

NDMA, under the Ministry of Home Affairs can also be assigned with the responsibility for protection of cyber critical infrastructure. As a result NDMA has overlapping responsibilities with CERT-IN of MeitY and NCIIPC of the NTRO when it comes to securing critical/non-critical infrastructure.

== Programs ==
NDMA runs various programs for mitigation and responsiveness for specific situations. These include the National Cyclone Risk Management Project, School Safety Project, Decision Support System and others. India Disaster Response Summit held on 9 November 2017 held at New Delhi. This summit was jointly organised by the National Disaster Management Authority (NDMA) and social networking site Facebook. India has become the first country to partner with Facebook on disaster response.

== NDMA guidelines ==
Following are the guidelines as per NDMA's official website:

- Guidelines for Preparation of Action Plan - Prevention and Management of Heat Wave
- Landslide Risk Management Strategy
- Guidelines on Disability Inclusive Disaster Risk Reduction
- Guidelines on Temporary Shelters for Disaster-Affected Families
- Guidelines on Prevention & Management of Thunderstorm & Lightning/Squall/Dust/Hailstorm & Strong Winds
- Guidelines on Boat Safety
- Guidelines on Cultural Heritage Sites and Precincts
- Guidelines on Museums
- Guidelines on Minimum Standards of Relief
- Guidelines on Hospital Safety
- Guidelines on School Safety Policy
- Guidelines on Seismic Retrofitting of Deficient Buildings and Structures
- Guidelines on Scaling, Type of Equipment and Training of Fire Services
- Guidelines on National Disaster Management Information and Communication System
- Guidelines on Management of Drought
- Guidelines on Management of Urban Flooding
- Guidelines on Management of Dead in the Aftermath of Disaster
- Guidelines on Management of Tsunamis
- Guidelines on Incident Response System
- Guidelines on Psycho-Social Support and Mental Health Services in Disasters
- Guidelines on Management of Chemical(Terrorism) Disasters
- Guidelines on Management of Landslides and Snow Avalanches
- Guidelines on Management of Nuclear and Radiological Emergencies
- Guidelines on Management of Biological Disasters
- Guidelines on Management of Cyclones
- Guidelines on Management of Floods
- Guidelines on Medical Preparedness and Mass Casualty Management
- Guidelines on Preparation of State Disaster Management Plans
- Guidelines on Chemical Disasters
- Guidelines on Management of Earthquakes

== See also ==
- National Disaster Response Force
- National Institute of Disaster Management
