= Physiographical Regions of Bihar =

Geography of Bihar
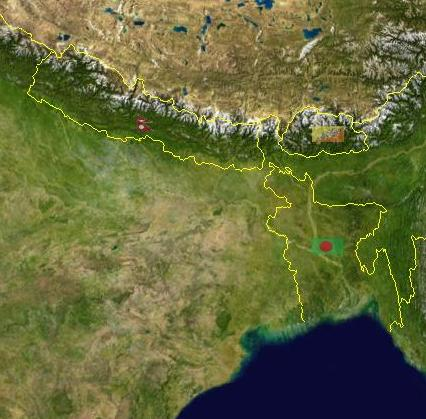
- Region: Indo-Gangetic Plain, East India
- Coordinates: 24°-20'-10" N ~ 27°-31'-15" N (latitude) and 83°-19'-50" E ~ 88°-17'-40" E longitude
- Area: Ranked 13
  - Total: 94,163 km^{2} (36,357 sq mi)
- Borders: North Side – Nepal; East Side – West Bengal; West Side – Uttar Pradesh; South Side – Jharkhand
- Longest river: Ganges
- Natural resources: Steatite, Pyrites, Quartzite, Crude Mica, Limestone
- Natural hazards: Floods

Located in the eastern India, Bihar is the twelfth-largest Indian state with an area of 94,163 km^{2} (36,357 mi^{2} ) and an average elevation of about 150 meters above mean sea level. The landlocked Bihar shares boundary with Nepal to the north, the states of West Bengal to the east, Jharkhand to the south and Uttar Pradesh to the west. Bihar has three parts on basis of physical and structural conditions- Southern Plateau Region, Bihar Plain, and Shivalik Region. Third, Shivalik Region in sub-Himalayan foothills of Shivalik range's shadows the state from Northern part of West Champaran over an area 32 km long and 6–8 km wide. West Champaran district are clad in a belt of moist deciduous forest. As well as trees, this consists of scrub, grass and reeds.

== Physiographical Regions ==
Physiographical, Bihar state can be divided into three Physiographical regions.

=== The Shivalik Range Region ===
Shivalik Hills are off-shoots of the Himalayan system and this sub-Himalayan foothills region lies in the northern part of the Bihar. There are some small hills like Someshwar hills and the Dun hills, in the extreme north of West Champaran. South of it lies the Tarai region, a belt of marshy and sparsely populated region.

=== The Bihar Plain ===
Bihar's Plain is located between the Southern Plateau and Northern Mountains which is bounded by 150m contour line in the North as well as in the South. The Ganga is the most dominant river of Bihar state and is joined by the rivers: Ghaghra, Gandak, Burhi Gandak, Bagmati, Kamla-Balan, Kosi and Mahananda flowing southward from Himalayas in northern part of the Gangetic Plain. The vast stretch of fertile Bihar Plain is divided by the Ganges River into two unequal part - the North Bihar and the South Bihar.

==== Northern Bihar Plain ====
It is located in Supaul, East Champaran & West Champaran (Terai area with higher elevation), and plains of Samastipur, Begusarai, Saharsa and Kathihar. Region is drained by Saryu, Gandak, Burhi Gandak, Bagmati, Kamla-Balan, Kosi and Mahanadi and their tributaries.

==== Southern Bihar Plain ====
It is narrow than northern plain of Bihar and triangular in shape because many hills are located in this region such as hills of Gaya, Rajgir, Giriak, Bihar Sharif, Sheikhpura, Jamalpur and Kharagpur hills.

=== The Southern Plateau Region ===
The region is in the southern flanks of Bihar between Southern Plain and Chhotanagpur Plateau of Jharkhand. It lies between Kaimur in the West to Banka in the East and It is made up of hard rock's like gneiss, schist and granite. This region blessed with many conical hills which are made up of batholith like Pretshil, Ramshila and Jethian hill.

== See also ==
- Geography of Bihar
- Administrative Division in Bihar
- Climate of Bihar
- Floods in Bihar
