= List of lakes of Bihar =

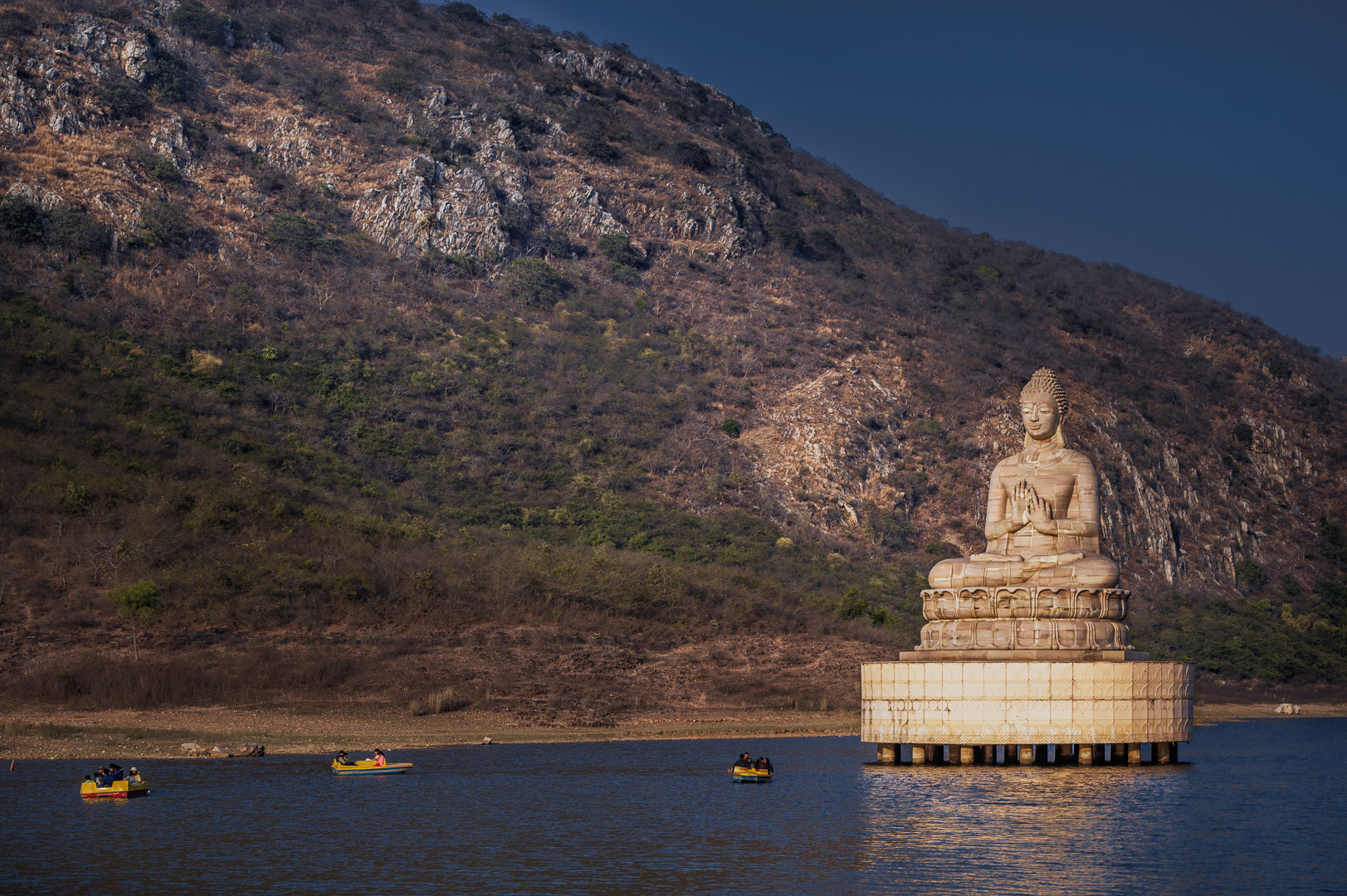
Ghora Katora Lake, Rajgir

This an incomplete list of Natural lakes, reservoir and notable man-made lakes of Bihar.

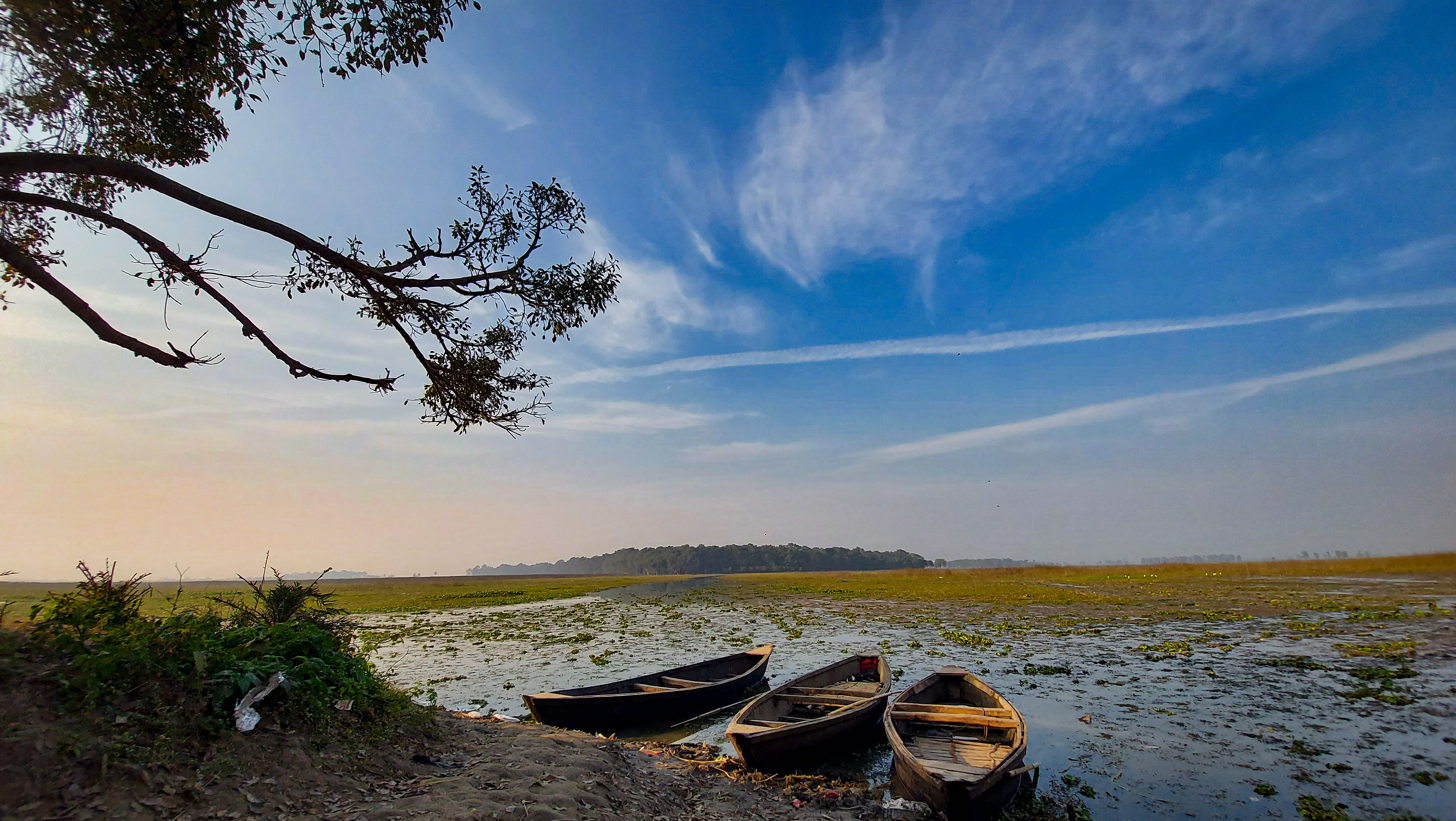
Kanwar Lake, Begusarai

== Alphabetical list of Natural Lakes ==
=== B ===
- Baraila Jheel - Vaishali district
- Basman Lake - East Champaran district

=== G ===
- Ghora Katora - Rajgir
- Gogabeel Lake

=== K ===
- Kanwar Lake - Begusarai

=== M ===
- MotiJheel

=== S ===
- Suhagman Lake - Champaran

=== U ===
- Udaypur Lake - West Champaran district

== Alphabetical List of artificial Ponds and reservoirs ==
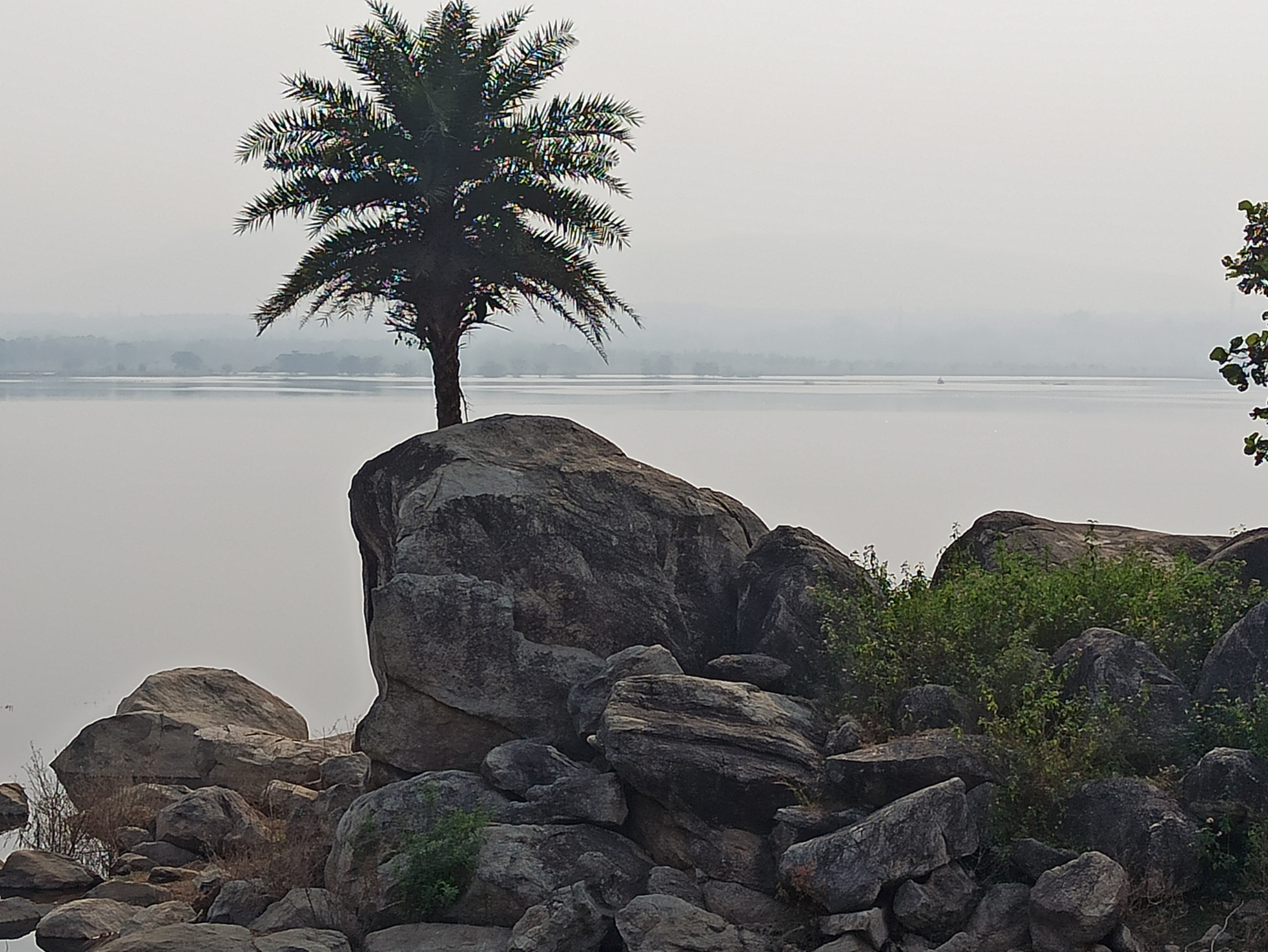
Nagi Reservoir, Katihar

- Collectorate Pond - Arrah
- Deane's Tanks - Arrah
- Devkhal Jheel - Samastipur
- Gautam Kund - Darbhanga
- Gokul Reservoir - Buxar
- Harahi Lake - Darbhanga
- Mangal Taalab - Patna City
- Matsyagandha Lake - Saharsa
- Nagi Reservoir - Katihar
- Rani Pokhra - Shergarh Fort
