= Geography of Bihar =

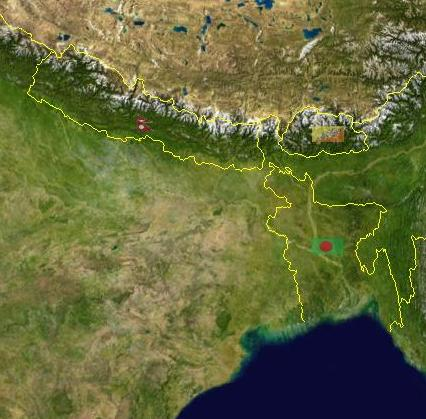
- Satellite Image of Bihar

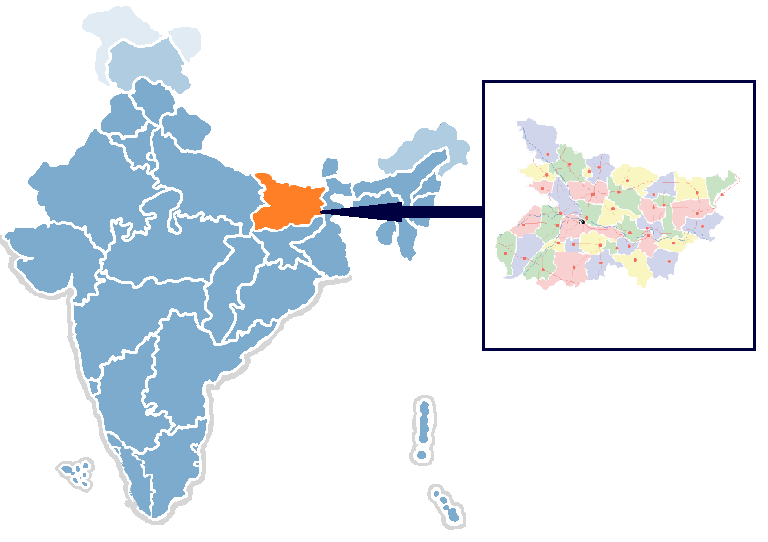
- Continent: Asia
- Region: Indo-Gangetic Plain, East India
- Coordinates: 25.4°N 85.1°E; Latitude : 24°-20'-10" N ~ 27°-31'-15" N Longitude : 83°-19'-50" E ~ 88°-17'-40" E
- Area: Ranked 13
  - Total: 94,163 km^{2} (36,357 sq mi)
- Coastline: 0 km (0 mi)
- Borders: North Side – Nepal; South-East Side – West Bengal; West Side – Uttar Pradesh; South Side – Jharkhand
- Highest point: Someshwar Fort; 880 m (2,887 ft)
- Longest river: Ganges
- Climate: A subtropical temperate zone with humid subtropical. Four seasons - Winter; Summer (Pre-monsoon); Rains (Monsoon); Autumn (Post-monsoon)
- Terrain: Large central Bihar Plain - divided by the Ganges into two unequal part. Highlands and mountains of Shivalik Range in north-west with forest, low mountains and valleys in the mid-south, subtropical tropical laurel jungle in South-West Kaimur Range of Southern Plateau Region, intermittent hilly and mountainous regions in central South with few valleys.
- Natural resources: Steatite, Pyrites, Quartzite, Crude Mica, Limestone
- Natural hazards: Floods

Bihar is located in the eastern region of India, between latitudes 25°20'10"N and 27°31'15"N and longitudes 83°19'50"E and 88°17'40"E. It is an entirely land–locked state, in a subtropical region of the temperate zone. Bihar lies between the humid West Bengal in the east and the sub humid Uttar Pradesh in the west, which provides it with a transitional position in respect of climate, economy and culture. It is bounded by Nepal in the north and by Jharkhand in the south. Bihar plain is divided into two unequal halves (North Bihar and South Bihar) by the river Ganges which flows through the middle from west to east. Bihar's land has average elevation above sea level of 173 feet.

== Physical and Structural Geography ==
Bihar has three parts on the basis of physical and structural conditions: The Southern Plateau Region, Bihar's Gangetic Plain, and the Shivalik Region. The Southern Plateau Region is located between Kaimur district in the West to Banka in the East. It is made up of hard rocks like gneiss, schist and granite. This region has many conical hills which are made up of batholim like Pretshil, Ramshila and Jethian hill. Bihar's Plain is located between the Southern Plateau and the Northern Mountains. It is bounded by the 150m contour line in the north as well as in the south. The vast stretch of fertile Bihar Plain is divided by the Ganges River into two unequal parts - North Bihar and the South Bihar. Northern Bihar's Plain is located in East Champaran & West Champaran (Terai area with higher elevation), and plains of Samastipur, Begusarai, Saharsa and Katihar . Region is drained by Saryu, Gandak, Burhi Gandak, Bagmati, Kamla-Balan, Kosi and Mahananda and their tributaries. Southern Bihar's Plain is narrow than northern plain of Bihar and triangular in shape because many hills are located in this region such as hills of Gaya, Rajgir, Giriyak, Bihar Sharif, Sheikhpura, Jamalpur and Kharagpur hills. Third, Shivalik Region in sub-Himalayan foothills of Shivalik range's shadows the state from Northern part of West Champaran over an area 32 km long and 6–8 km wide. West Champaran district are clad in a belt of moist deciduous forest. As well as trees, this consists of scrub, grass and reeds.

== Political geography ==
The state is divided into 9 divisions, 38 districts, 101 subdivisions and 534 circles. 12 municipal corporations, 49 Nagar Parishads and 80 Nagar Panchayats for administrative purposes.

Division	Headquarters	Districts	District map of Bihar
Patna	Patna	Bhojpur, Buxar, Kaimur, Patna, Rohtas, Nalanda	
Magadh	Gaya	Arwal, Aurangabad, Gaya, Jehanabad, Nawada	
Saran	Chapra	Saran, Siwan , Gopalganj	
Tirhut	Muzaffarpur	East Champaran, Muzaffarpur, Sheohar, Sitamarhi, Vaishali, West Champaran	
Purnia	Purnia	Araria, Katihar, Kishanganj, Purnia	
Bhagalpur	Bhagalpur	Banka, Bhagalpur	
Darbhanga	Darbhanga	Darbhanga, Madhubani, Samastipura	
Kosi	Saharsa	Madhepura, Saharsa, Supaul	
Munger	Munger	Begusarai,Jamui, Khagaria, Munger, Lakhisarai, Sheikhpura	

== Geology ==
Bihar's fertile alluvial soil are an important resource for agriculture. The state has three major soil type, the gangetic alluvium, Terai Soil and Piedmont Swamp soil. Thus Indo-Gangetic plain's soil is the backbone of agricultural and industrial development. The Indo-Gangetic plain in Bihar consists of a thick alluvial mantle of drift origin overlying in most part, the siwalik and older tertiary rocks. The soil is mainly little young loam rejuvenated every year by constant deposition of silt, clay and sand brought by streams but mainly by floods in Bihar

This soil is deficient in phosphoric acid, nitrogen and humus, but potash and lime are usually present in sufficient quantity. The most common soil in Bihar is Gangetic alluvium of Indo-Gangetic plain region, Piedmont Swamp Soil which is found in northwestern part of West Champaran district and Terai Soil which is found in eastern part of Bihar along the border of Nepal. clay soil, sand soil and loamy soil are common in Bihar.

== Natural resources ==
Bihar is mainly a vast stretch of very fertile flat land. It is drained by the Ganges River, including northern tributaries of other river. The Bihar plain is divided into two unequal halves by the river Ganges which flows through the middle from west to east. Other Ganges tributaries are the Son, Budhi Gandak, Chandan, Orhani and Phalgu. The Himalayas begin at foothills a short distance inside Nepal but influence Bihar's landforms, climate, hydrology and culture. Central parts of Bihar have some small hills, for example the Rajgir Hills. The Himalayan Mountains are to the north of Bihar, in Nepal. To the south is the Chota Nagpur plateau, which was part of Bihar until 2000 but now is part of a separate state called Jharkhand.

=== Forest ===
Bihar has notified forest area of 6,764.14 km^{2}, which is 7.1 per cent of its geographical area. The sub Himalayan foothill of Someshwar and Dun ranges in Champaran district another belt of moist deciduous forests. These also consists of shrub, grass and reeds. Here the rainfall is above 1,600 mm and thus promotes luxuriant Sal forests in the favoured areas. The hot and dry summer gives the deciduous forests. The most important trees are Shorea Robusta (Sal), Shisham, Cedrela Toona, Khair, and Semal. This type of forests also occurs in Saharsa district and Purnia district.

=== Minerals ===
Bihar is a producer of Steatite (945 tonnes), Pyrites (9,539 tonnes/year), Quartzite (14,865 tonnes/year), Crude Mica (53 tonnes/year), Limestone (4,78,000 tonnes/year). Bihar has also some good resource of Bauxite in Jamui district, Cement Mortar in Bhabhua, dolomite in Bhabhua, Glass sand in Bhabhua, Mica in Muzaffarpur, Nawada, Jamui, Gaya and salt in Gaya and Jamui, Uranium and Beryllium are found in Gaya District, Coal in Rajmahal Coalfield, Gold In Jamui.

== Water bodies ==
=== River ===
- Ajay River
- Bagmati
- Budhi Gandak
- Bhutahi Balan
- Gandak
- Ganges
- Ghaghara
- Phalgu
- Gandaki River
- Kamala
- Karmanasha
- Koshi River
- Mahananda River
- Mohana
- Punpun
- Sapt Koshi
- Son River

=== Waterfall ===
- Dhua Kund Falls
- Kakolat Waterfall
- Karkat Waterfall
- Madhuvdhandam Falls
- Manjhar Kund Waterfall
- North Tank Waterfall
- Telhar Waterfall

=== Spring (hydrosphere) ===
- Manjhar Kund
- Dhua Kund
- Sita Kund
- Surya Kund
- Rishi Kund

=== Lake ===
- Anupam Lake
- Kharagpur Lake
- Kanwar Lake Begusarai
- Ghora Katora Darbhanga
- Gogabil Lake Katihar
- Matsyagandha Lake

=== Pond ===
- Mangal Talab
- Pandu Pokhar

==== Dams and reservoirs ====
- Indrapuri Barrage

== Hills and caves ==
=== Hills ===
- Barabar hills
- Brahmayoni hills Gaya Dist
- Brahmajuni Hills
- Bateshwar hills
- Dungeshwari hills
- Gridhakuta hills
- Gurpa hills
- Kavadol Hills/Kauvadol
- Kaimur Range
- Mandar Hills
- Mundeshwari Hills
- Nagarjuni Hills
- Pretshila Hills
- Pragbodhi hills
- Ramshila Hills
- Rajgir hills
- Ramshila hills
- Vaibhar Hills

=== Caves ===
- Barabar Caves
- Bateshwar cave
- Dungeshwari Cave
- Gopika Cave
- Indasala Caves
- Lomas Rishi Cave
- Mahakala caves
- Patalpuri Caves
- Pippala cave
- Saptaparni Cave
- Sattaparnaguha Cave
- Son Bhandar Caves
- Sitamarhi Cave
- Vadathika Cave

== Natural hazards ==
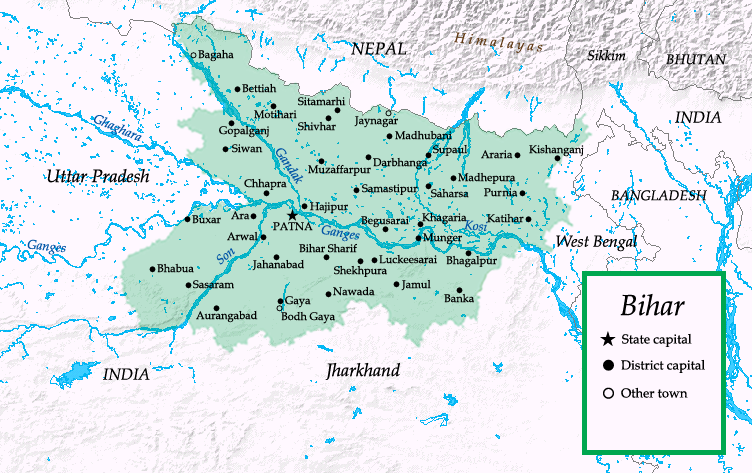
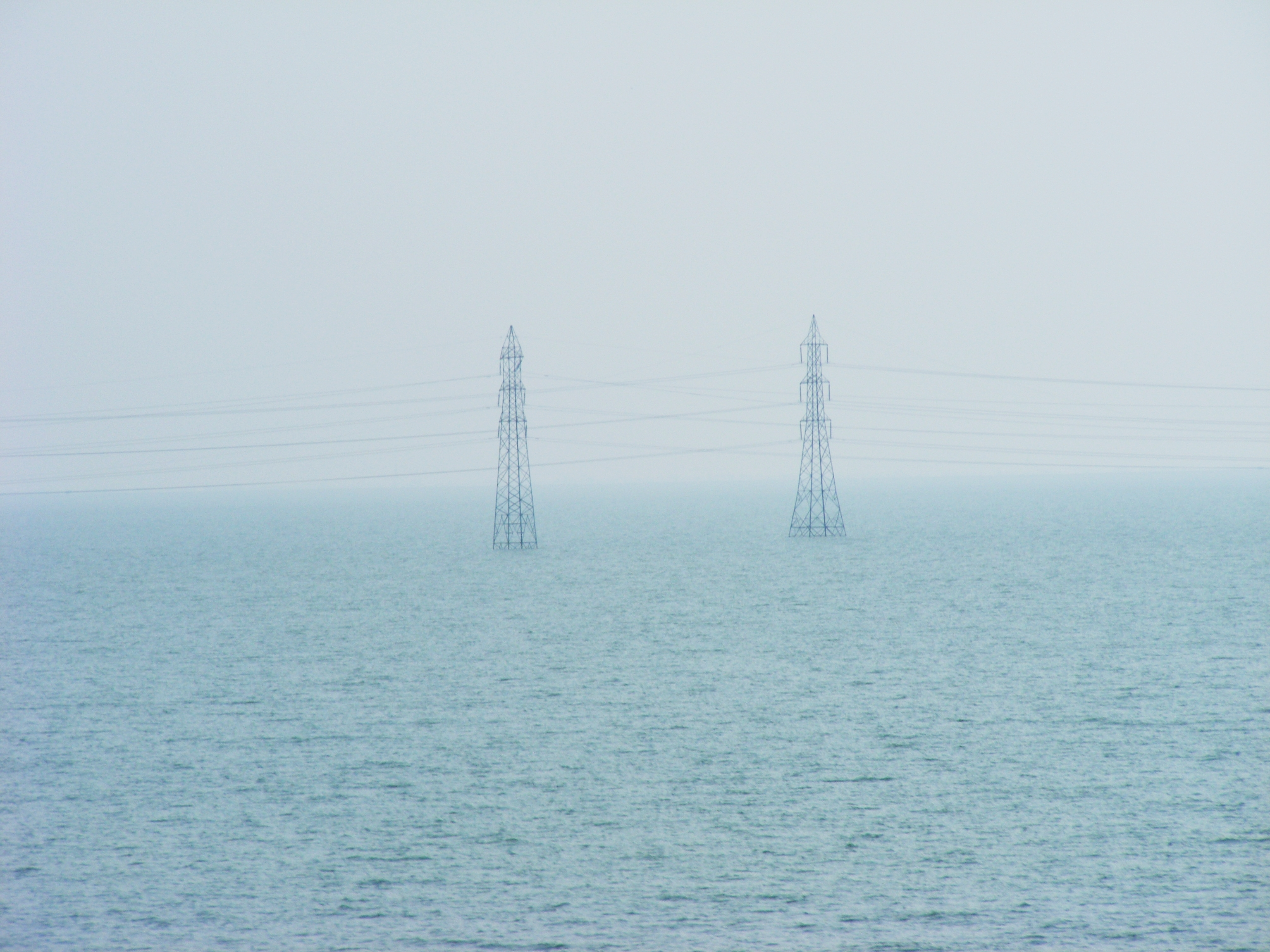
Above: River Map of Bihar Below: flooded farmlands in northern Bihar during the 2008 Bihar flood.

=== Flood ===
Total human deaths is 5874 and animal deaths is 19044 in Bihar due to floods between 1979–2006

Bihar is India's most flood-prone state, with 76% of the population in the north Bihar living under the recurring threat of flood devastation. According to some historical data, 16.5% of the total flood affected area in India is located in Bihar while 22.1% of the flood affected population in India lives in Bihar. About 68,800 square kilometres (26,600 mi^{2}) out of total geographical area of 94,160 square kilometres (36,360 mi^{2}) comprising 73.06% is flood affected. Floods in Bihar are a recurring disaster which on an annual basis destroys thousands of human lives apart from livestock and assets worth millions.

== Climate ==
Bihar has cool winters, the lowest temperatures being around 0–10 degrees Celsius (33 to 50 degrees Fahrenheit). Winter months are December and January. It is hot in the summer with average highs around 35–45 Celsius ( 95–105 Fahrenheit). April to mid June are the hot months. The monsoon months of June, July, August, and September see good rainfall. October & November and February & March have cool, pleasant climate.

== See also ==
- 1934 Nepal–Bihar earthquake
- Climate of Bihar
- Floods in Bihar
