= Yaksha Prashna =

Episode in the Hindu epic Mahabharata

The Yaksha Prashna (IAST: yakṣa praśna), also known as the Dharma Baka Upakhyana (the Legend of the Virtuous Crane) or the Akshardhama, is the story of a question-and-answer dialogue between Yudhishthira and a yaksha in the Hindu epic Mahabharata. It appears in the Vana Parva, and the story is set as the Pandavas end their twelve years of exile in the forest.

== Vana Parva ==
At the end of their 12 years of exile in the forests, the time had come for the Pandavas to live incognito in Agyatavasa (exile). As they were discussing their course of action, the princes met a Brahmana who complained that a deer has taken on its antlers his arani— a pair of wooden blocks used to start fire by friction— so he couldn't light the fire for Vedic rituals. So, the Pandavas set out to retrieve the Brahmin's arani and followed the hoofprints of the deer. While following the mysterious deer, Yudhishthira became exhausted and thirsty. So, his brother Nakula set out to fetch water and found a beautiful lake. The lake was devoid of any living creature, except for a crane. When he attempted to take water from the lake, the crane spoke, "O Nakula! The water of this lake will turn into poison if you take it without satisfactorily answering my questions." Nakula ignored the crane, hastily drank the poisonous water, and died. Nakula's twin, Sahadeva, came in search of his brother and found the same lake, saw Nakula dead, and was warned by the crane. But, Sahadeva too ignored the crane and died after drinking the water. One after the other, Arjuna and Bhima met the same fate.

When none of his brothers returned with water, Yudhishthira followed the trail to the lake and found them all lying dead. Before searching for his brothers' killer, he decided to drink some water from the lake. But when the crane warned him, he realised that the crane held the answer to the turn of events, and agreed to answer its questions. The crane then revealed itself as a Yaksha. The Yaksha asked Yudhishthira approximately 125 questions on gods, metaphysics, philosophy, and similar topics:

Yaksha’s Prashna (questions)	Yudhisthra Uttara (answers)
Sun God	
Who makes the sun rise?	Brahma (the Supreme)
Who keeps the sun company?	Gods
Who causes the sun to set?	Dharma
And in whom is the sun established?	Truth
Learning, intelligence	
By what does one become learned?	By Srutis (that scriptures which are heard)
How one acquires something very great?	By ascetics austerities (tapas)
How can one acquire intelligence?	By serving the old
Brahmins (learned/saints)	
What constituents the divinity of Brahmanas?	Study of Vedas (scriptures)
What is pious practice in them?	Their asceticism (penance) constituents' behavior that is like that of the pious.
What is human attributes of Brahmanas?	Death
What is impious practice in them?	Insulting anyone is their impiety.
Kshatriyas (kings/warriors)	
What constituents the divinity of Kshatriyas?	Arrows and their weapons
What is pious practice in them?	Celebration of sacrifices
What is human attributes of Kshatriyas?	Fear
What is impious practice in them?	Refusal of protection Dharma
Cultivate, sow, prosperity	
What is value to those who cultivate?	Rain
What is value to those who sow?	Seed
What is value to those who wish the prosperity in this world?	Preacher
What is value to those who that bring forth?	Offspring
Living dead	
What person who enjoying all the objects of sensing, breathing but yet is not alive?	The person who do not offer anything to gods, guests, servant, pitris etc.
Heavier, higher, fleeter, numerous	
What is heavier than earth?	Mother
What is higher than heaven?	Father
What is fleeter (running fast) than wind?	Mind
What is more numerous than grass?	Thoughts
Generic – miscellaneous	
What sleeps but does not close its eyes?	Fish
What does not move after birth?	Egg
What which is without a heart?	Stone
What swells in its own impetus?	River
Friend	
Who is friend of the exile?	Companion
Who is friend of the householder?	Wife
Who is friend of the sick?	Physician
Who is friend of one who is about to die?	Charity
Duty, guest, amrita, universe	
Who is guest of all creatures?	Agni (fire)
What is eternal duty?	Homa (Yajna sacrifice), following regulations of Sanatan Dharam
What is Amrita?	Milk of cow is Amrita
What is in the universe?	Universe consists of air alone.
Mortal/immortal/rebirth	
What is that which stays alone?	The sun
What is reborn after its birth?	The moon
What is remedy against cold?	Fire
What is the largest field?	Earth
Virtue/fame/heaver/happiness	
What is highest shelter of virtue?	Liberty is the highest guard of virtue
What is highest shelter of fame?	Gift is the highest guard of fame
What is highest shelter of heaven?	Truth is highest guard of heaven
What is highest shelter of happiness?	Good behavior is the highest guard of happiness
Man's (soul, friend, support)	
What is soul of man?	Son
Who is that friend bestowed on man by the gods?	Wife
What is man’s chief support?	Clouds
What is man’s chief refuge?	Charity
Possessions/gains/happiness	
What is best of all laudable things?	Skills
What is most valuable possession?	Knowledge
What is best of all gains?	Health
What is best of all kind of happiness?	Contentment
Duty, regret, alliance	
What is the highest duty in the world?	Refrain from injury is the highest duty
What is that virtue which always bears fruits?	Rites ordained in Vedas always bear fruits
What is that if controlled, leads to no regret?	Mind if controlled, leads no regrets
With whom alliance cannot break?	Alliance with good never breaks
What if renounced	
What if renounced, make one agreeable?	Pride
What if renounced, leads no regret?	Anger
What if renounced, makes one wealthy?	Desire
What if renounced, makes one happy?	Greed
Why giving	
Why one give to Brahmanas?	For religious merit
Why one give to actors/dancers?	For fame
Why one give to servants?	For supporting them
Why one give to king?	For obtaining relief from fear
Discovering	
With what is world enveloped?	Darkness
What is that owing to which a thing cannot discover itself?	Darkness not permit a thing to show itself
Why one fail to go to heaven?	Connection with world make one fail to go to heaven
Why friends are forsaken?	Greed and lust
Dead	
Which one is considered as dead?	One having want of wealth
Which sacrifice is considered as dead?	One having no gifts for Brahmanas
Which Shardha (Puja) is considered as dead?	Shardha performed by aid of Guru, who having no real knowledge
Which kingdom is considered as dead?	Kingdom of want of a king
Restrain, forgiveness, shame	
What is sign of asceticism?	Staying in one’s own religion
What is true restraint?	Restrain of mind
What is forgiveness?	Stable enmity
What is shame?	Withdrawing from all unworthy acts
Knowledge, peace, mercy, simplicity	
What is true knowledge?	True knowledge of the Lord (Krishna)
What is tranquility (peace)?	True tranquility of heart
What is mercy?	Wishing happiness for all living creatures
What is simplicity?	Calmness of heart
Enemy, disease, honest/dishonest	
Which enemy is invincible?	Anger
What is incurable disease?	Greediness
Who is honest?	Wishes well for all creatures
Who is dishonest?	Un-merciful
Ignorance, pride, idleness, grief	
What is ignorance?	Not knowing one’s duty
What is pride?	Consciousness of one’s being himself sufferer in life (ignorance)
What is idleness?	Not discharging one’s prescribed duties
What is grief?	Ignorance
Patience, real bath, charity	
What is steadiness?	Staying in one’s own religion
What is patience?	Overpowering of senses
What is real ablution (bath)?	Washing the mind, clean of all impurities
What is charity?	Protecting all creatures
Learned, atheist, desire, envy	
Who is learned?	Who knows his duties
Who is atheist?	Who is ignorant
What is desire?	Desire is due to object of possession
What is envy?	Grief of heart
Hypocrisy, wickedness	
What is hypocrisy?	Setting up of religious standards
What is wickedness?	Speaking bad of others
What is grace of gods?	Fruits of our gifts (charity)
What one gains, on…..	
What one gains on speaking agreeable words?	One becomes agreeable to all
What one gains on acting with judgment?	One obtains whatever one seeks
What one gains having many friends?	One lives happily
What one gain if devoted to virtue?	One obtains a happy state in next world
True happiness, most wonderful	
Who is truly happy?	One who can cook in own home One who refrain from tamas food One who has no debt One who does not come out of home for his livelihood One who does not over striving for material things
What is most wonderful?	Every day numerous living entities are dying and going to the abode of Yama. Yet one think/believe one will live remain forever (immortal). What can be more wonderful than this?
What is the path?	The best path is to follow in the footsteps of the pure devotees (mahajanas) whose hearts are full of real truth regarding Dharma.
What is the news? (What is the real situation in the material world)?	This world full of ignorance is like a pan. The sun is fire, the days and nights are fuel. The months and the seasons constitute the wooden ladle. Time is the cook that is cooking all creatures in that pan (with such aids); This is the real news of what is happening in the material world, which is a miserable place full of ignorance
Dharma, Artha, Kama	
Dharma (virtue), Artha (profit) and Kama (desire) are opposed to each other, how they can co-exist harmoniously?	They can co-exists only if, one having a virtuous Wife.
Condemned to everlasting hell	
Who is condemned on what acts, to everlasting hell?	If one promise a poor Brahmin, a charity; but upon his arrival refuse to give him. Who speak falsehood of Vedas, scriptures, Who despite possessing, does not give because of greediness.
About real Brahmin	
What constituents the real Brahmana? Birth, study, family, learning or behaviour?	Behaviour Note: A Shudra is better; if his behavior is better than a so-called learned Brahmana (having wicked behavior, not matter how much he has learned)
True man	
Who is true man, possessing all kinds of wealth?	One who has overcome the dualities of material life, i.e. happiness/sadness, friend/enemy, love/hate, heat/cold, etc. possesses all kinds of wealth.
Generic ~ miscellaneous	
What is poison?	Requesting someone
What is proper time for Puja (Shraddha)?	There is no proper time for Shraddha (puja), when one want one can, (if possible find a Guru). One can do puja to Lord Hari any time; one can take his name any time.
What is food?	Cow is the root of all foods, Cow gives milk, which produce butter ghee, which is used in Yajna, sacrifices. The sacrifices are causes of clouds, which bring rain. Rain is essential for producing food from seeds, (corps).

Yudhishthira had answered all questions in a satisfactory manner, but the Yaksha only allowed him to choose one of his brothers to be restored to life. Yudhishthira chose his younger half-brother, Nakula, the son of his stepmother Madri, reasoning that his own mother, Kunti, had a living son regardless, but his stepmother Madri did not.

The Yaksha was impressed by how Yudhishthira followed dharma in every little thing he did. Yaksha revealed himself to be Yama-Dharma, the god of death, who was also Yudhishthira's father. He revealed to that it was he who had disguised himself as a deer and stolen the arani. He blessed Yudishthira, telling him that since he had adhered to dharma (righteousness), that dharma would protect the Pandavas and no one would recognise them during their exile. All of the Pandavas were restored to life.

== See also ==
- Devkhal Jheel
- Yudhishthira
- Yaksha kingdom
