= Kauvadol =

Coordinates: 24.99433467011334°N 85.02441774768153°E

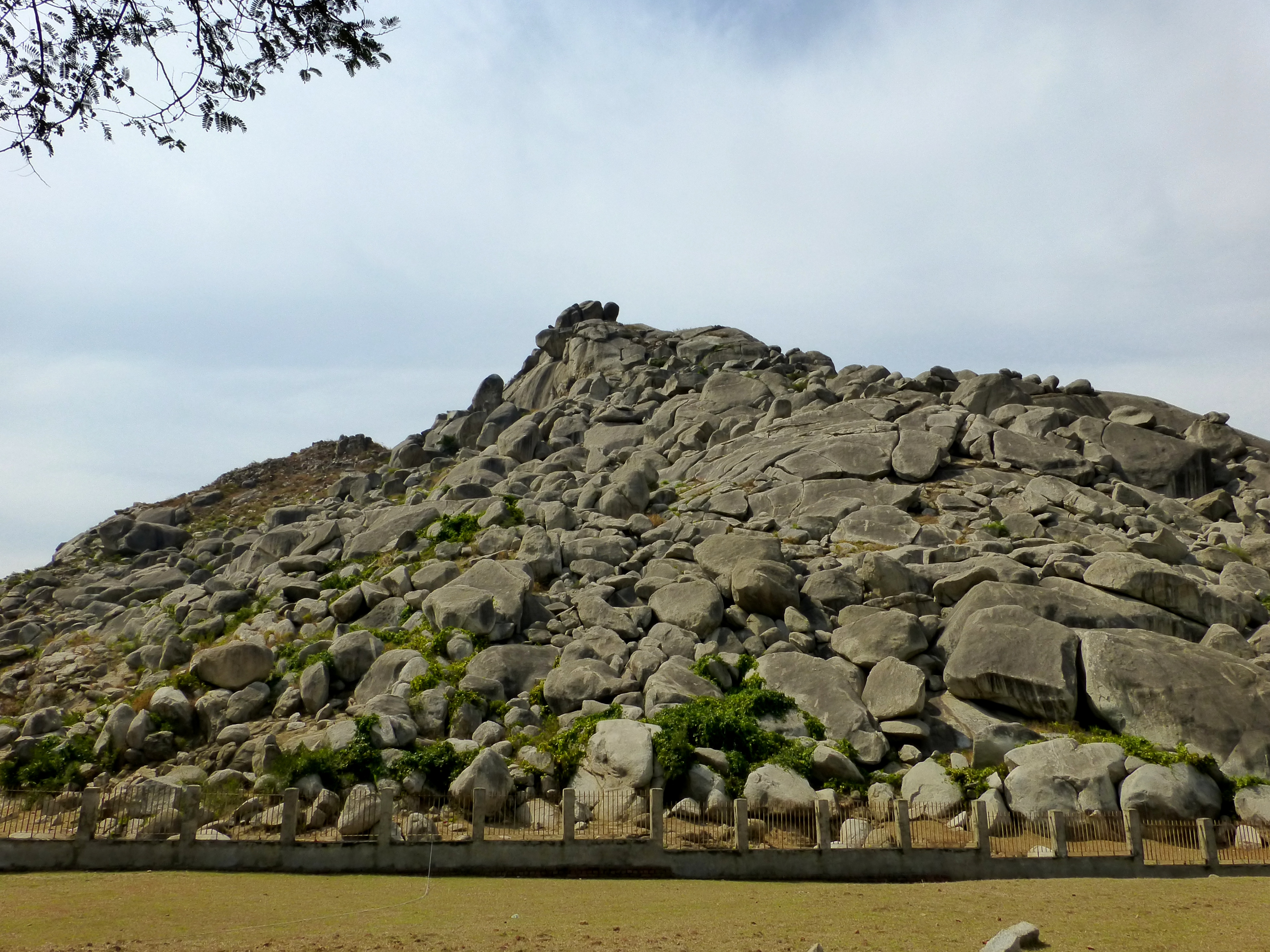
Kauvadol Hill

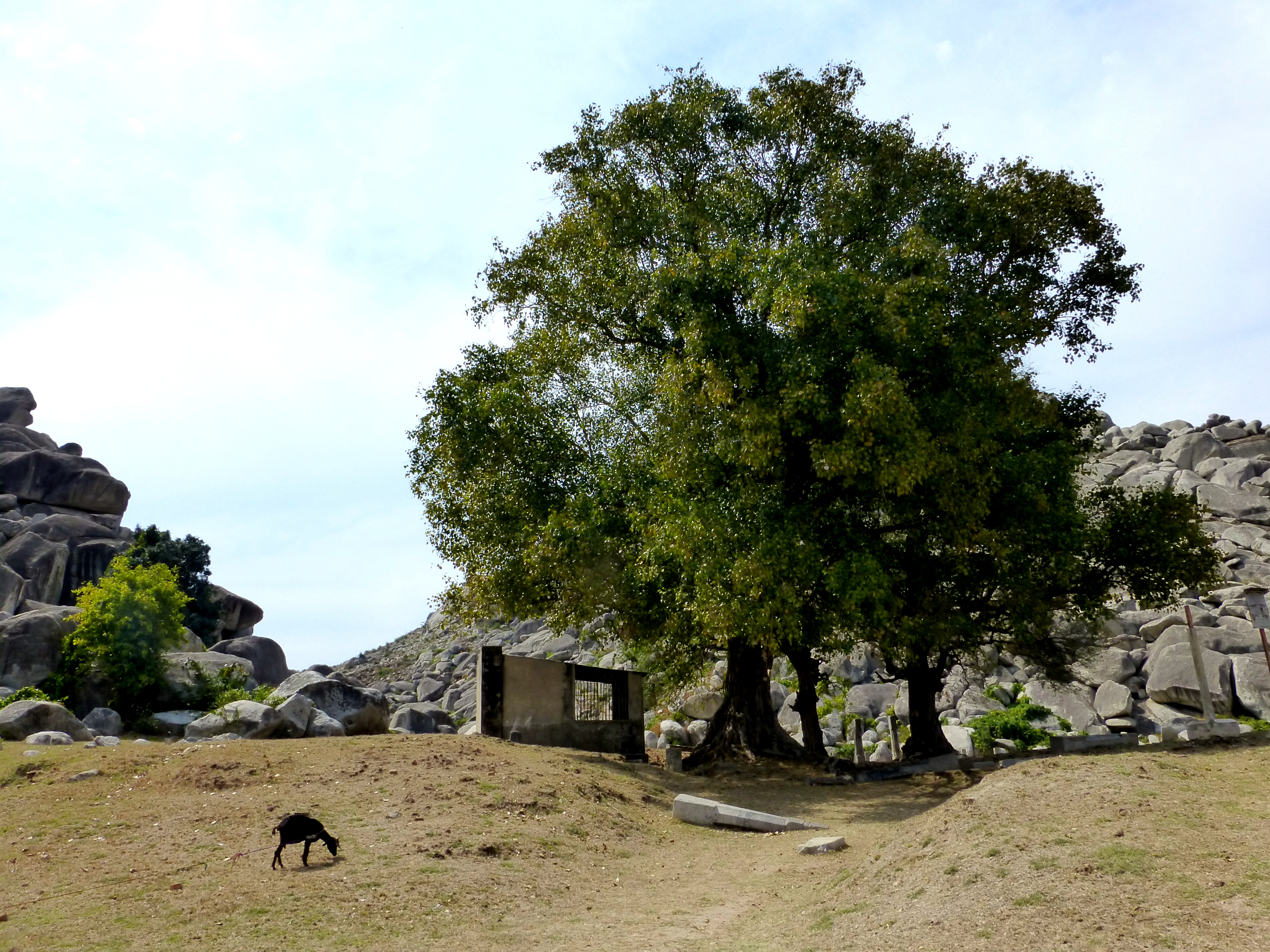
Kauvadol - Shrine near Tree

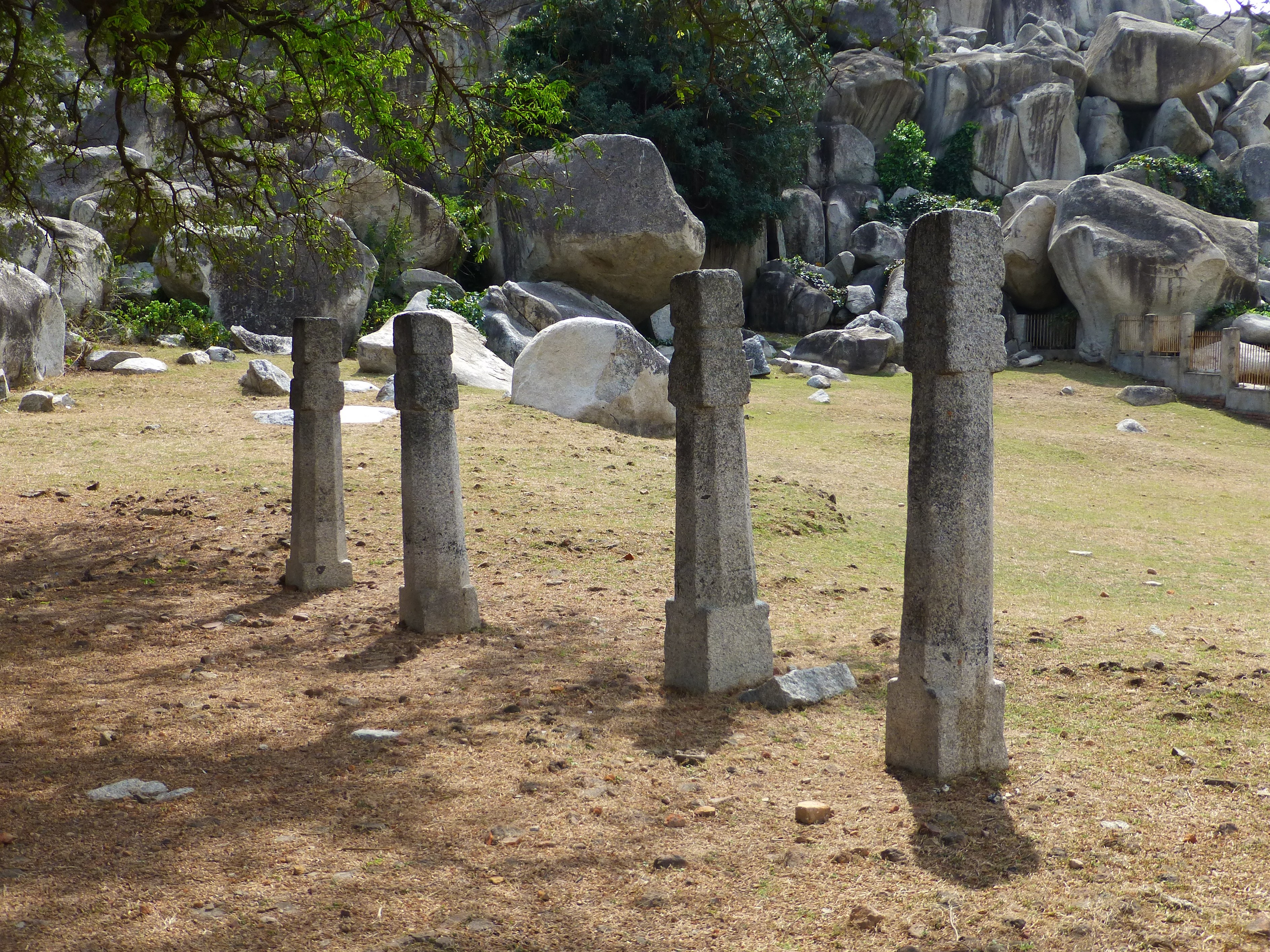
Kauvadol -Columns

Kauvadol is the name of a hill about 4 Kilometers south-west from the Barabar Hills and about 12 Kilometers east from Bela Railway Station. The name literally means "crows swing," which, it is said, is derived from the folk myth that a huge block of stone was once lying so well balanced on the existing pinnacle of the hill that it used to rock when a crow alighted on it. Below the hill are the ruins of an ancient Vihara that surround the area. The site was first noticed by Buchanan during his tour of observations for the East India Company in the year 1811–12. Later, Major Kittoe, Cunningham and Beglar also visited the site and noted the ruins of the Vihara.

The rock is referred to as Kawa Dol in A Passage to India.
