= Climate of Bihar =

Overview of the climate of the Indian state

Climate chart (precipitation, max. and min. temperature)
J	F	M	A	M	J	J	A	S	O	N	D
12 24 9	9.9 26 11	12 32 16	24 37 21	56 37 24	165 36 26	325 33 25	276 33 25	217 32 25	83 32 21	6.4 29 15	6 25 10
- █ Average max. and min. temperatures in °C
- █ Precipitation totals in mm
Imperial conversion
J	F	M	A	M	J	J	A	S	O	N	D
0.5 74 49	0.4 79 53	0.5 90 61	0.9 98 70	2.2 99 75	6.5 96 78	13 91 78	11 91 78	8.5 90 77	3.3 89 71	0.3 84 59	0.2 77 51
- █ Average max. and min. temperatures in °F
- █ Precipitation totals in inches

Located in eastern India, Bihar is the twelfth-largest Indian state, with an area of 94,163 km^{2} (36,357 mi^{2}) and an average elevation of about 150 metres above mean sea level. The landlocked state shares a boundary with Nepal to the north, the state of West Bengal to the east, Jharkhand to the south, and Uttar Pradesh to the west. Bihar lies in a subtropical temperate zone and its climatic type is humid subtropical.

== Classification ==
According to the Köppen climate classification, Bihar's climate mainly falls under subtropical monsoon, mild and dry winter, and hot summer (Cwa), except for southeastern parts of the state, such as Jamui, Banka, Munger, Lakhisarai, Khagaria, Shekhpura, some parts of Bhagalpur, Saharsa, and Begusarai. The southeastern part of the state is located in an extreme that falls under tropical savanna, hot, and seasonally dry (usually winter) (Aw).

== Seasons ==
=== Winter ===
Cold weather commences early in November and comes to an end in the middle of March. The climate in October and November is pleasant. The days are bright and warm. As soon as the sun sets, the temperature falls and the heat of the day yields to a sharp bracing cold. Cold waves, locally known as Sheet-lahar, bring in the sharpness in winter and drastically drop the temperature in Bihar, disrupting lives of millions of poor people and also causing several deaths. The temperature in winter all over Bihar varies from 0–10 °C. On 7 January 2013, in early morning, the mercury dipped to a record low of -2 °C in Forbesganj, 0 °C in Gopalganj, 0.2 °C in Jehanabad, 0.7 °C in Vaishali, -1 °C in Patna and Muzaffarpur, as well as other cities. December and January are the coldest months in Bihar.

=== Summer ===
Hot weather arrives in March and lasts until the middle of June. The highest temperature is often registered in May. Like the rest of northern India, Bihar also experiences dust storms, thunderstorms, and dust-raising winds during the hot season. Dust storms with a velocity of 48–64 km/hour are most frequent in May, followed by April and June. The hot winds (loo) of the Bihar plains blow during April and May, with an average velocity of 8–16 km/hour. The hot wind greatly affects human comfort during this season.

=== Rain (monsoon) ===
variation in rainfall across India

Monsoon season in Bihar is usually unpredictable and erratic. It begins in mid-June and continues until the end of September.

=== Autumn (post-monsoon) ===
An important feature of the retreating monsoon season in Bihar is the invasion of tropical cyclones originating in the Bay of Bengal at about 12° N latitude. Bihar is also influenced by typhoons originating in the South China Sea. The maximum frequency of the tropical cyclones occurs in September–November, especially during the asterism called hathiya. These cyclones are essential for the maturing of rice paddies and are required for the moistening of the soil for the cultivation of rabi crops.

== Statistics ==
=== Temperature ===
Average temperatures in various cities of Bihar (°C)
—	Winter (Jan – Feb)		Summer (Mar – May)			Monsoon (Jun – Sep)				Post-monsoon (Oct – Dec)			Year-round
City	Jan	Feb	Mar	Apr	May	Jun	Jul	Aug	Sep	Oct	Nov	Dec	Avg
Patna	16	19	25	30	31	31	29	29	28	26	22	17	26
Arrah	16	18	24	30	31	30	29	28	29	26	21	17	25
Darbhanga	16	18	23	28	29	29	29	28	28	26	21	17	25

=== Precipitation ===
Average precipitation in various cities of Bihar (mm)
—	Winter (Jan – Feb)		Summer (Mar – May)			Monsoon (Jun – Sep)				Post-monsoon (Oct – Dec)			Year-round
City	Jan	Feb	Mar	Apr	May	Jun	Jul	Aug	Sep	Oct	Nov	Dec	Total
Patna	10	---	10	---	40	120	220	260	170	70	10	---	990
Gaya	20	19	12	7	21	137	314	328	206	53	10	4	1130
Arrah	10	10	10	---	30	180	290	330	210	50	---	---	1180
Darbhanga	10	10	10	10	60	190	300	340	230	50	---	---	1260

=== Climate data ===
Climate data for Patna (Köppen Cwa)
Month	Jan	Feb	Mar	Apr	May	Jun	Jul	Aug	Sep	Oct	Nov	Dec	Year
Record high °C (°F)	30.0 (86.0)	35.1 (95.2)	41.4 (106.5)	44.6 (112.3)	45.6 (114.1)	46.6 (115.9)	41.2 (106.2)	39.7 (103.5)	37.5 (99.5)	37.2 (99.0)	34.1 (93.4)	30.5 (86.9)	46.6 (115.9)
Mean daily maximum °C (°F)	22.4 (72.3)	26.0 (78.8)	32.2 (90.0)	37.0 (98.6)	37.4 (99.3)	36.4 (97.5)	33.0 (91.4)	32.9 (91.2)	32.5 (90.5)	31.9 (89.4)	29.0 (84.2)	24.5 (76.1)	31.3 (88.3)
Mean daily minimum °C (°F)	9.3 (48.7)	12.1 (53.8)	16.7 (62.1)	22.1 (71.8)	25.1 (77.2)	26.7 (80.1)	26.3 (79.3)	26.3 (79.3)	25.5 (77.9)	21.5 (70.7)	15.1 (59.2)	10.5 (50.9)	19.8 (67.6)
Record low °C (°F)	1.1 (34.0)	3.4 (38.1)	8.2 (46.8)	13.3 (55.9)	17.7 (63.9)	19.3 (66.7)	21.1 (70.0)	20.5 (68.9)	19.0 (66.2)	12.0 (53.6)	7.7 (45.9)	2.2 (36.0)	1.1 (34.0)
Average rainfall mm (inches)	11.1 (0.44)	14.0 (0.55)	9.5 (0.37)	12.7 (0.50)	43.7 (1.72)	162.5 (6.40)	354.4 (13.95)	277.8 (10.94)	197.7 (7.78)	49.1 (1.93)	7.2 (0.28)	6.1 (0.24)	1,145.8 (45.11)
Average rainy days	1.2	1.3	0.7	1.0	2.9	6.9	14.3	12.5	9.5	2.9	0.5	0.6	54.2
Average relative humidity (%) (at 17:30 IST)	65	52	37	32	42	59	75	75	76	68	67	69	60
Mean monthly sunshine hours	207.7	228.8	260.4	264.0	272.8	192.0	130.2	151.9	162.0	238.7	240.0	201.5	2,550
Mean daily sunshine hours	6.7	8.1	8.4	8.8	8.8	6.4	4.2	4.9	5.4	7.7	8.0	6.5	7.0
Average ultraviolet index	6	7	9	11	12	12	12	12	11	8	6	5	9
Source 1: India Meteorological Department (sun 1971–2000)
Source 2: Weather Atlas

Climate data for Gaya (Köppen Cwa)
Month	Jan	Feb	Mar	Apr	May	Jun	Jul	Aug	Sep	Oct	Nov	Dec	Year
Record high °C (°F)	31.7 (89.1)	36.1 (97.0)	42.1 (107.8)	45.0 (113.0)	47.1 (116.8)	47.9 (118.2)	43.7 (110.7)	42.3 (108.1)	42.3 (108.1)	37.2 (99.0)	35.0 (95.0)	31.1 (88.0)	47.9 (118.2)
Mean daily maximum °C (°F)	23.0 (73.4)	26.7 (80.1)	32.8 (91.0)	38.7 (101.7)	39.8 (103.6)	37.8 (100.0)	33.4 (92.1)	32.9 (91.2)	32.6 (90.7)	31.6 (88.9)	28.8 (83.8)	24.9 (76.8)	31.9 (89.4)
Mean daily minimum °C (°F)	8.7 (47.7)	11.6 (52.9)	16.1 (61.0)	21.8 (71.2)	25.4 (77.7)	26.7 (80.1)	25.6 (78.1)	25.4 (77.7)	24.6 (76.3)	20.5 (68.9)	14.2 (57.6)	9.7 (49.5)	19.2 (66.6)
Record low °C (°F)	1.5 (34.7)	2.7 (36.9)	7.8 (46.0)	12.9 (55.2)	14.1 (57.4)	18.3 (64.9)	16.7 (62.1)	18.5 (65.3)	17.5 (63.5)	12.2 (54.0)	6.1 (43.0)	1.4 (34.5)	1.4 (34.5)
Average rainfall mm (inches)	13.9 (0.55)	16.0 (0.63)	10.7 (0.42)	11.3 (0.44)	32.5 (1.28)	157.6 (6.20)	306.0 (12.05)	266.0 (10.47)	177.3 (6.98)	56.0 (2.20)	9.5 (0.37)	4.9 (0.19)	1,061.6 (41.80)
Average rainy days	1.2	1.4	1.0	1.0	2.5	7.1	14.2	13.6	8.8	2.5	0.6	0.5	54.4
Average relative humidity (%) (at 17:30 IST)	55	47	31	25	35	54	76	77	76	66	56	58	54
Source: India Meteorological Department

Climate data for Bhagalpur (Köppen Cwa)
Month	Jan	Feb	Mar	Apr	May	Jun	Jul	Aug	Sep	Oct	Nov	Dec	Year
Record high °C (°F)	31.9 (89.4)	35.8 (96.4)	42.6 (108.7)	45.3 (113.5)	46.4 (115.5)	46.0 (114.8)	42.3 (108.1)	39.7 (103.5)	38.6 (101.5)	40.0 (104.0)	37.4 (99.3)	32.2 (90.0)	46.4 (115.5)
Mean daily maximum °C (°F)	23.0 (73.4)	27.1 (80.8)	33.4 (92.1)	37.6 (99.7)	37.5 (99.5)	36.4 (97.5)	33.3 (91.9)	33.4 (92.1)	33.2 (91.8)	32.7 (90.9)	29.6 (85.3)	24.9 (76.8)	31.9 (89.4)
Mean daily minimum °C (°F)	12.4 (54.3)	15.4 (59.7)	20.6 (69.1)	24.2 (75.6)	26.0 (78.8)	27.2 (81.0)	26.9 (80.4)	26.9 (80.4)	26.4 (79.5)	23.9 (75.0)	19.1 (66.4)	14.2 (57.6)	21.9 (71.4)
Record low °C (°F)	4.2 (39.6)	5.0 (41.0)	10.8 (51.4)	13.1 (55.6)	14.5 (58.1)	19.5 (67.1)	22.4 (72.3)	20.1 (68.2)	21.5 (70.7)	15.4 (59.7)	11.1 (52.0)	3.9 (39.0)	3.9 (39.0)
Average rainfall mm (inches)	13.6 (0.54)	9.4 (0.37)	9.4 (0.37)	23.9 (0.94)	75.6 (2.98)	201.7 (7.94)	300.8 (11.84)	256.5 (10.10)	217.2 (8.55)	85.5 (3.37)	5.2 (0.20)	7.5 (0.30)	1,206.3 (47.49)
Average rainy days	1.1	1.2	0.9	1.8	4.7	8.9	14.0	11.7	9.6	3.4	0.5	0.7	58.5
Average relative humidity (%) (at 17:30 IST)	70	58	47	45	55	68	78	77	77	71	67	70	65
Source: India Meteorological Department

== Disasters ==
=== Floods ===
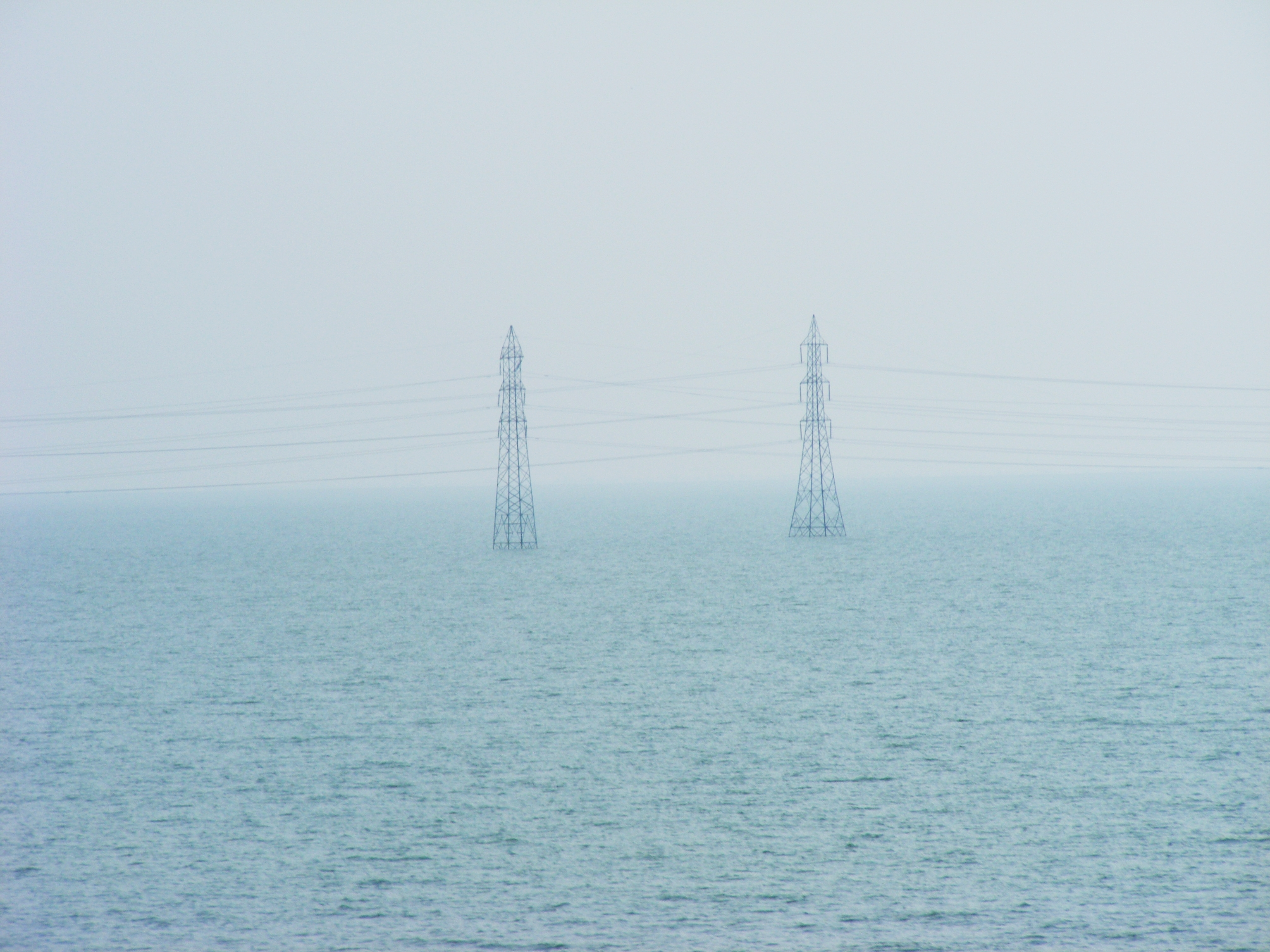
A view of the 2008 Bihar flood

The total numbers of deaths due to flooding in Bihar between 1979 and 2006 were: human deaths 5,874; animal deaths 19,044.

Bihar is India's most flood-prone state, with 76% of the population in northern Bihar living under the recurring threat of flood devastation. According to some historical data, 16.5% of the total flood-affected area in India is located in Bihar, while 22.1% of the flood-affected population in India lives in Bihar. About 68,800 square kilometres (26,600 sq mi) out of a total geographical area of 94,160 square kilometres (36,360 sq mi), comprising 73.06% of the state, is flood-affected.

== See also ==
- 1934 Nepal–Bihar earthquake
- Bengal famine of 1770
- Bihar famine of 1873–74
- Climate of India
- Climatic regions of India
- Geography of Bihar
- Golghar
