= Harahi Lake =

Lake in Bihar, India

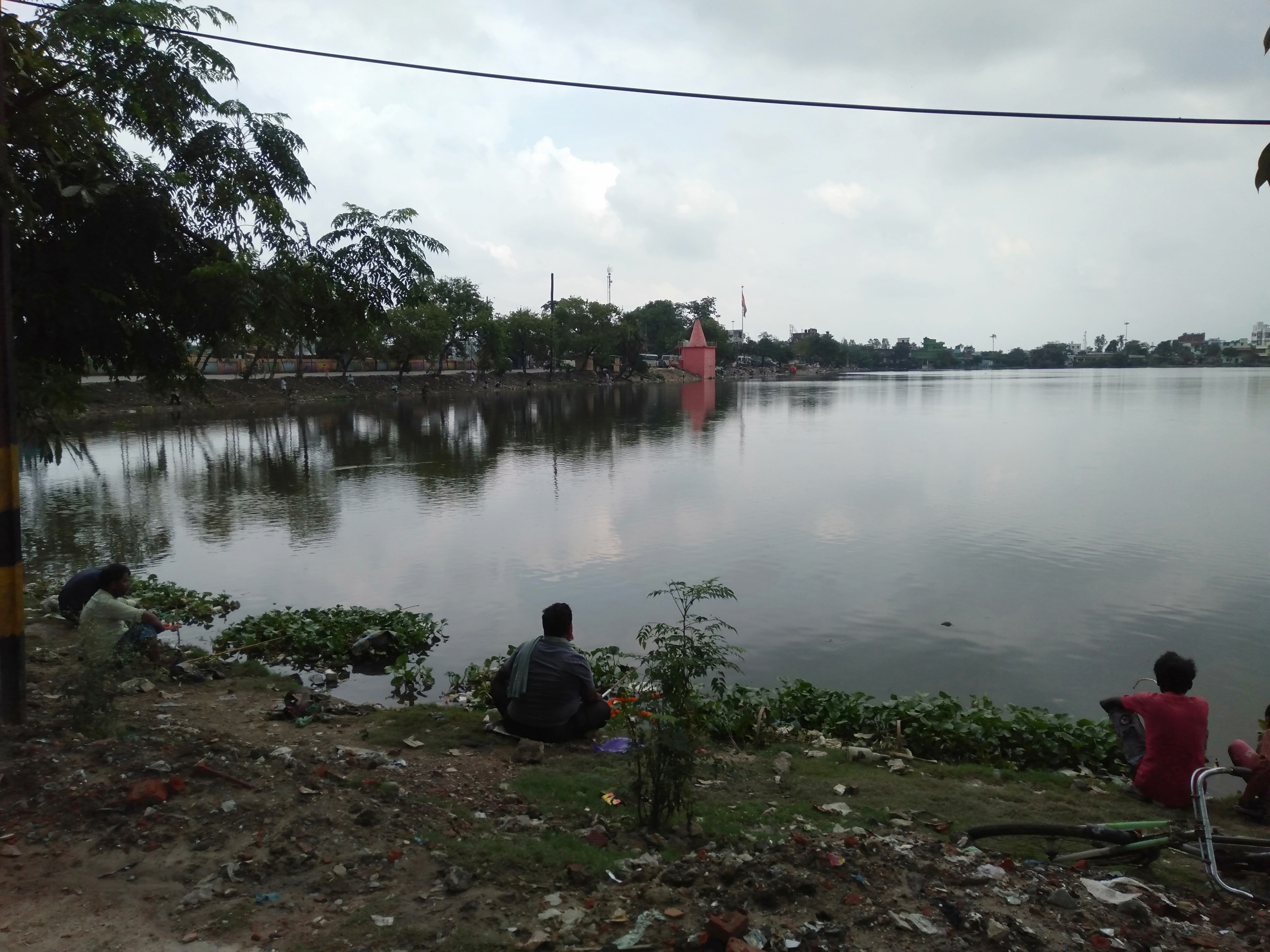
- Harahi Lake also known as Bone Lake at the time of Raj Darbhanga.

- Location within Bihar Location within India
- Location: Kathalbari, Darbhanga, Bihar, India
- Coordinates: 26.155944°N 85.905210°E
- Basin countries: India
- Max. length: 487.68 metres (1,600.0 ft)
- Max. width: 304.8 metres (1,000 ft)
- Settlements: Darbhanga

Harahi Lake (Hindi/Devanagari: हराही पोखर) is located near Darbhanga Railway Station, Darbhanga District, Bihar, India. There are two other lakes, Ganga Sagar Lake and Dighi Lake, which are situated in a line, with a drive passing from one to the other, and their united length is 6,000 feet. The Ganges Sagar Lake is the largest lake among these three. Its most distinguishing feature is the many large tanks, which give it a beautiful appearance during the rains. Harahi being 1,600 feet in length and 1,000 feet in width; Dighi 2,400 feet in length and 1,200 feet in width; the Ganga Sagar 2,000 feet length and 1,000 feet width.

== History ==
It has been conjectured that these were excavated in order to secure raised ground for soldiers' quarters, this theory resting on the belief that the town was once a Musalman cantonment.

== Legend ==
Local tradition holds that in the time of Raja Siva Singh, a fisherwoman was on her way to market, with a basket of fish on her head and accompanied by her daughter-in-law. A kite from a neighboring tree pounced down and carried away a fish from the basket. The daughter-in-law began to laugh and the Raja saw them arguing as he sat at his window. He sent for them and asked the younger woman the cause of her unseasonable laughter, but she begged to be excused, saying that if she told her story it would be certain death to her. The Raja's curiosity being roused, he insisted on hearing her reason. "In the reign of the king Yudhishthira," said the younger fisherwoman, "I was a kite. During the war of the Mahabharata, I carried away the arm of a woman, with a golden bracelet weighing 80 maunds (1 maund = 37.3242 Kg), and brought it here and ate it. I laughed at the thought of the petty greed of the puny kites of the present time, who do not mind pouncing down on a paltry fish." Saying this, she expired.

The Maharaja, curious to find out the truth of the story, ordered a series of tanks to be dug in the places pointed out. At last, his perseverance was rewarded by finding the skeleton of the arm, as well as the golden bracelet; and so the tank in which they were found was called Harahi or the Bone tank.
