= Devkhal Jheel =

Ancient location in the epic Mahabharata

- Devkhal Chaur
- Type: Lake
- Location: Bhagwanpur Kamala Panchayat, Ujiyarpur block, Samastipur district, Bihar, India
- Region: Mithila region

History
- Event: Yaksha Prashna

Devkhal Jheel is a lake believed to be the location where the dialogues between Yaksha and Yudhishthira took place in the epic Mahabharata. It is also known as Devkhal Chaur.

== Description ==
Devkhal Jheel is a lake in Bhagwanpur Kamala Panchayat in the Ujiyarpur block of the Samastipur district in the Mithila region of Bihar in India.

According to legend, the Devkhal Jheel was the location in the Mahabharata where the dialogues between Yaksha and Yudhishthira took place. It is said that the Pandavas had traveled by this route during their Agyaata Vaasa (unknown stay).

The Noon River flowing through the village is one of the sources of water for the lake.

== Excavations ==
In the year 2002, archaeological excavations were conducted here. The excavations uncovered some evidences of the Kushan period civilization. The archeologists involved in the excavations found some ancient walls ranging from 45 cm to one meter wide there. Several rare sculptures and other artifacts were recovered. Similarly, a piece of pottery with a Brahmi inscription was also discovered from the legendary lake.
