= List of Jamia Millia Islamia people =

This is a list of alumni and faculty of Jamia Millia Islamia.

== Faculty ==
Name	Introduction	Ref
Mini Shaji Thomas	Dean Faculty of Engineering and Technology, former Director NIT Trichy.	
A. Ramachandran	Artist and Former Professor of the Department of Art and Education.	
Akhtarul Wasey	Professor Emeritus Islamic Studies, former Head of the department of Islamic Studies and former Dean of the faculty of Humanities and Languages.	
Farhat Basir Khan	Professor of Photography	
Farida Abdulla Khan	Former Dean of the Education faculty of Jamia.	
Furqan Qamar	Professor of Management, Former Vice chancellor of Central University of Himachal Pradesh and Adviser to Planning Commission (Education)	
Gopi Chand Narang	Author and Former Professor of Urdu.	
Mohammad Mujeeb	Former VC of the Jamia.	
Mohammad Zahid Ashraf	Dean of Faculty of Life Sciences, recipient of N-BIOS Prize.	
Mukul Kesavan	Professor, Department of History, Jamia Millia Islamia	
Nuzhat Parveen Khan	Professor, Faculty of Law, Jamia Millia Islamia	
Shohini Ghosh	Director, AJK Mass Communication Research Centre	
Zafar Ahmad Nizami	Former head of the department of Political Science.	
Zayn al-Abidin Sajjad Meerthi	Professor of History and former head of the department of Islamic Studies.	

== Alumni ==
Name	Introduction	Ref
Abdul Lateef Azmi	Urdu litterateur	
Abul Kalam Qasmi	Urdu critic and former dean of the Faculty of Arts at the Aligarh Muslim University	
Afroz Alam Sahil	Editor at BeyondHeadlines	
Akanksha Damini Joshi	Filmmaker, cinematographer and photographer	
Akhlaqur Rahman Kidwai	Padma Vibhushan awardee, Former member of Rajya Sabha, Former governor of Bihar, Haryana, West Bengal	
Akhu Chingangbam	Lyricist, Singer and Founder of the folk-rock band Imphal Talkies and The Howlers	
Alankrita Shrivastava	Screenwriter and director	
Amanatullah Khan	Two time member of Delhi Legislative Assembly	
Amar Kanwar	Filmmaker	
Amit Dutt	Scientist, Geneticist, known for his studies on Fibroblast growth factor receptor	
Ampareen Lyngdoh	Member of Meghalaya Legislative Assembly since 2008	
Anjana Om Kashyap	Executive Editor at Aaj Tak	
Anwar Jamal	Documentary Filmmaker	
Anusha Shah	Civil engineer, 159th President of Institution of Civil Engineers	
Anuraadha Tewari	Screenwriter and director	
Aparna Sanyal	Film director and producer	
Arfa Khanum Sherwani	Senior Editor at The Wire	
Aseem Mishra	Cinematographer	
Barkha Dutt	News Anchor, Former Consulting Editor NDTV, Owner of MoJo	
Bharat Chikara	Hockey player	
Danish Aslam	Film director	
Danish Siddiqui	Photojounalist, Winner of Pulitzer Prize for Feature Photography	
Danish Mujtaba	Hockey Player	
Devesh Chauhan	Arjuna awardee, Hockey player	
Farida Khanam	Islamic Scholar, Professor, Peace Activist	
Gagan Ajit Singh	Arjuna Awardee, Hockey Player	
Gayathri Prabhu	Novelist	
Gul Khan	TV Producer and director	
Gurwinder Singh	Hockey Player	
Habib Faisal	Film Writer and director	
Harish Chandra Burnwal	Writer, journalist, lyricist and bhajan singer.	
Harsh Chhaya	Television and Bollywood Film Actor	
Hasina Jalal	Afghan activist	
Hemant Chaturvedi	Cinematographer	
Hindol Sengupta	Historian and Journalist	
Imran Hussain	Two time member of Delhi Legislative Assembly, cabinet minister in Delhi government	
Imran Raza Ansari	Former Cabinet Minister in Jammu & Kashmir	
Jai Prakash	Indian Wrestler, 1984 Olympian	
Janaki Sabesh	Actress	
Javed Ali Khan	Former member of Rajya Sabha	
Kabir Khan	Film director	
Kamlesh Kumar Singh	Hockey Player	
Kiran Rao	Film director and actress	
Kamal Akhtar	Former Cabinet Minister in Uttar Pradesh government, Former Rajya Sabha member	
Kuldeep Singh	Hockey Player	
Kunal Majumder	Journalist and academic	
Kunwar Danish Ali	Member of Lok Sabha	
Loveleen Tandan	Film director (Slumdog Millionaire)	
Mahmud Hussain	Member of Pakistan Movement, First Constituent Assembly	
Mairaj Ahmad Khan	Skeet Shooter, Olympian	
Mandeep Antil	Hockey Player	
Mayukh Hazarika	Playback singer and music director	
Meem Afzal	Former Member of Rajya Sabha	
Meena Kotwal	Journalist, and the founder of The Mooknayak	
Meenu Gaur	British-Indian director and screenwriter	
Mohammad Hossein Adeli	Iranian Politician, Diplomat, Economist, Secretary General at Gas Exporting Countries Forum	
Marya Shakil	Television journalist & news anchor	
Masud Husain Khan	Linguist, first Professor Emeritus in Social Sciences at AMU and the fifth Vice-Chancellor of the Jamia	
Mohammad Alvi	Urdu Poet	
Mohammad Najeeb Qasmi	Islamic Scholar	
Mohammad Zahid Ashraf	Recipient of National Bioscience Award for Career Development	
Mohibbullah	Member of Parliament	
Muazzam Beg	Bollywood film writer and director	
Muzaffar Alam	Professor at University of Chicago	
Mouni Roy	Actress	
Naved Aslam	Film & Television Actor, Writer	
Nidhi Bisht	Actress	
Nishtha Jain	Film Director and producer	
Nitin Kumar	Hockey Player	
Natasha Badhwar	Journalist, Author and Documentary filmmaker	
Neelum Sharma	Nari Shakti Puraskar 2019, Doordarshan Anchor/Journalist	
Neha Dixit	Independent Journalist and Author	
Nitin Kumar	Professional Darts Player	
Nuzhat Parveen Khan	Professor of Law, Dean at School of Law, Bennett University and former Dean at Faculty of Law, Jamia Millia Islamia	
Parvez Sharma	Filmmaker, Author, and Journalist	
Prashant Pandey	Writer Director	
Pir Ilahi Bux	Prominent Member of Pakistan Movement and Second Chief Minister of Sindh	
Pranab Kumar Aich	Documentary Filmmaker, Photographer	
Prabhjot Singh	Arjuna awardee, Hockey player	
Prerna Bhambri	National Level Tennis Player	
Raqib Hameed Naik	Journalist, founder of Hindutva Watch	
Raziuddin Aquil	Historian and academic	
Rintu Thomas	Academy Award nominated filmmaker	
Ritu Kapur	Media Entrepreneur	
Rahimuddin Khan	Retired four star general of Pakistan Army, Former Governor of Balochistan and Sindh	
Rakesh Sharma	Documentary Filmmaker	
Rameez Nemat	First-class cricketer	
Ritesh Shah	Screenwriter	
Roshan Abbas	Radio Jockey / Film Director	
Saba Mumtaz	Television Writer and producer.	
Sanjeev K Jha	Screenwriter / Filmmaker	
Shah Alam	Activist, Documentary Filmmaker and Founder of Awam ka Cinema	
Shah Rukh Khan	Actor	
Shakeel Ahmed	Scientist	
Shalu Nigam	Lawyer, Legal Scholar and Author	
Shashwati Talukdar	New York-based Academic-Filmmaker	
Shaunak Sen	Academy award nominated filmmaker	
Suhaib Ilyasi	Television Producer and director	
Surender Kumar	Hockey Player	
Syed Hassan	Educationist	
Syed Sahil Agha	Writer and Dastangoi Performer	
Satpal Tanwar	Founder of Akhil Bhartiya Bhim Sena	
Shah Alam	Two time member of Uttar Pradesh Legislative Assembly	
Shazia Ilmi	Television journalist and spokesperson of Bharatiya Janta Party	
S. Y. Quraishi	17th Chief Election Commissioner of India	
S.A. Lalli	Economics Author and Professor at University of Delhi	
Syed Hassan	Nobel Peace Prize nominee, Padma Shri awardee	
Tabish Mehdi	Indian poet, literary critic and writer	
Tsering Rhitar Sherpa	Nepalese Film Director and producer	
Tushar Khandekar	Hockey Player	
Vikas Jain	Co-founder and Business Director, Micromax	
Vinod Jose	Investigative Journalist, Executive Editor at The Caravan	
Virender Sehwag	Cricketer	
Wasiq Khan	Bollywood Production Designer and art director	
Yasin Mazhar Siddiqi	Director of the Institute of Islamic Studies of Aligarh Muslim University	
Zeishan Quadri	Writer, actor, Gangs of Wasseypur	
Munna Khalid	Indian para-badminton athlete	
Zubair Khan	Three time Member of the Legislative Assembly	
Zulfiquarulla	Former Member of Lok Sabha	
Meeran Haider	Activist	
Javed Ali Khan	Member of Rajya Sabha	
