= Nuzhat =

Nuzhat (Arabic: نزهة, romanized: Nuzha, Hebrew: נוזהת, romanized: Nuzhaṯ, Persian: نزهت, romanized: Nuzhat, Urdu: نزہت, romanized: Nuzhat, Hindi: नुज़हत, romanized: Nuzhat) is a feminine given name of Arabic origin. Notable people with the name include:

== Given name ==
- Nuzhat Husain, Indian pathologist
- Nuzhat Katzav (1932–2022), Israeli politician
- Nuzhat Kazmi (born 1957), Indian art historian
- Nuzhat Parveen Khan (born 1964), Indian academic and author
- Nuzhat Parween (born 1996), Indian cricketer
- Nuzhat Pathan (born 1965), Pakistani politician
- Nuzhat Sadiq, Pakistani politician
- Nuzhat Tasnia (born 1996), Bangladeshi cricketer

== Notable people with Nuzhat as a surname ==
- Shaista Nuzhat (born 1963), Punjabi linguist
