= Afroz Alam Sahil =

Indian journalist and author (born 1987)

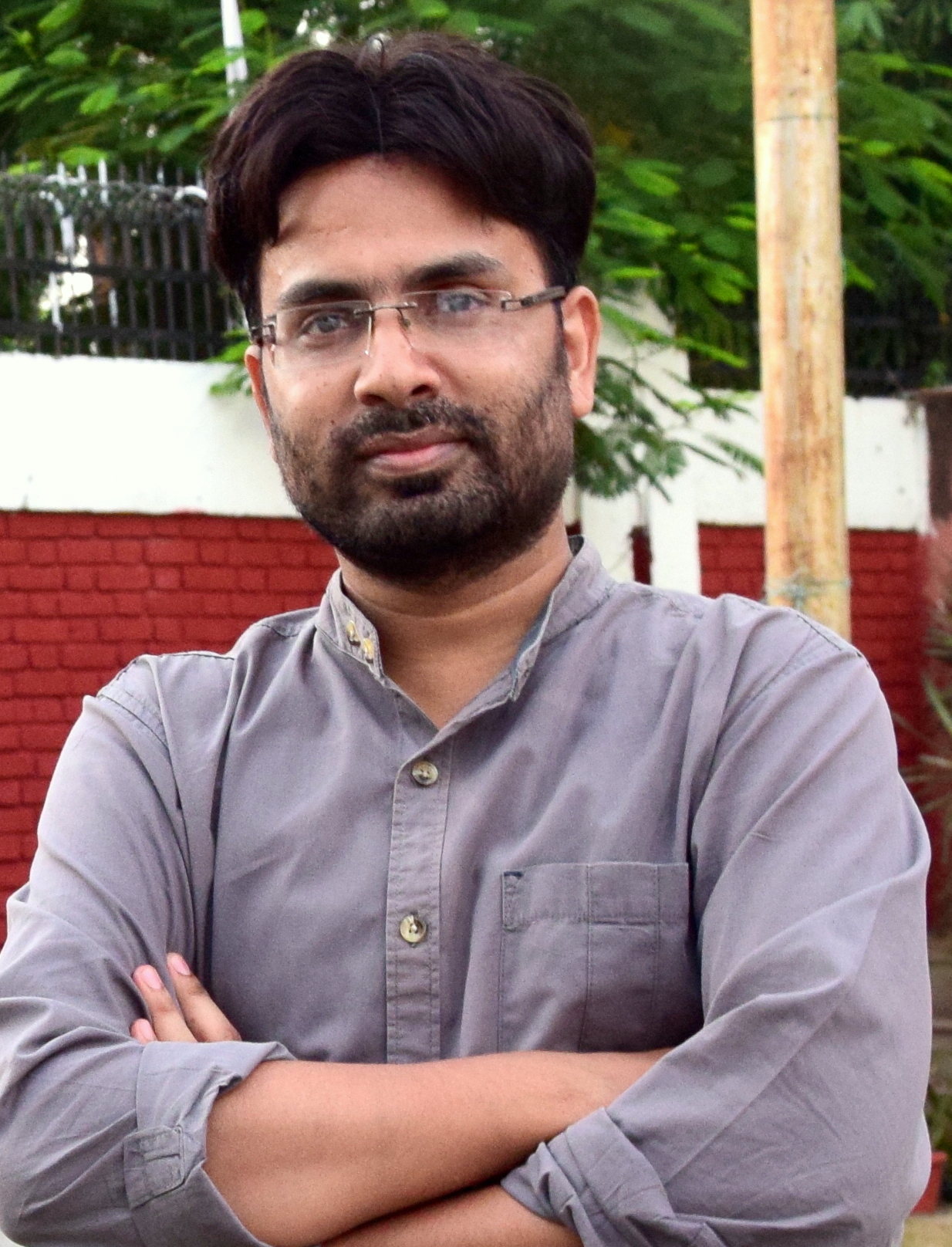
- Afroz Alam Sahil in New Delhi
- Born: Afroz Alam; 1987 (age 38–39); Bettiah, West Champaran district, Bihar
- Education: Jamia Millia Islamia
- Alma mater: A.J.K. Mass Communication Research Centre, Jamia Millia Islamia; New Delhi
- Occupations: Journalist, writer
- Website: www.afrozsahil.in

Afroz Alam Sahil (born 1987) is an Indian writer and RTI journalist. He is the founder and editor of Beyond Headlines (BH), an independent online news portal focused on marginalized communities, minorities, and social issues. Sahil is known for his investigative journalism and activism, particularly using RTI to uncover information on government policies, corruption, and social injustices.

== Early life and education ==
Afroz Alam Sahil was born in Bettiah, West Champaran, Bihar, in 1987. He moved to Delhi in 2005 to pursue a bachelor's degree in Mass Media at Jamia Millia Islamia. Later, he joined the university's Mass Communication Research Centre (MCRC) for further studies in journalism and documentary filmmaking.

After the 2008 Mumbai attacks, Sahil, who was then a student at Jamia Millia Islamia, highlighted the housing discrimination faced by Muslim students in Delhi. He stated that many Muslim students from Uttar Pradesh and Bihar were denied housing and struggled to find accommodation, with some even dropping out due to these difficulties. In a 2009 interview with The Washington Post, he recalled his personal experience, saying, "Why was I born a Muslim?" when he saw increasing suspicion against his community.

== Journalistic career ==
Sahil has reported on issues related to Indian minorities and marginalized communities over the past 15 years and is currently based in Istanbul, Turkey.

=== Beyond Headlines ===
In 2010, Sahil co-founded Beyond Headlines, an independent news platform focusing on issues that mainstream media often overlooks. Based in Batla House, Jamia Nagar, New Delhi, the platform covers topics related to minorities, farmers, workers, and marginalized communities. The organization operates without any permanent employees and relies on voluntary contributions.

Sahil has stated that he founded Beyond Headlines due to his dissatisfaction with the editorial policies of mainstream media, which he felt were influenced by corporate and political interests. His platform focuses on reporting news from a perspective that highlights marginalized voices.

=== RTI journalism and investigative reporting ===
Sahil's RTI journalism has led to various challenges, including threats and legal notices. In an interview, he revealed that he received threatening calls after filing an RTI against a Bihar Member of Parliament regarding the use of public funds. He also stated that students using RTI are sometimes targeted with defamation notices from universities.

In 2010, Sahil obtained an autopsy report through the Right to Information (RTI) Act regarding the 2008 Batla House encounter case. The report stated that one of the deceased, Ameen, had died due to "shock and haemorrhage as a result of multiple injuries." Sahil raised questions about the official account, as the police claimed Ameen sustained these injuries after falling while trying to flee the Batla House apartment.

Later, in 2013, Sahil questioned the Delhi Sessions Court's verdict, which convicted Shahzad Ahmad for the murder of Inspector M.C. Sharma during the same encounter. He argued that while the court had delivered its judgment, legal avenues for appeal were still open.

In 2010, Sahil also filed an RTI that revealed the Prime Minister's Office (PMO) had spent over ₹11.9 lakh on subscriptions for 45 magazines and 43 daily newspapers during the financial year 2009–2010. This disclosure highlighted government media consumption and expenditure patterns. Among his notable RTI findings, Sahil discovered that the PMO spent ₹12 lakh on newspaper and magazine subscriptions in 2009–2010, an expenditure that was revealed through his RTI request.

In 2011, Sahil filed an RTI application seeking details of the communication between the Ministry of External Affairs (MEA) and the Central Bureau of Investigation (CBI) regarding the extradition of Warren Anderson, then chief of Union Carbide, in connection with the Bhopal gas tragedy. As a result of his application, the Central Information Commission (CIC) overruled the MEA's objections and directed it to disclose all related information, citing significant public interest and stating that the sub judice status of the case could not justify withholding records from public disclosure.

In 2014, a French news channel, France 24, featured Sahil in a report highlighting his RTI-based investigative work. The report stated that his RTI requests to India's Ministry of Health led to a significant reduction in the prices of over 315 essential medicines, with costs dropping between 30% and 70%. This allowed ordinary citizens greater access to affordable healthcare. France 24 recognized Sahil as one of the activists using the RTI Act to combat corruption and promote government transparency.

In December 2012, Sahil co-founded Insaan International Foundation, a non-profit organization aimed at educating citizens about the Right to Information (RTI) Act and assisting them in effectively following up on their applications. The initiative was launched to empower individuals to demand transparency in governance and to counter bureaucratic obstacles faced by RTI applicants.

In 2013, he expressed skepticism about the Central Information Commission (CIC) ruling that brought political parties under RTI scrutiny. He pointed out that RTI queries are routinely denied and CIC hearings take years to materialize, making transparency difficult to achieve.

Sahil has been vocal about the historical significance of the Right to Information (RTI) Act and its role in exposing corruption. He has argued that, contrary to popular belief, RTI was not solely an activist-led movement but was also advocated by the Press Council of India, which pushed for greater transparency in governance. In a 2019 interview, he stated, "Many think that RTI was a movement started by a lot of activists. If you look at history, it was the Press Council of India who demanded a tool for seeking information and more transparency."

Sahil has emphasized the RTI Act's crucial role in enabling journalists to hold the government accountable. In 2019, he reiterated the need for strengthening RTI laws to prevent government opacity.

Through investigative reports, Sahil highlighted the neglect of B. R. Ambedkar's historical artifacts, revealing their deterioration due to bureaucratic delays despite multiple official correspondences over the years.

In 2015, Sahil reported on the growing backlog of RTI appeals and complaints at the Central Information Commission (CIC), highlighting delays that could extend up to several years.

=== Investigations on Waqf Properties ===
Sahil has extensively investigated issues concerning Waqf properties, particularly in connection with the Delhi Waqf Board. His efforts through the RTI uncovered significant discrepancies in official waqf records. In 2008, the Delhi Waqf Board listed 1,964 waqf properties in the city, but a federal government statement in 2025 reduced that number to just 1,047.

Similarly, the number of cemeteries managed by the board has shown a marked decline. While earlier records claimed over 500 cemeteries, later RTI replies indicated only around 400 remained registered, and board officials ultimately acknowledged that merely 70–80 were effectively under their supervision.

Sahil noted that despite the 2013 amendments to the Waqf Act intended to close legal loopholes, issues such as bureaucratic mismanagement and encroachments remained widespread. He emphasized that while the number of listed waqf properties increased due to survey efforts, such data was often misrepresented, and enforcement against illegal occupations remained lax.

In April 2025, Sahil published a report based on his research visit to Turkey, directly challenging claims made by some Indian political leaders that waqf institutions no longer exist in Islamic countries. He documented how Turkey's waqf system, managed by the Directorate General of Foundations, not only persists but plays a central role in social and economic development. His report detailed various types of waqf, including state-sponsored and minority endowments, and contrasted them with the governance challenges facing India's waqf framework.

=== Investigations on Urdu libraries ===
Sahil has also reported on the declining condition of Urdu libraries in India. In 2015, he wrote an investigative piece for BBC Hindi about the deteriorating state of the Anjuman Taraqqi Urdu library in Patna, Bihar. Once a hub for intellectuals and writers, the library had fallen into disrepair, with rare books and manuscripts either lost or damaged. According to his report, the premises had been encroached upon and were being used for non-literary purposes.

=== Investigation into political funding ===
In 2010, Sahil also revealed through an RTI application that the BJP, while publicly criticising the Congress government for handling the Bhopal gas tragedy and demanding strict action against those responsible, had itself accepted a donation of ₹1 lakh from Dow Chemicals during the financial year 2006–2007. Dow Chemicals had acquired Union Carbide, the company responsible for the Bhopal disaster. The revelation raised questions about political parties' funding sources and potential conflicts of interest.

In 2015, Sahil published an investigative report on BBC Hindi exposing that the Bharatiya Janata Party (BJP) had received donations from beef-exporting companies. According to his report, Maharashtra-based Frigorifico Allana Private Limited donated ₹50 lakh to BJP in 2014–15 through cheque. Another meat-exporting company, Indagro Foods Limited, contributed ₹75 lakh in the same financial year. The report also noted a ₹50 lakh donation from Frigerio Conserva Allana Limited. When questioned about these donations, BJP spokespersons stated that they were unaware of the specifics.

=== Media analysis and international reporting ===
In June 2025, Sahil wrote in The Wire about how some Indian news outlets misrepresented reports related to Eid al-Adha in Turkey, Morocco, and Nepal, highlighting patterns of misinformation and communal framing in media coverage.

=== Recent coverage ===
In September 2025, Sahil published a feature in The Wire highlighting the experiences of Gaza-based photojournalist Momen Faiz during the Israel–Gaza conflict. The article, part of the series Gaza Stories: Voices Under Siege, documented the challenges faced by journalists reporting under siege and emphasised the global responsibility of media professionals to bear witness.

In the same month, Clarion India published an opinion piece by journalist Mohammad Alamullah crediting Sahil's early investigative work for exposing inconsistencies in the 2008 Batla House encounter case and for continuing to raise questions about justice and accountability in its aftermath.

== Literary works ==
Afroz Alam Sahil has authored several books on politics, history, and human rights. His notable works include:

- Janne Ka Haq: Suchana Ka Adhikar - Ek Margdarshika (in Hindi) – A guidebook on the Right to Information (RTI) Act in India.
- Pir Muhammad Munis (2015) (in Hindi) – A biography of Pir Muhammad Munis, highlighting his contributions to journalism and the Champaran Satyagraha.
- Sheikh Gulab: Neel Andolan ke Ek Nayak (2017) (in Hindi) – A historical account of Sheikh Gulab and his role in the Champaran Indigo Movement.
- Professor Abdul Bari: Azadi Ki Ladayi Ka Ek Krantikari Yodha (2019) (in Hindi) – A biography of Abdul Bari and his contributions to India's independence movement.
- Jamia Aur Gandhi (2019) (in Hindi) – Explores Mahatma Gandhi's association with Jamia Millia Islamia and his contributions to the institution.
- Lockdown Diaries: Corona Kaal ke 68 Din (2021) (in Hindi) – A collection of his personal observations and analyses during the COVID-19 lockdown in India.

== Media contributions ==
Sahil has contributed to various media outlets, including BBC Hindi, The Print, The Wire, India Times, Down to Earth, National Herald, Navjivan, and TwoCircles. He has also worked with TV9 Mumbai and UNI TV.

== Awards and recognition ==
Sahil has received over 20 awards and fellowships for his contributions to journalism and RTI activism. In 2011, he was honored with the "TCN Person of the Year 2010" award by TwoCircles.net for his efforts in using RTI to promote transparency and accountability.

== See also ==
- List of Indian journalists
- List of Jamia Millia Islamia people
- Champaran
