= Benazir Bhutto: A Multidimensional Portrait =

2015 political biography by Anna Suvorova

- Author: Anna Suvorova
- Language: English
- Subject: Benazir Bhutto; Politics of Pakistan
- Genre: Political biography
- Publisher: Oxford University Press Pakistan
- Publication date: 26 March 2015
- Publication place: Pakistan
- Media type: Print
- Pages: 314
- ISBN: 978-0-19-940172-7

Benazir Bhutto: A Multidimensional Portrait is a 2015 political biography by Anna Suvorova about Pakistani politician Benazir Bhutto. Published in English by Oxford University Press Pakistan, it was first issued in Russian in 2013 before appearing in English translation in 2015.

The book presents Bhutto's life through an anthropological and intellectual lens, situating her career within the history of the Bhutto family, the condition of women in Pakistan, and the wider political and social life of the country. It is based on Bhutto's own books, articles, and speeches, as well as the author's interviews with people close to her.

== Synopsis ==
The book is divided into ten chapters, including "Women and Power", "Heiress to a Glorious Clan", "Being a Woman in Pakistan", "Myths and Facts", "A Life Not Chosen", "Triumphal Return", "The Clash of Civilizations", "Sibling Position", "Into the Same River Twice", and "The Story Ends; Begins the Legend".

The first third of the book is less a conventional biography than a broad discussion of the Bhutto family background and of gendered violence and social constraints in Pakistan, including honour killings, acid attacks, and the case of Mukhtaran Mai. Suvorova uses this material to frame the difficulties faced by a woman seeking political authority in Pakistan.

The later chapters trace Bhutto's upbringing in Sindh and Karachi, her education at Radcliffe College and the University of Oxford, her imprisonment and political struggle after the overthrow and execution of Zulfikar Ali Bhutto, her two terms as prime minister, her marriage to Asif Ali Zardari, her rivalry with other members of the Bhutto family, and the transformation of her public image after her assassination in 2007.

== Reception ==
Reviewing the book in Dawn, Nadya Chishty-Mujahid wrote that Suvorova went beyond a routine political biography by attempting a holistic portrait of Bhutto's personality and political role. She praised the book's interdisciplinary range and its balanced treatment of Asif Zardari, but criticized it for weak documentation, insufficient depth, and an overreliance on the commentaries of Tariq Ali.

In The Book Review, Priyanka Singh called the book "a useful addition" to the literature on Bhutto and said that it offered a detailed analysis of the turning points in her life, especially the ways in which family inheritance, gender, and Pakistan's political culture shaped her choices. Singh also noted the book's effort to explain how Bhutto combined a Western liberal outlook with the religious and social expectations of Pakistani public life.

The book was also reviewed by Vladimir Braginsky in the Journal of the Royal Asiatic Society and Ajay Darshan Behera in the History and Sociology of South Asia in 2016.
