= Sasikumar =

Sasikumar or Sasi Kumar may refer to:

- B. Sasikumar (born 1949), Carnatic violinist, teacher, and composer from Kerala
- G. Sasikumar, Tamil film editor
- J. Sasikumar (1927–2014), Malayalam film director
- M. Sasikumar (born 1974), Tamil film director, actor and producer
- R. Sasikumar, a Singaporean former footballer and sports marketing executive
- Sasikumar, Tamil film and theatre actor
- Sashi Kumar, media personality from Kerala
- Sashikumar Subramani, Tamil film actor
- Shashi Kumar (born 1965), Kannada film actor
- Vinayak Sasikumar (born 1994), Indian lyricist, best known for his works in Malayalam cinema
- V. Sasikumar (born 1961), Politician from Kerala. Former MLA of Perinthalmanna.
