= Akhu Chingangbam =

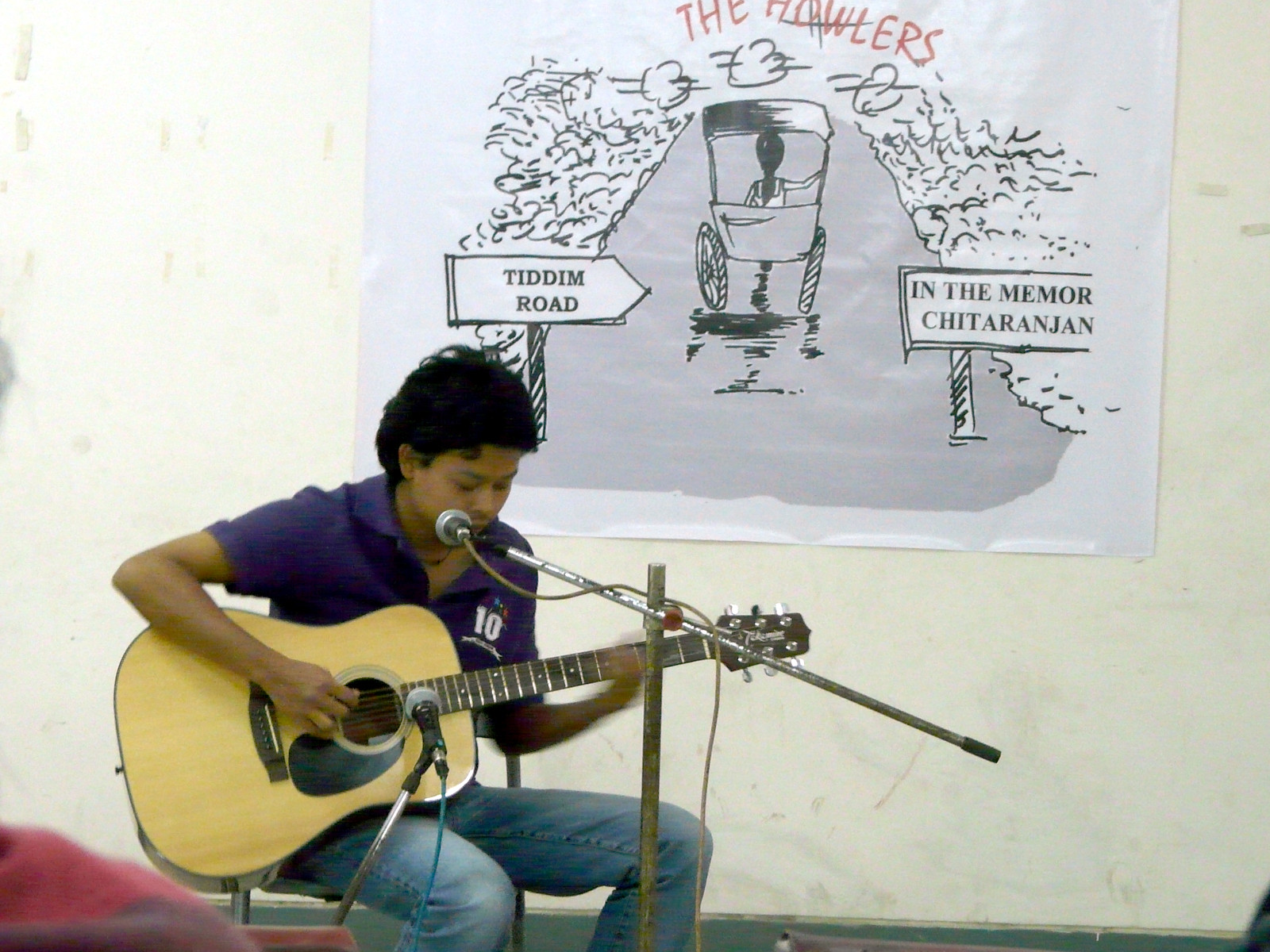
- Akhu performing at the release of his first album, in 2009.

Background information
- Also known as: Akhu
- Born: Ronid Chingangbam; Imphal, Manipur
- Genre: Folk-Rock
- Occupations: Vocalist, Social Activist
- Instrument: Guitar
- Years active: 2008 - Present
- Member of: Imphal Talkies and The Howlers

Ronid Chingangbam or Akhu Chingangbam is a lyricist, singer and founder of the folk-rock band Imphal Talkies and The Howlers. Recently he signed a joint Human right activists statement demanding immediate release of the student activist Rinshad Reera in Kerala.

== Personal life ==
Akhu is son of Mr. Ch. Ramkumar and Mrs. Th. Tamphamani. He hails from Khurai Thangjam Leikai, Imphal East, Manipur, India. He acquired a doctorate in Physics from Jamia Milia Islamia University, New Delhi in 2012. He completed a post-doctoral assignment on Cosmology in The Institute for Fundamental Study, Naresuan University, Thailand. On World Music Day 2016, he lost his hearing in one ear in an accident.

== Band ==
The Imphal Talkies and The Howlers was started in 2008 with Sachidananda Angom, Irom Singthoi, Chaoba Thiyam and Karnajit Laishram.

== Projects ==
Akhu also appeared on the second season of The Dewarists. He has also initiated a project for the musicians of the world to meet at one platform by the name, "Imphal Music Project". In May 2015, he started a music project with the help of Foundation for Social Transformation (FST) for children of Manipur by the name "A Native Tongue Called Peace". His band, Imphal Talkies, was one of the 32 bands chosen from 32 countries by in Place of War and Unconvention (United Kingdom) for the Album of the Revolution in 2013.
