= Government College, Malappuram =

College in Kerala, India

- Motto: "Tejasvi navadhitamastu"
- Type: Undergraduate college Public college
- Established: 1972; 54 years ago
- Affiliations: University of Calicut
- Principal: Dr. Geetha Nambiar
- Location: Munduparamba, Malappuram, Kerala, 676509, India; 11.0570575°N 76.0947873°E
- Campus: Urban
- Website: gcmalappuram.ac.in
- Location within Kerala Location within India

Government College, Malappuram, is a general degree college located in Malappuram, Kerala. It was established in 1972. The college is affiliated with Calicut University. This college offers different courses in arts, commerce and science.

== Accreditation ==
The college is recognized by the University Grants Commission (UGC).

== Student activism ==
In February 2019 Kerala police arrested two students for allegedly protesting against sangh parivar.

Human rights organisations and Activists had taken a strong stand against the arrest of the students. They released a joint statement signed by the group of activists, lawyers, journalists demanding immediate release of the Student Activists.

== Notable alumni ==
- A. Vijayaraghavan, Ex.MP
- V. Sasikumar, Ex-MLA
- Rinshad Reera, Student Activist

== See also ==
- Education in India
- Education in Kerala
- List of institutions of higher education in Kerala
- List of colleges affiliated to the University of Calicut
