= Farida Abdulla Khan =

Indian academic

Professor Farida Abdulla Khan
- Born: 7 December 1951 (age 74); Punjab
- Education: PhD
- Alma mater: Panjab University, City University of New York, University of Paris, Punjab University
- Occupation: Professor
- Employer: Jamia Millia Islamia
- Title: Member of National Commission for Minorities

Farida Abdulla Khan (born 7 December 1951) is currently a professor in the Department of Educational Studies at Jamia Millia Islamia (JMI), Delhi, India. She is also the managing editor of Contemporary Dialogue in Education by Sage. Earlier, She was a former Dean of Education at JMI. She has taught in many institutes, including Delhi University and Jawaharlal Nehru University (JNU).

== Early life and education ==
Khan obtained an undergraduate degree in 1971 and an MA in psychology in 1973 from Panjab University, Chandigarh. She earned a masters in developmental psychology from the City University of New York in 1989 and a PhD in developmental psychology at the Graduate Center of the City University of New York in 1994.

== Career ==
During 1990-96, Khan taught psychology at Lady Shri Ram College and Jesus and Mary College of the University of Delhi. In between she went to New York to complete her PhD.

In October 1996, Khan joined Jawaharlal Nehru University as Assistant Professor in the Zakir Husain Centre for Educational Studies. In January 2002, she moved to the University of Delhi as Reader in the Department of Education. In October 2006 she joined Jamia Millia Islamia as Professor in the Faculty of Education.

During the 2005 National Curriculum Framework exercise, Khan was a member of the National Focus Group on the Teaching of Mathematics. In 2011, she was appointed as a member of the Task Force on Research and Evaluation by National Advisory Council. Since 2013, she has also been a member of the National Commission for Minorities. She actively writes on Kashmir issues and educational issues of backward communities and minorities.

== See also ==
- List of Jamia Millia Islamia people
