= Raqib Hameed Naik =

Kashmiri journalist

- Born: Jammu and Kashmir, India
- Occupations: Executive Director, ex-Journalist
- Organisation(s): Center for the Study of Organized Hate (CSOH), Hindutva Watch
- Awards: Eva Lassman “Take Action Against Hate” Award 2024
- Website: csohate.org

Raqib Hameed Naik (born 1995) is a former journalist and an expert on organized hate, far-right extremism, disinformation and online harms, He is the executive director of the Center for the Study of Organized Hate (CSOH), a nonprofit, nonpartisan think tank based in Washington, D.C.

Earlier, he founded Hindutva Watch, a research project described as India’s only operational hate tracker that documents hate crimes and hate speeches against religious minorities, particularly Christians and Muslims in India, and India Hate Lab, which studies hate speech, disinformation, and conspiracy theories targeting religious minorities.Naik is also a Fellow at Bard College’s Human Rights Project and at the Political Conflict, Gender and People’s Rights Initiative at the University of California, Berkeley..

== Early life and education ==
Raqib was born to Kashmiri parents in Jammu and Kashmir. He did his early schooling Sri Ranbir Higher Secondary School, Jammu. He moved to Srinagar to complete his undergraduate studies at Amar Singh College. He then attended University of Bolton in 2018, to study International Multimedia Journalism.

== Career ==
Raqib started his career as a staff reporter with Twocircles.net, where he stayed until 2017. In his early career, he was based in Kashmir. Later he reported from different Indian states. He was guest editor at Beyond Headlines. In 2018, he joined The Globe Post as its Indian correspondent. Naik has been featured and quoted in various news outlets for his reporting, including The New York Times, CNN, Time Magazine, Financial Times, New York Magazine, The Washington Post, The Wall Street Journal, The Guardian, Los Angeles Times, Al Jazeera, Reuters, and Rolling Stone, The Intercept, BBC, Daily Express, TechCrunch, Forbes, Voice of America, Vox, Wired, and NPR.

=== X Censorship Case ===
In January 2024, the Indian government geo-blocked the X (formerly Twitter) handle of Hindutva Watch, followed by the blocking of its website along with India Hate Lab. The government issued blocking notices under Section 69A of the controversial Information Technology Act.

In April 2024, Naik petitioned the Delhi High Court to challenge the illegal, arbitrary, and disproportionate blocking of Hindutva Watch’s X account and both websites. The petition named the Union of India and X Corp, the company owned by Elon Musk that manages X.

In September 2024, X Corp, for the first time in India, filed an affidavit in the Delhi High Court in support of Naik, calling the Indian government’s blocking order a “disproportionate and unreasonable restriction.”

=== Awards ===
Raqib won the Eva Lassman “Take Action Against Hate” Award by Gonzaga University in 2024, and was earlier shortlisted for the Thomson Foundation Award
