= Anna Suvorova =

Russian orientalist and art critic (born 1949)

Anna A. Suvorova
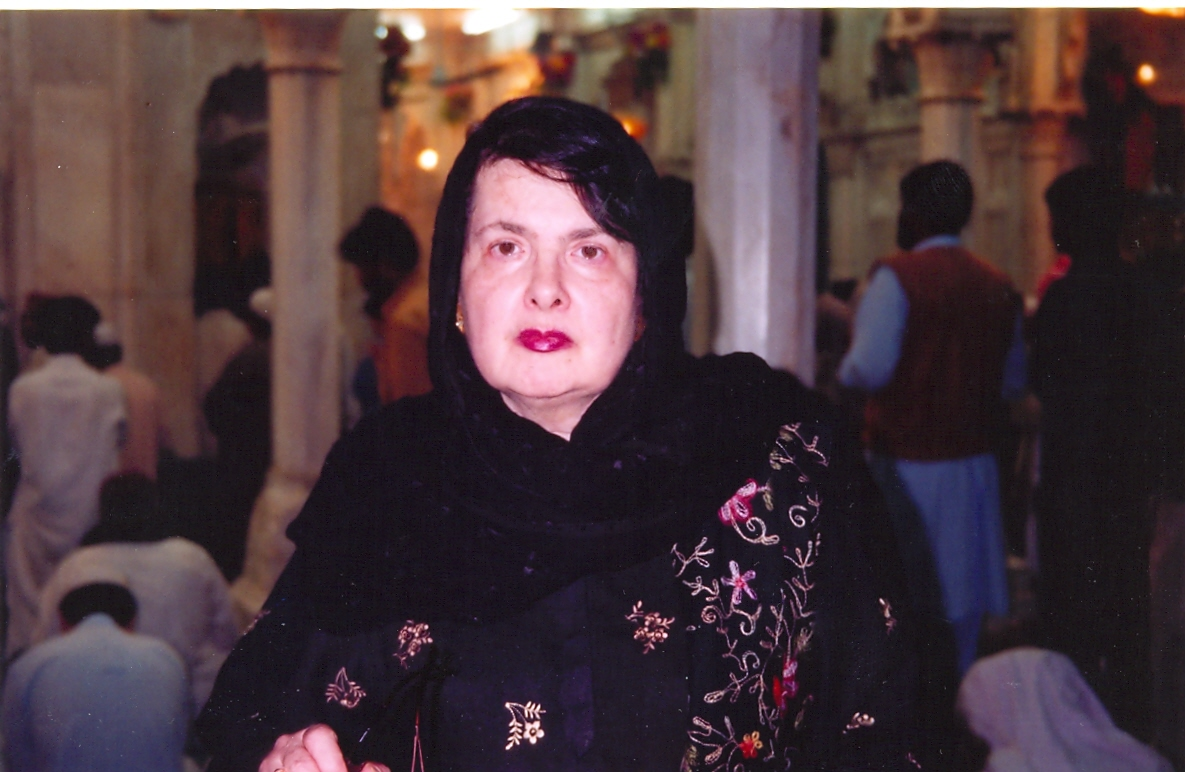
- Suvarova, February 2009
- Born: 11 January 1949; Moscow, USSR
- Died: 23 November 2023 (aged 74)
- Occupations: orientalist, art critic
- Known for: bilingual: Russian, Urdu
- Awards: Sitara-i-Imtiaz (Pakistan)

Anna A. Suvorova (11 January 1949 – 23 November 2023) was a Russian orientalist and art critic. She was bilingual in Russian and Urdu.

== Biography ==
Suvorova was the Head of the Department of Asian Literature at the Institute of Oriental Studies (Russian Academy of Sciences), Professor of Indo-Islamic culture at the Institute of Oriental and classical cultures (Russian State University for the Humanities), member of the International faculty in National College of Arts (Pakistan), fellow of Academic Advisory Board, Centre for Study of Gender and Culture (Pakistan), fellow of Royal Asiatic Society (UK).

Areas of professional interest: South-Asian premodern literature, Islam in the Indian subcontinent, Sufism, South-Asian performing and visual arts.

For her contribution to the research of Pakistani literature and cultural heritage she has been conferred one of the highest state awards of Pakistan — Sitara-i-Imtiaz.

== Selected works ==
- Masnavi: A Study of Urdu Romance. — Karachi: Oxford University Press, 2000.
- Muslim Saints of South Asia: the eleventh to fifteenth century. — London—N.Y.: Routledge, 2004.
- Barr-e saghir ke awliya aur unke mazar. — Lahore: Mashaal, 2007
- Early Urdu Theatre: traditions and transformations. — Lahore: National College of Arts, 2009.
- A new wave of Indian inspiration. Translations from Urdu in Malay Traditional Literature and Theatre.
- Naya Drama in India: Rediscovering the Self in the Western Mirror.
- Lahore: Topophilia of Space and Place. - Karachi: Oxford University Press, 2011
- Benazir Bhutto: A Multidimensional Portrait
- Widows and Daughters: Gender, Kinship, and Power in South Asia
