= Nuzhat Kazmi =

Indian art historian (born 1957)

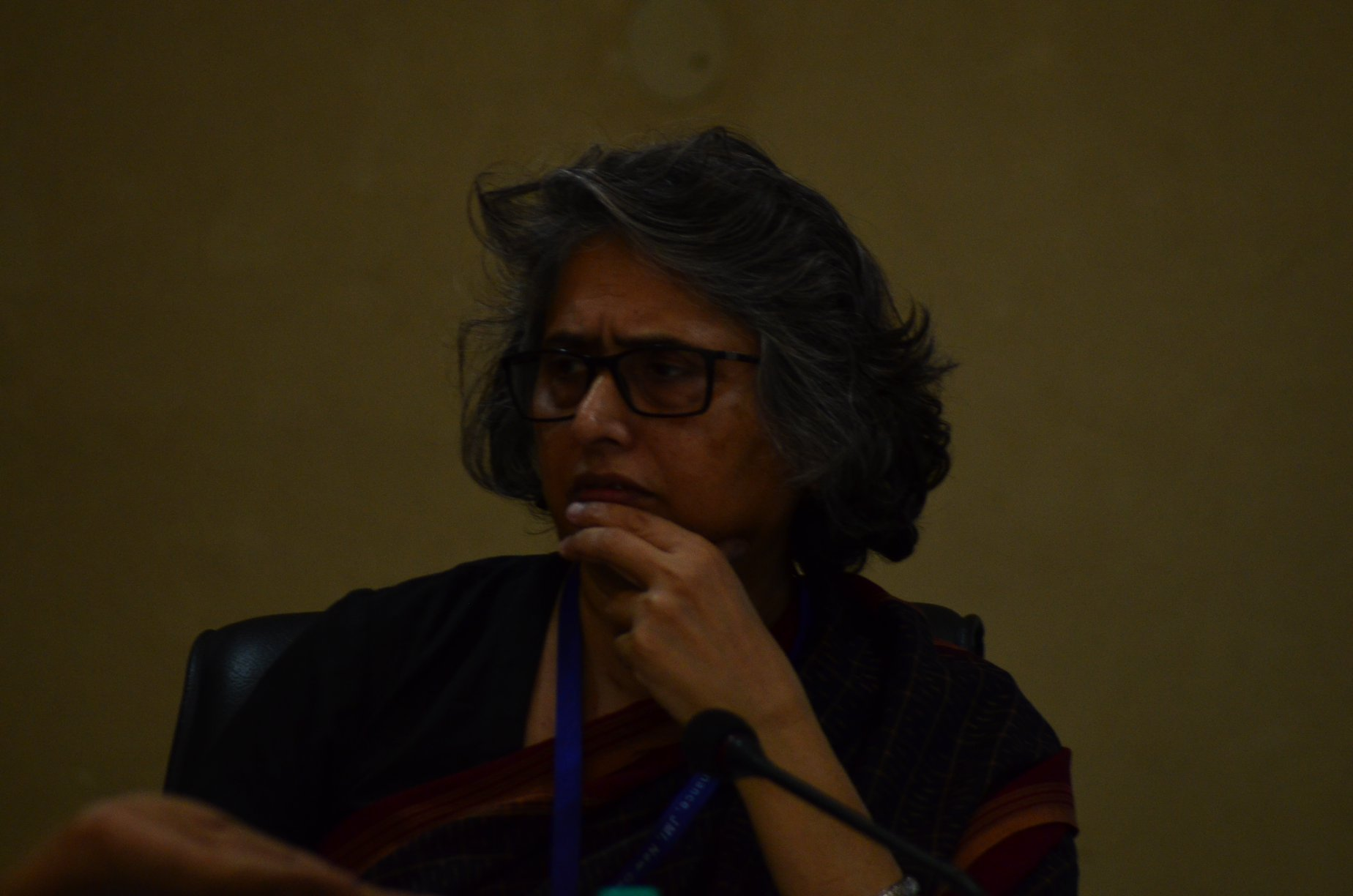
- Occupation(s): Art Historian and Critic
- Notable work: 'Islamic Art: The Past and the Modern’ and 'Awraq-e Musavvir, Mughal Art of Portraiture'

Nuzhat Kazmi (born 26 October 1957) is an art historian and critic. She was a faculty and the founding head of the Department of Art History and Appreciation at Faculty of Fine Arts, Jamia Millia Islamia in New Delhi.

She is a researcher and author, her specialities include Islamic art, Mughal art, and Medieval and European influences on late medieval and early modern Indian art. She has authored ‘Islamic Art: The Past and the Modern’, 'Awraq-e Musavvir, Mughal Art of Portraiture' and others.

== Career ==
She started her career by teaching art history in Jamia Millia Islamia. Later she founded a department 'Art History and Appreciation' there.

== Work and reception ==
She has been a scholar and faculty for more than 4 decades. The disciplines of art history and criticism frequently reference her writings. Her specialities include notably Islamic art, Mughal art, post-European mediaeval and modern Indian art. Kazmi attends the University of London's School of Oriental and African Studies as a Commonwealth Scholar.

She has delivered lecture at institution of national and international importance like Indira Gandhi National Centre for the Arts, Delhi, and National Gallery of Modern Arts, Nehru Centre, London University.

=== Islamic Art ===
In 2009, she authored a book Islamic Art: The Past and the Modern. The book discusses how Islamic art evolved in tandem with all other artistic genres. From its earliest forms, it has taken from different cultural traditions, and it still does. The book looks at the artistic works that the Islamic culture has generated over the ages, from its origins to contemporary interpretations. Kazmi has blended the inclusive and exclusive characteristics of this great tradition from all over the world with the sensitivity and seriousness that this particular sort of art demands.

=== Mughal Art ===
Her work "Awraq-e Musavvir, Mughal Art of Portraiture" is notable in Mughal art history. The entire body of Mughal Portrait paintings is examined in this book. It explores the topic from a historical, social, political, and cultural perspective. It talks about how Mughal emperors were not just art enthusiasts but also experts. Furthermore, Kazmi has investigated the gender and sovereignty themes in the context of portraiture.

== See also ==
- Art history
- Islamic art
