= Hindutva Watch =

Independent research organization

- Established: April 2021, 01; 5 years ago
- Type: Independent research initiative
- Purpose: Monitoring and documenting hate crimes and human rights abuses in India
- Headquarters: Cambridge, USA
- Region served: India
- Founder: Raqib Hameed Naik
- Website: www.hindutvawatch.org

Hindutva Watch is an independent research project that documents alleged hate crimes and hate speech against religious minorities in India. The term Hindutva in its title refers to those who advocate for Hindu supremacy.

== Operation ==
Hindutva Watch was founded in April 2021 by Raqib Hameed Naik in response to growing concern over the rise of hate crimes and violence targeting Indian religious minorities. The organization employs a real-time data collection methodology to track and catalog instances of violent attacks, hate speech, and human rights violations against communities based on their faith, including Muslims, Christians, and members of lower-ranked castes. The team is primarily composed of volunteers situated across the United States, Canada, and Europe.

Since its inception, Hindutva Watch has documented and cataloged over 1,000 instances of violent attacks, hate speech, and other forms of human rights abuses against minority and marginalized communities in India. Their data is verified before being posted. Hindutva Watch reports have been referenced in public discourse, including a Supreme Court of India petition in August 2023 that cited nine Hindutva Watch reports to highlight cases of alleged police inaction during communal violence.

== Reception ==
Hindutva Watch has been "a thorn in the side of Hindu nationalists who have been provoking anti-Muslim sentiment for years." It has provoked strong criticism from OpIndia and other Hindutva mouthpieces. Its X account was blocked in India in early 2024 at the "Modi government's request", a move challenged by its founder.

== See also ==
- Human rights in India
- Religious violence in India
