= V. Sasikumar =

Indian politician and union leader (born 1961)

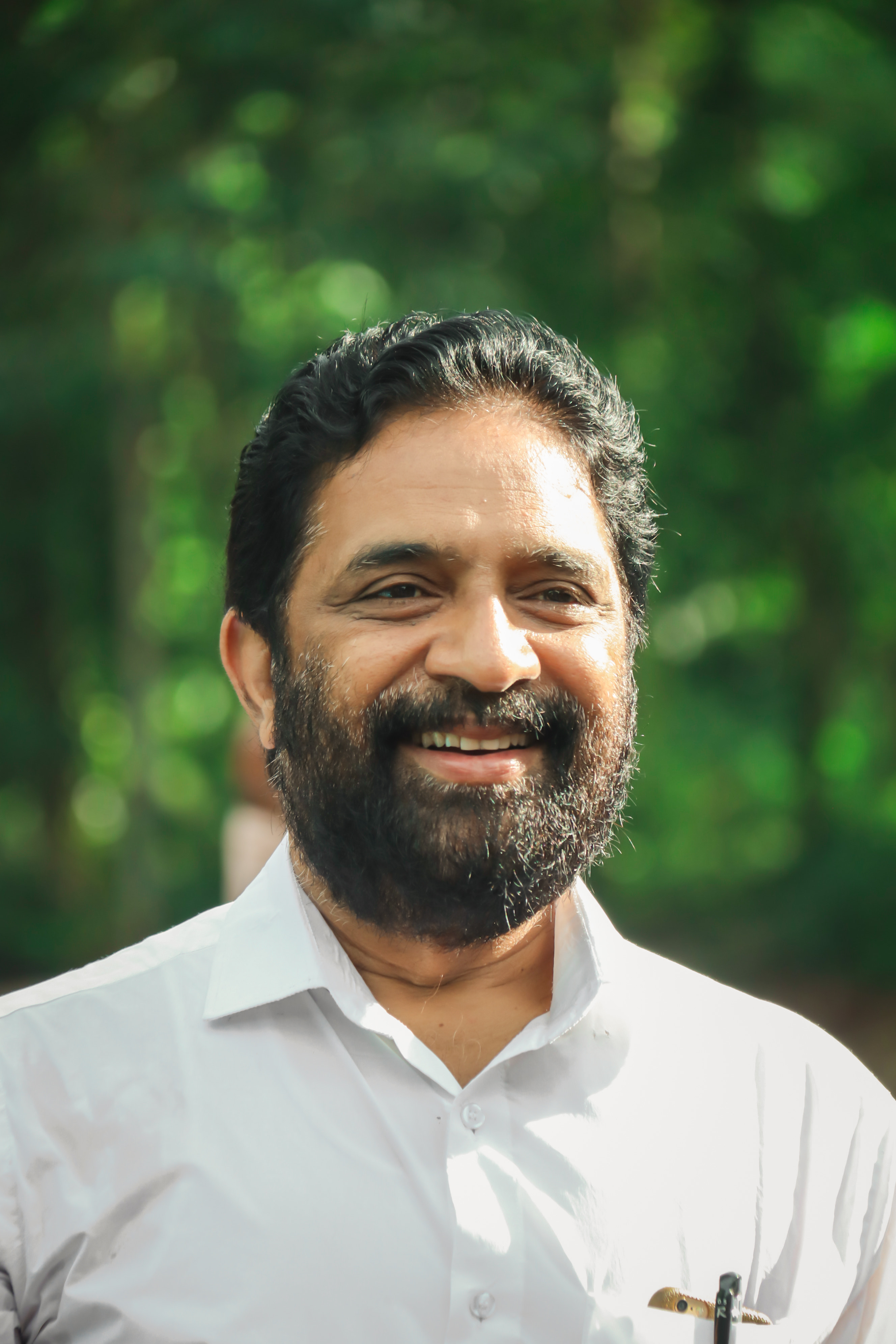

Member of Kerala Legislative Assembly
- In office 2006–2011
- Preceded by: Nalakath Soopy
- Succeeded by: Manjalamkuzhi Ali
- Constituency: Perinthalmanna

Personal details
- Born: 17 June 1961 (age 65)
- Party: Communist Party of Indian (Marxist)
- Education: Government College, Malappuram

V. Sasikumar (born 17 June 1961) is the former MLA of Perinthalmanna assembly constituency and the National Secretary of Construction Workers Federation of India. He is currently the chairman of Kerala Building & Other Construction Workers Welfare Board, Govt of Kerala.

Sasikumar is the Director of EMS Memorial Co-Operative Hospital & Research Centre, Malappuram and the Managing Trustee of EMS Memorial Charitable Trust. He is also the Chairman of Cherukad Smaraka Trust and Library, Malappuram.

He is the secretariat member of UITBB (Union internationale des syndicats des travailleurs du bâtiment, du bois et des matériaux de construction), an international trade union platform.

== Life ==
V. Sasikumar was born on 17 June 1961 to Sankaran and Narayani at Perinthalmanna. His spouse is Badarunnisa K. She was the former Chairperson of Malappuram Municipal Corporation and the State Secretary of Kerala School Teachers Association. His daughter Nisa Valiyaparambil is working as a doctor.

V Sasikumar completed his secondary schooling from Government High School, Perinthalmanna and secured his pre degree from PTM Govt College, Perinthalmanna. He is a graduate in Economics from Govt College Malappuram, University of Calicut in 1982. He has also completed a higher diploma in Co-operation from Palakkad Co- Operative Training College.

== Political career ==
=== Student activism ===
V. Sasikumar entered politics through Students' Federation of India. His early involvement in student politics made him the school speaker at Perinthalmanna Model Higher Secondary School during 1974–75. From 1970–85, the student activist in Sasikumar was dynamic and during this period he was elected to various offices representing students.

- The Union Councillor representing PTM Government College, Perinthalmanna at University of Calicut (1976–77).
- The Chairman of Government College, Malappuram (1979–80).
- The University Union Councillor representing Government College, Malappuram at University of Calicut (1980–81).

From 1976–79, he was elected as the Joint Secretary of the Malappuram District Committee of SFI. He later became the President of SFI Malappuram District Committee (1980–82) and the state committee member of SFI.

=== Youth activism ===
V. Sasikumar was involved with the activities of Democratic Youth Federation of India (DYFI) and has assumed various positions:

- The Secretary of Perinthalmanna Block Committee, DYFI (1982–83).
- The Vice President of Malappuram District Committee, DYFI (1987–90).
- The Secretary of Malappuram District Committee, DYFI (1992-1994).
- The Joint Secretary of Kerala State Committee, DYFI (1994–97).
- The Member of Central Committee of DYFI.

=== Trade union activism ===
Apart from his involvement in SFI and DYFI, Sasikumar was active in trade union movement from 1978.

He is currently the National Secretary of Construction Workers Federation of India affiliated to Centre of Indian Trade Unions (CITU).

=== Party politics ===
Sasikumar is a prominent face of Communist Party of India (Marxist) in Malappuram.

- Area secretary of CPIM at Perinthalmanna (1997-2000).
- District Committee Member of CPI(M) at Malappuram from 1997.
- District Secretariat Member of CPI(M) at Malappuram from 2001.

=== Electoral politics ===
V. Sasikumar contested from Perinthalmanna (State Assembly Constituency) in 2001, 2006, 2011 and 2016. He marked his victory in 2006 Kerala Assembly Election by defeating Hameed Master of Indian Union Muslim League (IUML). He is the only communist leader to win Perinthalmanna (State Assembly Constituency) after P. M. Kutty in 1967. From 1970 to 2006, IUML enjoyed unabated victory in the constituency, only to be disturbed by V. Sasikumar. In 2011 Assembly elections, IUML introduced former CPI(M) MLA Manjalamkuzhi to meet the challenge of Sasikumar and it was a successful endeavour. However, the contest between these rivals became more intense with 2016 assembly election, where the margin of defeat was brought down to 579 votes.

From 2006–2010, he was the house committee Member of Kerala Legislative Assembly as well.

No.	Year	Constituency	Winner	Votes	Political Party	Runner-up	Votes	Political Party	Margin
1	2006	Perinthalmanna (State Assembly constituency)	V. Sasikumar	76059	CPI(M)	Hameed Master	62056	Indian Union Muslim League	14003
2	2011	Perinthalmanna (State Assembly constituency)	Manjalamkuzhi Ali	69,730	Indian Union Muslim League	V. Sasikumar	60,141	CPI(M)	9,589
3	2016	Perinthalmanna (State Assembly constituency)	Manjalamkuzhi Ali	70,990	Indian Union Muslim League	V. Sasikumar	70,411	CPI(M)	579
