= Syed Hassan (educationist) =

Indian educationalist

Dr. Syed Hasan
- Born: 30 September 1924; Jehanabad, Bihar, India
- Died: 25 January 2016 (aged 91)
- Resting place: Kishanganj, Bihar, India
- Occupations: Educationist; Humanist
- Years active: Since 1965
- Known for: INSAN School
- Children: Saba Syed Hafeez, Gesoo Syed Hafeez, Raza Syed Hafeez, Shefa Syed Hafeez
- Awards: Padma Shri; Nehru Literacy Award
- Website: http://www.insanmission.net

Syed Hasan (1924–2016), popularly known as Syed Bhai [translates to Brother Syed in English], was an Indian educationist, humanist and the founder of INSAN Group of Institutions, mostly known for one of its founding organization, INSAN School. He is known for his pioneering efforts to bring education to Kishanganj, formerly an educationally backward district in the Indian state of Bihar. He was a nominee for the Nobel Peace Prize in 2003. The Government of India awarded him the fourth highest civilian award of the Padma Shri, in 1991.

== Biography ==
Syed Hasan was born on 30 September 1924 in a small town Jehanabad, Bihar, India. When he was 10 years old his parents enrolled him in Delhi at Jamia Millia Islamia (JMI). During his early education at Jamia Millia Islamia (JMI), Hasan had the opportunity to assist Mahatma Gandhi and also came under the tutelage of Zakir Husain, who would later become the first President of India. He graduated from JMI and started his career as a teacher there where he stayed till he moved to the US, on a fellowship from Lincoln University, Pennsylvania in 1955. He moved, subsequently, to Southern Illinois University, Carbondale and stayed there till 1962 during which time, he obtained a doctoral degree (PhD). He also became a member of the educational societies of the Phi Delta Kappa and Kappa Delta Pi and is reported to have financially assisted some of the students from JMI to pursue education in the US. In 1962, he took up the post of the assistant professor of psychology at Frostburg State University, Maryland, and during the three years he spent there, he was awarded the Instructor of the Year once.

Hasan returned to India in 1965. In India, he had offers from many universities, but he started to lay the groundwork for his own educational work. After nearly one year of ground work he founded, Taleemi Mission Corp (Educational Mission Corp) in February 1966, and Taleemi Biradri (Educational Brotherhood), an educational journal in March 1966., And nearly after two years of ground work he started an elementary level INSAN School, on 14 November 1966, with 36 students, which became the flagship institution of its kind. Initially the school operated inside the premises of the National School before or after its school hours. Later, he moved the school to a rented hut. The institution grew over the years to include INSAN School, INSAN College and INSAN Adult School, operating still mostly from huts, now instead of bamboo in brick and tin style. His active role in the field of education has not been limited to Insan School. He has helped many schools and educational causes. The list of services and contributions with which he has been involved in include many provincial and national educational projects; such as Educational Panel of the Bureau for Promotion of Urdu, New Delhi; Children's Literacy Panel of the Bureau for Promotion of Urdu, New Delhi; Bihar State Adult Education Board; Bihar Urdu Academy; Jamia Faculty Selection Committee. He has been a life member of the Indian Adult Education Board. He has also served in Central Advisory Board of Education (CABE), Grants & Aids Commission for Experiments in Education, District Primary Education Program (DPEP), and Decentralization of Education Management.

== Philosophy of Work ==
"Our institution is community centered. We believe in total development. We feel that education should lead to self-development. This development should take place by means of self-help and self-reliance. In a way, education means independence. It should make us free from others. We should become capable of running our own affairs without the help of others as far as it is possible. Hence, we the educators are here to facilitate and to assist this process of development".

== Awards and honors ==
Overs the years Hasan has been honoured with many lifetime awards including National Integration Award, Shiksha Bharti Pruskar, Indira Gandhi Sadbhawna Award, and Nehru Literacy Award. The Government of India included him in the 1991 Republic Day honours list for the civilian honour of the Padma Shri. In 2003, he was shortlisted for the Nobel Peace Prize, the honour eventually going to Shirin Ebadi, the Iranian human rights activist.

== See also ==
- Jamia Millia Islamia
