= Mohammad Zahid Ashraf =

Indian scholar and academician

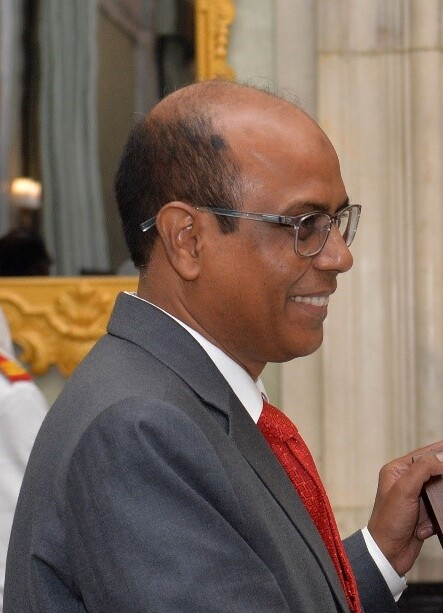
- Zahid Ashraf in 2022
- Born: 1973 (age 52–53); Jalkaura, Khagaria, Bihar, India
- Education: Jamia Millia Islamia; University of Delhi; Lerner Research Institute
- Known for: Studies on venous thrombosis at high altitudes
- Children: Zaid Ashraf, Zunaira Ashraf
- Awards: 2021, Jamia Award of Research Excellence 2021, Visitor’s Award: 2017–18 N-BIOS Prize; 2018, Basanti Devi Amirchand Award, Indian Council of Medical Research 2014, Surg. Rear Admiral M. S. Malhotra Awards, DRDO 2008, Innovations Award, Cleveland Clinic Foundation, Cleveland, OH, USA
- Scientific career
- Fields: Cardiovascular Biology; Functional genomics
- Workplaces: Defence Institute of Physiology and Allied Sciences; Jamia Millia Islamia

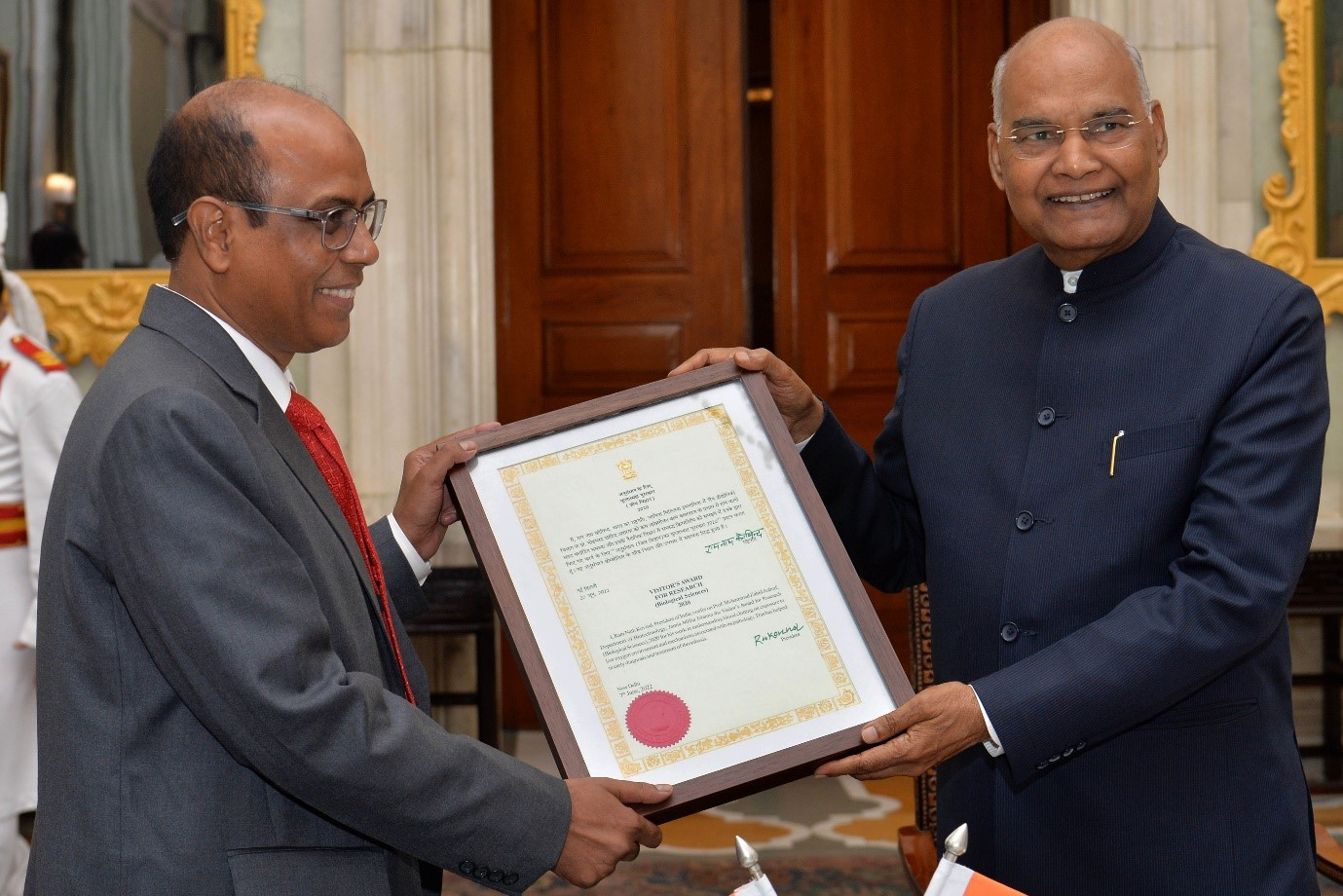
Prof. Zahid Ashraf with former president of India, Shri Ram Nath Kovind during the Visitors (President) award ceremony 2022

Mohammad Zahid Ashraf (born 1973) is an Indian scientist and an academician. Known for his studies on thrombosis experienced at high altitudes. Ashraf is an elected fellow of the National Academy of Sciences, India, Indian National Sciences Academy and Indian Academy of Sciences, and an elected member of the National Academy of Medical Sciences. The Department of Biotechnology of the Government of India awarded him the National Bioscience Award for Career Development, one of the highest Indian science awards, for his contributions to biosciences in 2017–18. Ashraf currently serves as a professor and Dean of the Faculty of Life Sciences at Jamia Millia Islamia.

== Biography ==
Mohammad Zahid Ashraf, born in 1973, graduated in biosciences from Jamia Millia Islamia in 1994 and continued there to secure a master's degree in 1996. Subsequently, he did his doctoral research at Vallabhbhai Patel Chest Institute which earned him a PhD from the University of Delhi in 2001. His post-doctoral training was at the Lerner Research Institute of Cleveland Clinic and on his return to India, he joined the Defence Institute of Physiology and Allied Sciences (DIPAS) in 2009 as a scientist at grade D at its Genomics division which he headed from 2014 till 2017. He moved to his alma mater, Jamia Millia Islamia that year where he holds the position of a professor and the Dean of the newly created, Faculty of Life Sciences.

Ashraf leads a team of researchers who are involved in studies in the fields of Cardiovascular biology, Functional genomics, Molecular medicine and Translational biology. He worked among the Indian army soldiers stationed in Siachen Glacier to study the effect of high altitude on venous thrombosis and his studies were published in the Proceedings of the National Academy of Sciences of the United States of America. It was during these studies, he discovered the role played by novel regulator “Calpain” in pathogenesis of thrombosis. He has published a number of articles; (Note: Please see Selected bibliography section) ResearchGate, an online repository of scientific articles has listed 34 of them.

Ashraf resides in Delhi, along the Mall Road.

== Awards and honors ==
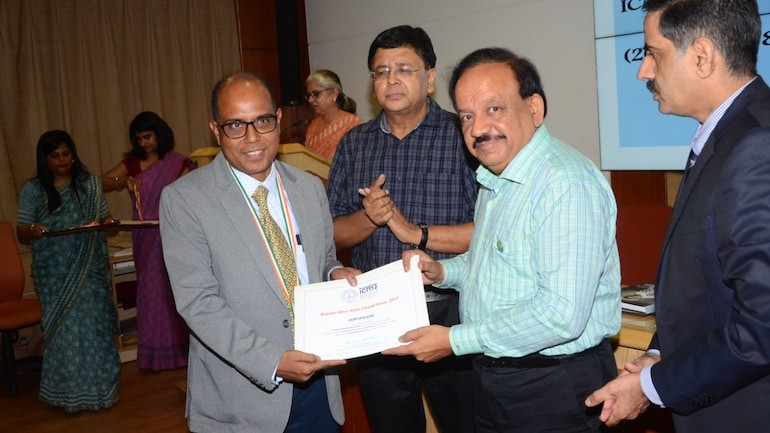
Prof. Zahid Ashraf with former Minister of Science & Technology of India, Dr Harsh Vardhan and former DG-ICMR, Dr Balram Bhargava during ICMR Basanti Devi Amir Chand award ceremony 2019

Ashraf was elected as a member of the National Academy of Medical Sciences in 2015. and the National Academy of Sciences, India and the Indian Academy of Sciences elected him as a fellow in 2018. The Department of Biotechnology of the Government of India awarded him the National Bioscience Award for Career Development, one of the highest Indian science awards, for his contributions to biosciences, in 2017–18. He has also been awarded with Indian Council of Medical Research (ICMR) Basanti Devi Amir Chand Prize 2019 by Honorable Health Minister, Govt. of India, Dr. Harsh Vardhan and Jamia Award of Research Excellence 2021 by Vice Chancellor Jamia Millia Islamia as recognition of his research excellence. Recently, he received the prestigious Visitor’s Award from President Ram Nath Kovind on Tuesday at the Rashtrapati Bhavan in June 2022 for his pioneering research on resolving the mystery of blood clotting on exposure to hypoxia at high altitudes. He is also an invited member of the Pulmonary Vascular Research Institute and a recipient of Innovations Award (2008) of the Cleveland Clinic Foundation, P.A. Kurup Oration Award (2014) of the Indian Society for Atherosclerosis Research and the Rear Admiral M. S. Malhotra Award (2014) of the Defence Research and Development Organization.

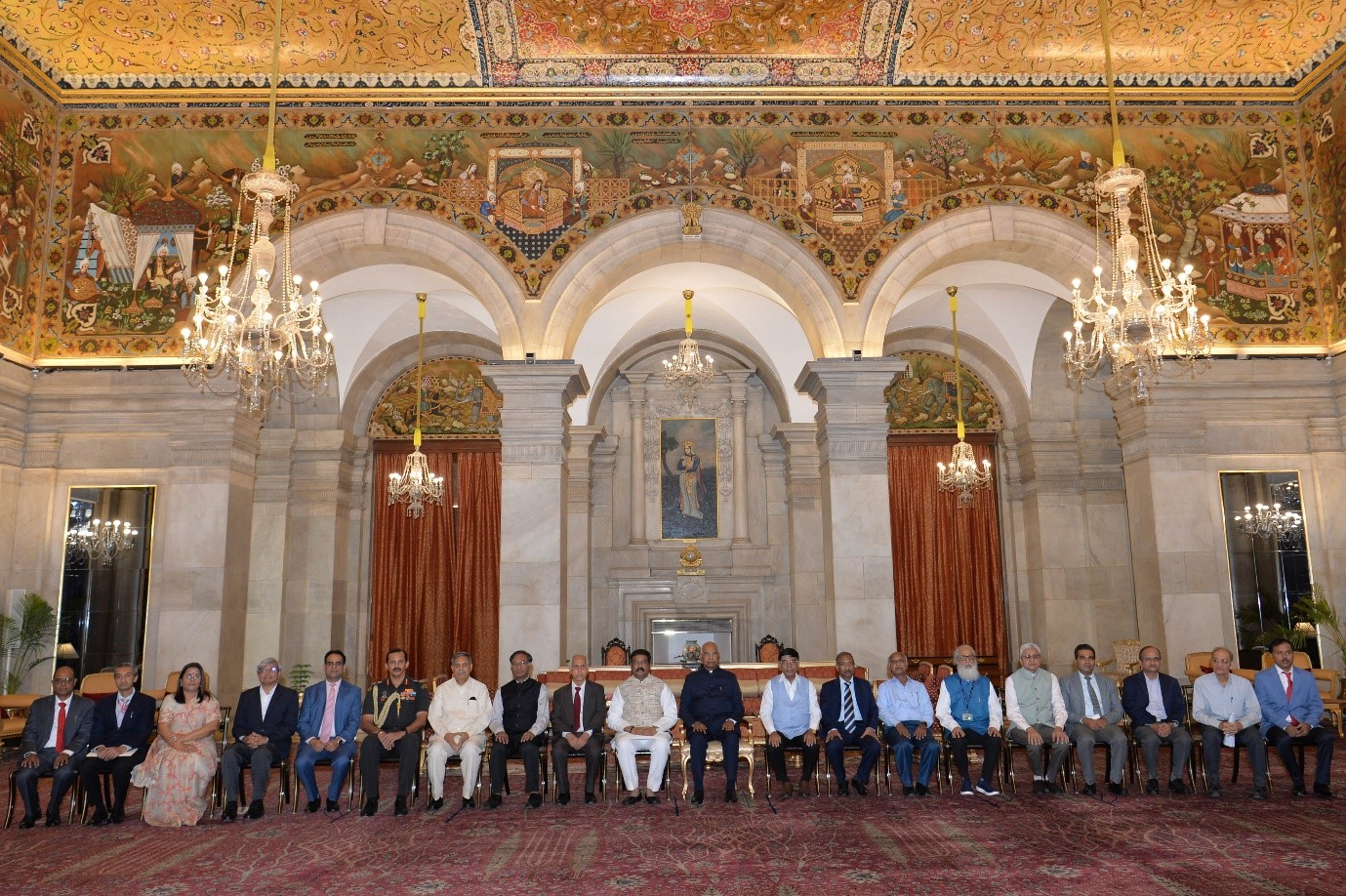
Visitors (President) award ceremony 2022 in Rashtrapati Bhawan

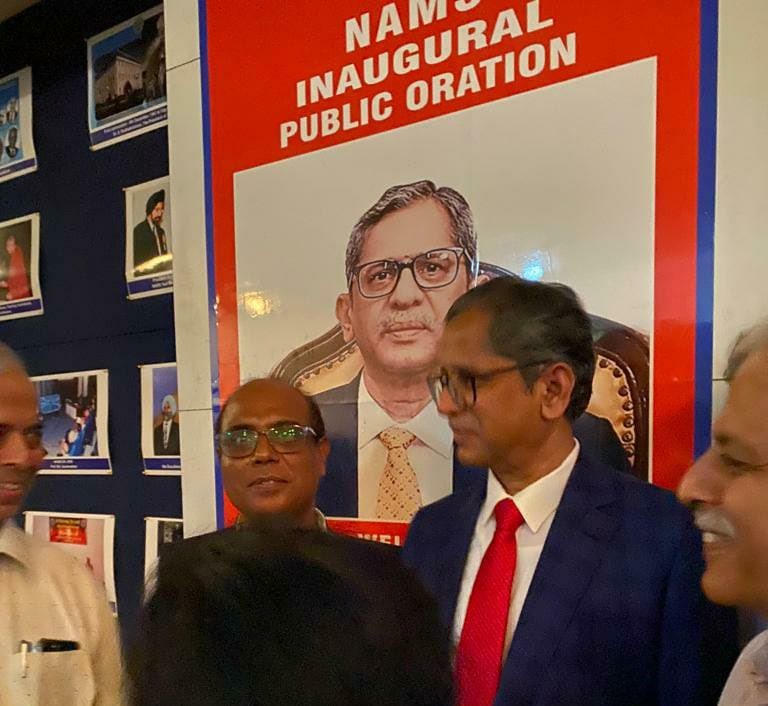
Prof Zahid Ashraf with Ex-CJI of India, N V Ramana during the release of ‘Report of Taskforce on venous thrombosis & embolism in India’

== Selected bibliography ==
- Ashraf, Mohammad Z. (10 December 2015). "Hypertension at high altitude: the interplay between genetic and biochemical factors in the setting of oxidative stress". Hypertension Research. 39 (4): 199–200. doi:10.1038/hr.2015.140. PMID 26657006. S2CID 2741656.
- Ashraf, Mohammad Z.; Singh, Shashi Bala; Ganju, Lilly; Sengupta, Shantanu; Bajaj, Nitin; Chatterjee, Tathagat; Nair, Velu; Ahmad, Yasmin; Sahu, Anita (20 February 2014). "Altered expression of platelet proteins and calpain activity mediate hypoxia-induced prothrombotic phenotype". Blood. 123 (8): 1250–1260. doi:10.1182/blood-2013-05-501924. ISSN 1528-0020. PMID 24297866.
- Podrez, Eugene A.; Sayre, Lawrence M.; Lin, De; Kar, Niladri S.; Ashraf, Mohammad Z.; Gao, Detao (12 February 2010). "Structural Basis for the Recognition of Oxidized Phospholipids in Oxidized Low Density Lipoproteins by Class B Scavenger Receptors CD36 and SR-BI". Journal of Biological Chemistry. 285 (7): 4447–4454. doi:10.1074/jbc.M109.082800. ISSN 1083-351X. PMC 2836050. PMID 19996318.
- Podrez, Eugene A.; Valiyaveettil, Manojkumar; Ashraf, Mohammad Z.; Kar, Niladri S. (28 March 2008). "Mapping and Characterization of the Binding Site for Specific Oxidized Phospholipids and Oxidized Low Density Lipoprotein of Scavenger Receptor CD36". Journal of Biological Chemistry. 283 (13): 8765–8771. doi:10.1074/jbc.M709195200. ISSN 1083-351X. PMC 2417175. PMID 18245080.
- Podrez, Eugene A.; Febbraio, Maria; Byzova, Tatiana V.; Ashraf, Mohammad Z.; Kar, Niladri; Valiyaveettil, Manojkumar (15 February 2008). "Oxidized high-density lipoprotein inhibits platelet activation and aggregation via scavenger receptor BI". Blood. 111 (4): 1962–1971. doi:10.1182/blood-2007-08-107813. ISSN 1528-0020. PMC 2234045. PMID 17993610.
