= Satpal Tanwar =

Activist

National President of Bhim Sena and Sanvidhan Suraksha Party -SSP
- Incumbent
- Assumed office 1 October 2010 Bhim Sena and 26 November 2025 SSP
- Preceded by: Position established

Personal details
- Born: 29 October 1999 (age 26) Gurgaon, Haryana, India
- Spouse: Nisha Tanwar Advocate
- Occupation: Politician and social activist

Satpal Tanwar (born 29 October 1999) is a national and international politician and Indian social activist, and the founder and national president of Bhim Sena and the Sanvidhan Suraksha Party.

== Career ==
Tanwar is the founder and national president of Bhim Sena (All India Ambedkar Army) and Sanvidhan Suraksha Party -SSP. Bhim Sena was founded by Tanwar on 1 October 2010 (Bhim Sena Diwas) and Sanvidhan Suraksha Party -SSP was founded by Tanwar on 26 November 2025 on Constitution Day. He was the key person in organising the 2017 protests at Jantar Mantar regarding inaction in the Saharanpur violence case. He was support to Bhim Army in 2017.

He took part in the April 2018 caste protests and organised members of Bhim Sena at Kamla Nehru Park in Delhi.

Tanwar protested at the national level against the decision of classification in reservation given by the Supreme Court on 1 August 2024. To protest the decision of division in reservation of Scheduled Castes / Tribes, he announced a nationwide Bharat Bandh on 21 August 2024. After this call of Tanwar, many Dalit social organizations and political parties supported the Bharat Bandh of Bhim Sena. After this, more than 28 lakh workers of Bhim Sena along with other Dalit social organizations successfully organized Bharat Bandh.

== Personal life ==
Tanwar filed a case under the SC/ST Act against Haryanvi dancer Sapna Chaudhary for allegedly degrading the Dalit community in one of the folk ragni songs. She attempted suicide after the case in 2016, blaming Tanwar for running online propaganda against her. Later on the case against her was cancelled and he was booked for abetment.

He was then attacked by a group of unknown men (alleged supporters of Sapna) late at night. Later an Indian Army soldier was caught threatening him over the phone for drawing back the case.

Tanwar landed in controversy again in 2022 for his misogynistic and derogatory remarks against Nupur Sharma, for her alleged blasphemous comments made during a television debate. He went on to offer 1 crore rupees to whoever severs her tongue and bring it to him. He claimed that she deserves to be hanged, which eventually got his Twitter account suspended. He was arrested, but later released on bail.

== See also ==
- Ambedkarism
