= Nuzhat Parveen Khan =

Indian academic (born 1964)

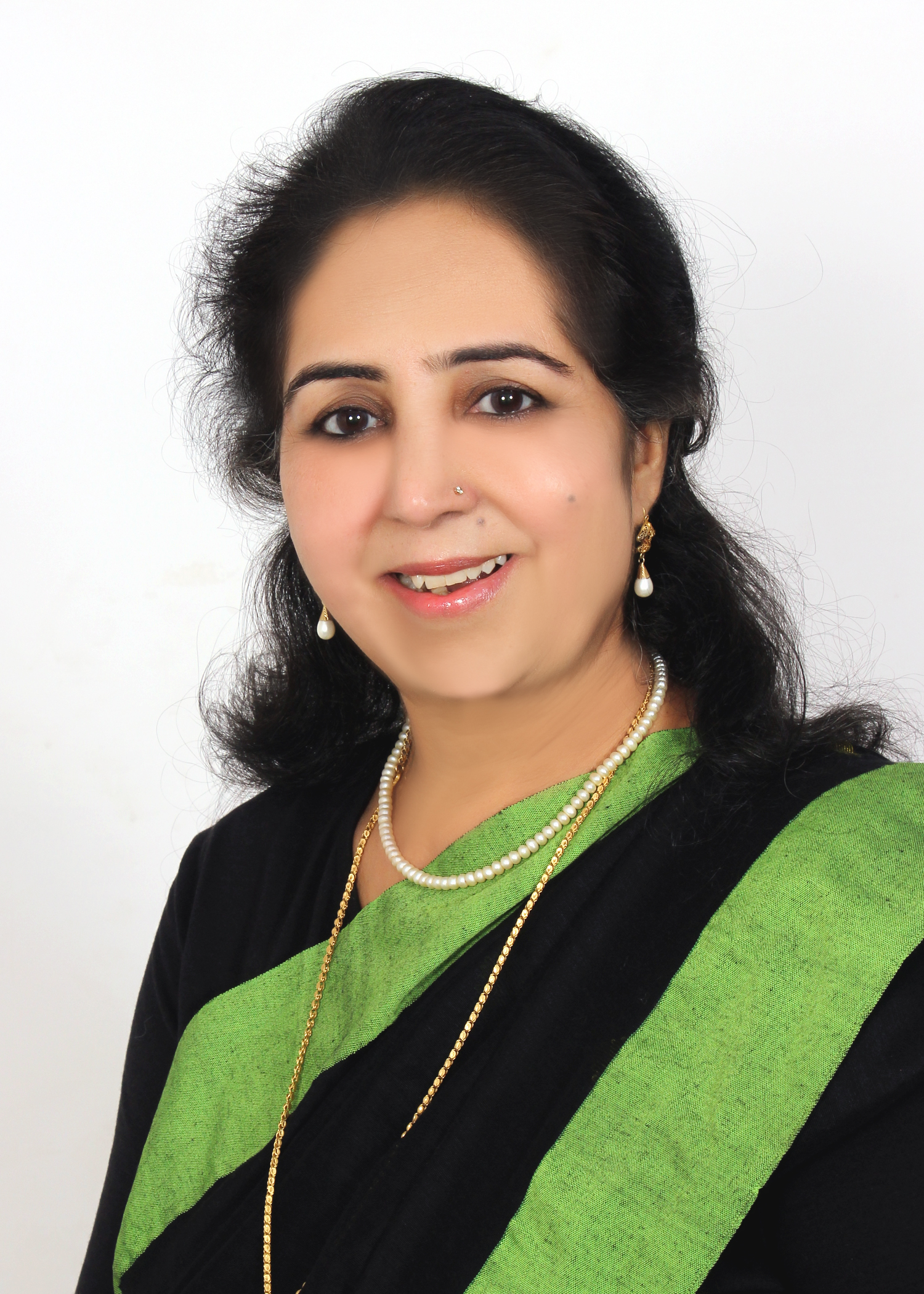
- Born: 4 July 1964 (age 62); Pilibhit, Uttar Pradesh
- Education: University of Lucknow; Aligarh Muslim University; Jamia Millia Islamia
- Occupations: Academician, author
- Years active: 1992-present

Nuzhat Parveen Khan (born 4 July 1964) is an Indian academic and author who served as the dean of Bennett University's School of Law. She has formerly served as the dean of Jamia Millia Islamia's Faculty of Law and is now a professor at the university. She has authored dozens of books including Women and Child related Laws, Comparative Constitutional Law and Globalisation of Professional Legal Education Constitutional Conspectus.

== Education ==
Khan graduated from the Lucknow University with a BSc in Chemistry. She received an LL.B and an LL.M degree from the Aligarh Muslim University. She completed her doctoral studies at the Jamia Millia Islamia.

== Personal life ==
She was born in Pilibhit city and her father's name was Mohammad Suleman. She has two children.

== Career ==
Khan practiced as an advocate in 1989 before moving to academics. She joined the Faculty of Law of the Jamia Millia Islamia (JMI) in 1992 as assistant professor. She was promoted to associate professor in 2008 and then a professor in 2013. She served as the dean of the JMI's Faculty of Law from 2016 to 2019. During her deanship, the faculty secured first rank among the law schools in India, in a ranking done by India Today in 2017 .

She has featured in Higher Education Digest December 2021, where she talks about School of Law, Bennett University mentioned as one of the Top Law Colleges in the country. She was included in the list of India's 20 Pragmatic Women Leaders in Higher Education 2022 on the website the Academic Insights. She was included in the list of 100 Inspiring Muslim Women from Uttar Pradesh, India under the theme "Rising Beyond the Ceiling" published by Inspiring Indian Muslim Women for her contribution in the field of academics. She was awarded Best Academician of the Year 2021 by the Centre for Education Growth and Research 8th Higher Education Summit Cum 16th Rashtriya Shiksha Gauray Puraskar Ceremony 2021 on 30 December 2021

As of 2021, Parveen is the dean of Bennett University's School of Law. She has worked on a project for the Ministry of Women and Child Development, titled, A Study of Discriminative and Derogatory Practices against Women by Khap Panchayats, Kangaroo Courts and Shalishi Adalats in India: An Empirical Study in the States of Haryana, Rajasthan, Western U.P. and West Bengal. The project report was presented to the Parliament of India in 2014.

== Publications ==
Khan has authored books including Globalisation of Professional Legal Education Constitutional Conspectus (Bloomsbury India, 28 October 2021), Women and Child related Laws (LEXIS NEXIS Publication, January 2020), Comparative Constitutional Law (SATYAM LAW INTERNATIONAL Publication, 1 January 2018), Forensic Science and Indian Legal System (Central Law Publications, 2022), Child Rights and the Law (Universal Law Publishing - An Imprint of LexisNexis; Second edition (1 April 2016), Law and Justice in Globalized World, Legal Control of Air Pollution: Problems And Perspectives (Metropolitan Book Co.Pvt, 1 January 2008), Law relating to Socio-Economic Offences (Central Law Publication,1 January 2018) and Disability Laws in India ( Satyam Law International, 1 January 2018).

== Articles ==
- Article published in Indian Express newspaper titled as Role of Artificial Intelligence In Transforming Judicial Landscape of India dated 19 June 2022
- Article published in Times of India newspaper titled as Parenting While Pursuing Higher Education dated 31 January 2022
- Article published in Times of India newspaper titled as Why E-Courts and Virtual Hearings are Here to Stay dated 4 October 2021
