= Raziuddin Aquil =

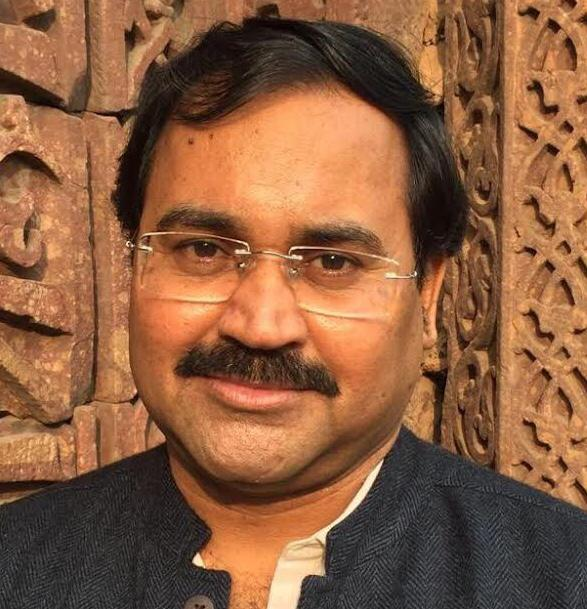
- Raziuddin Aquil, November 2021 at Qutub Complex, New Delhi.
- Born: 2 January 1969 (age 57); Kako, Bihar
- Occupation: Professor

Academic background
- Education: PhD from JNU
- Alma mater: Jamia Millia Islamia, Jawaharlal Nehru University

Academic work
- Discipline: Historian
- Sub-discipline: Medieval History, Vernacular History, Islam in India, Sufism
- Institutions: Delhi University

Raziuddin Aquil (born 2 January 1969) is an Indian historian, author and academic serving as a professor in the Department of History, University of Delhi. His research interests include religious practices, literary cultures and historical traditions in medieval and early modern India.

His special contribution is in Indian Islamic history and Sufism. He authored several books around these debates.

== Early life and education ==
He was born in a small town Kako in the Jahanabad district of Bihar.

He completed his Master of Arts in history in 1993 from the Department of History and Culture, Jamia Millia Islamia, New Delhi, and his M.Phil. and Ph.D. from Jawaharlal Nehru University, New Delhi.

He was a fellow in history at the Centre for Studies in Social Sciences, Calcutta. And later he returned to Delhi and joined Delhi University as a faculty.

== Work and reception ==
He has worked across the different thematic in the sociological history of Islam in India, Sufism, vernacular history. His publications on religious customs, literary traditions, and historical practices in medieval and early modern India are extensive.

=== Islam and Muslim history ===
His latest book explored Islam and its intertwined history with India. By examining Islam's development in South Asia from the 13th century to the present, The Muslim Question: Understanding Islam and Indian History aims to transcend the dichotomy of liberal and extremist Islam. This book has critically asked questions on violence, extremism and fundamentalism in Islam. Also, this book discusses the constructive roles of Sufi saints in the dissemination of Islamic messages in the Indian subcontinent.

=== Sufism ===
In 2007 Aquil authored Sufism, Culture, and Politics: Afghans and Islam in Medieval North India. In this book he examined the political history of north India in the late fifteenth and early sixteenth centuries. The book includes topics including Sher Shah Suri's empire-building, the Rajputs' involvement, governance standards, and the influence of Sufis on politics and culture.

In 2010, Aquil's works on Sufism and Society came out as a publication Sufism and Society in Medieval India. These selected studies on the long-running debates about the many roles Sufis had in medieval Indian society and culture are collected in this anthology. It centers on important topics including the exchanges or encounters of Sufis in the Indian context, the process of Islamicization, the growth of Islam in India, and episodic conversion.

Published in 2017, Aquil's book Lovers of God: Sufism and the Politics of Islam in Medieval India examines the connection between Sufism and the socio-political environment of medieval India. The book centers on the important role played by Sufis, who identified as God's friends and lovers.

Days in the Life of a Sufi by Aquil is a collection of 101 stories that delve into the lives of Sufi saints. The book provides insights into mystical exercises, charitable endeavors, and the enduring relevance of Sufis in shaping a pluralistic, diverse, and tolerant Indian society.

=== Vernacular history ===
History in the Vernacular, edited by Raziuddin Aquil and Partha Chatterjee, explores regional and vernacular histories in India. The book challenges the assumption that India had no history writing before British colonial intervention. By examining vernacular contexts and traditions of historical production, the essays reveal distinctly indigenous historical narratives embedded within non-historical literary genres. These narratives are found in languages such as Assamese, Bengali, Tamil, and others.

=== Medieval and early modern history ===
Literary and Religious Practices in Medieval and Early Modern India was edited by Raziuddin Aquil and David L. Curley. The history of medieval and early modern India, from the eighth to the eighteenth centuries, is covered in the book. The book examines issues of this era's literary traditions, religious rituals, and the interaction between politics and religion.

Warfare, Religion, and Society in Indian History is a collection of essays edited by Aquil and Kaushik Roy that explores the intricate connections between religion and warfare in Indian history. The book challenges conventional narratives and encourages readers to engage with these complex historical intersections. The book also provides valuable insights into the relationship between religion, war, and society in India.

An Earthly Paradise: Trade, Politics, and Culture in Early Modern Bengal edited by Aquil and Tilottama Mukherjee delves into Bengal's sixteenth to eighteenth-century trading networks, religious customs, artistic patronage, and politico-cultural practices. It offers insightful information about this intriguing period in Indian history.

==== Columns ====
He has been writing for publications like Economic & Political Weekly, The Frontline, The Wire, The Sunday Guardian, The Telegraph India, and National Herald among many others.

==== Member and associations ====
Aquil is on the editorial boards of the journals History and Sociology of South Asia (Sage) and South Asia Research (Sage).

==== Conference and lectures ====
In academic settings both domestically and internationally, Aquil has delivered extension lectures and papers at conferences at universities such as Jawaharlal Nehru University, Princeton University, University of Lausanne, Ambedkar University Delhi, and University of Kashmir.

==== Journal articles ====
Aquil has authored multiple publications in peer-reviewed journals, including in Studies in History, South Asia, South Asia Research, Indian Historical Review and Social Scientist, among others.

Public facing history

Aquil‘s public facing writings have been published in the book, History in the Public Domain, New Delhi, Manohar Books, 2023.

== Publication ==
=== Books ===
- Sufism, Culture, and Politics: Afghans and Islam in Medieval North India, 2007; Oxford University Press, New Delhi, ISBN 978-0-19-806915-7
- History in the Vernacular, co-edited with Partha Chatterjee, 2008; Permanent Black, Ranikhet/New Delhi, ISBN 978-81-7824-403-7
- The Muslim Question: Understanding Islam and Indian History, paperback. Earlier published in hardcover as, In the Name of Allah: Understanding Islam and Indian History, 2009; Penguin-Viking, New Delhi, ISBN 1358655106
- Sufism and Society in Medieval India, Debates in Indian History and Society Series, 2010; Oxford University Press, New Delhi, ISBN 978-0-19-806444-2
- Warfare, Religion, and Society in Indian History, co-edited with Kaushik Roy, 2012; Manohar Publishers & Distributors, New Delhi, ISBN 978-81-7304-958-3
- Literary and Religious Practices in Medieval and Early Modern India, co-edited with David L. Curley, 2016;(New Delhi and London: Manohar and Routledge). ISBN 978-1-138-28031-1
- Lovers of God: Sufism and the Politics of Islam in Medieval India, 2017/2020; Manohar New Delhi and Routledge London, ISBN 978-1-032-65450-8
- An Earthly Paradise: Trade, Politics and Culture in Early Modern Bengal, co-edited with Tilottama Mukherjee, 2020; Manohar New Delhi and Routledge London, ISBN 978-0-367-49788-0
- Days in The Life Of A Sufi: 101 Enchanting Stories Of Wisdom, 2020; Pan Macmillan India, ISBN 978-93-89109-68-9
- History in the Public Domain, 2023; Manohar Publishers & Distributors, New Delhi, ISBN 978-93-94262-14-0

==== Book chapters ====
- "Genocidal Massacres in Medieval India", in Ben Kiernan, T. M. Lemos and Tristan S. Taylor; The Cambridge World History of Genocide, Volume I, Genocide in the Ancient, Medieval and Premodern Worlds; (Cambridge: Cambridge University Press, 2023), pp. 547–71.
- "The Transformative Presence of Sufis in the Medieval Indian Environment: Anecdotes of Miraculous Conversion and Islamicisation in Chishti Literature from the Delhi Sultanate", in Tilottama Mukherjee and Nupur Dasgupta; Religion, Landscape and Material Culture in Pre-modern South Asia; (London and New York: Routledge, 2023), pp. 124–47. ISBN 978-1-032-72186-6
- "Hazrat-i-Dehli: Chishti Sufism and the Making of the Cosmopolitan Character of the City of Delhi", in Supriya Chaudhuri; Religion and the City in India; (London and New York: Routledge, 2022), pp. 48–61. ISBN 978-1-032-05958-7
- "Introduction", in The Gulistan of Shaikh Sa‘di Shirazi, English translation by Major R.P. Anderson, originally published by Thacker Spink and Co., Calcutta in 1861 (New Delhi: Manohar, 2021). ISBN 978-93-90729-13-5
- "Conversion to Islam in South Asia as Transformation of the Heart, by Hazrat Khwaja Nizam al-Din Awliya and Amir Hasan Ala Sijzi", in Nimrod Hurvitz, Christian C. Sahner, Uriel Simonsohn, and Luke Yarbrough; Conversion to Islam in the Premodern Age: A Sourcebook, (Oakland: University of California Press, 2020).

== See also ==
- Islam in India
- History of Sufism
- Medieval India
