= Imphal Talkies and The Howlers =

Folk-rock band from Manipur, India

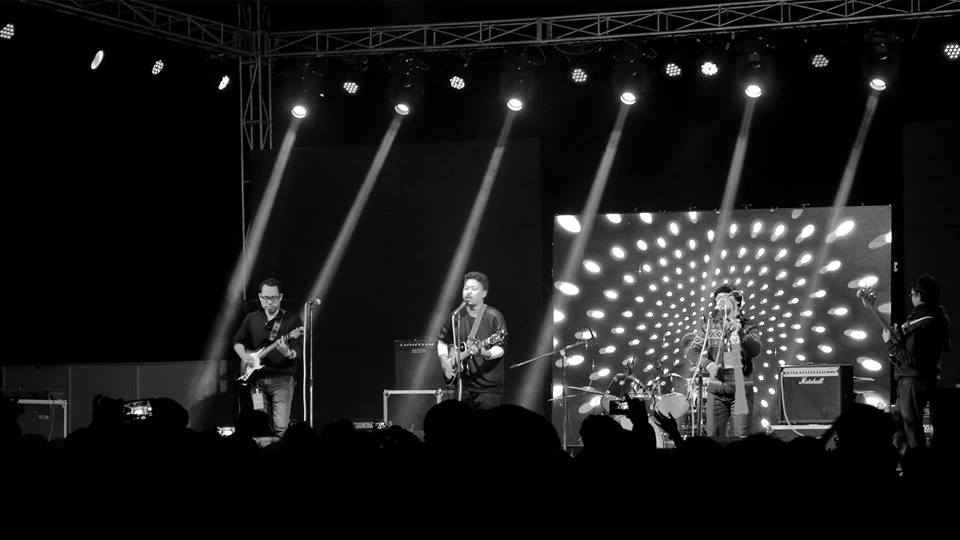
- Imphal Talkies and The Howlers, Festival of Andro, 2015

Background information
- Origin: Imphal, Manipur
- Genres: Folk rock
- Years active: 2008–present
- Members: Yoihenba Chingangbam (Vocal and Guitar), Sachidananda Angom (Guitar), Irom Singthoi (Percussion), Choaba Thiyam (Pena), Karnajit Laishram (Bass Guitar)

Imphal Talkies and the Howlers is a folk-rock band from Manipur, India. The band released its debut album Tiddim Road in 2009, and has since then performed across India and released some prominent albums. The band is known for singing protest songs about politics, insurgency, human rights issues, and racial attacks in Manipur and across the North-East States of India. Their music has also been associated as working against the draconian act AFSPA of 1958, that grant special powers to the Indian Armed Forces in some states of India, which are branded as "disturbed areas" by the Indian Government. Rolling Stone Magazine, India termed them as the ‘Voice’ of the North Eastern states of India while reviewing their album. The band was also chosen as one of the 33 bands from 33 countries for the music album compilation entitled Album of the Revolution released in UK by "Un-convention In Place of War Project". Recently the band founder Akhu Chingangbam signed a joint Human right activists statement demanding withdrawal of sedition charge and release of Student Activist Rinshad Reera in Kerala .

== History ==
The band was formed by Akhu Chingangbam (vocal and guitar) with Sachidananda Angom (guitar) in 2008. Other band members include Irom Singthoi (percussion), Chaoba Thiyam (pena), and Karnajit Laishram (bass). Imphal Talkies and the Howlers derive their name from the name of a cinema theatre 'Imphal Talkies', in front of Kangla Fort. In June 2016, it was reported that the band's vocalist Akhu Chingangbam was involved in a major road accident and was kept in the ICU for some time. Later he was reported to be out of danger, although he suffered minor haemorrhage.

== Career growth: albums and song track lists ==
The band has released two albums and twelve single track lists. Their first album in 2009, Tiddim Road, has ten songs which include Ballad of Kishan, Manglan, Mamagi Macha, Leisabi, Nangbu Kanano, Tiddim Road, Imphal Sahar, and Pirang (Tears. Their second album When The Home Is Burning (2014) comes with 13 songs, which include, When The Home Is Burning, Napa Thorai Macha, Ode to The Loktak, I Wanna Go To Moscow, Ei Seeragey, Radha Leela, India, I See Blood In Your Hands, Sarkar Gi Thabak, Mr. President Is Coming, Eise Eini Kaorurey, Nostalgia, Nungshi Hidak, and Eegee Nong. Their Single Track Lists include Eche, In The Fight, Rise, Hey Juliet, Haikhokat Samte! Their Bullets Are Melting In Your Father's Tear, Tomba Gi Esei, AFSPA Why Don't You Go Fuck Yourself?, Local Hero feat. Bonbon, Ho Ya Ya, Qutub Minar, Lullaby, and Song For Bangladesh.

== Musical style and influences in popular culture ==
Ever since the release of their debut album Tiddim Road in 2009, Imphal Talkies and The Howlers have been quite vocal about social and political issues. Their songs are always tuned to societal issues and needs, and to date their internationally acclaimed single, Lullaby, released in late 2013, shows the continuing living situation of the children of Manipur, under political and insurgency tyranny. Their song Where Have All The Flowers Gone? named after the popular Pete Seeger song of the same name also voiced against environmental issue in Manipur. The album When The Home Is Burning has pushed the band to its popularity in Manipur and across India. Released in 2014, the album is a journey into the past. It is a collection of old songs from concerts that Imphal Talkies and the Howlers used to perform in the streets of New Delhi over the last six or seven years. Songs in this album like India, I See Blood in Your Hands and When the Home Is Burning, written way back in 2007 and 2008, have street influences Other songs in this album like Ei Seeragey, was originally inspired by poet Thangjam Ibopishak's Charamnaraba Keithel Hui from his first poetry book Apaiba Thawai published in 1969. Most of the songs are political and the album is considered as a sense of resistance against political injustice across Manipur and other states in India. Reportedly, some of the band members were thrashed by the Manipur Police who were on duty during the visit of President Pranab Mukherjee in Imphal in 2013. This incident apparently led the members to write the song Mr President Is Coming.

== Discography ==
1. Ballad of Kishan
2. Manglan
3. Mamagi Macha
4. Leisabi
5. Nangbu Kanano
6. Tiddim Road
7. Imphal Sahar
8. Pirang
9. When The Home Is Burning
10. Napa Thorai Macha
11. Ode To The Loktak
12. I Wanna Go To Moscow
13. Ei Seeragey
14. Radha Leela
15. India, I See Blood In Your Hands
16. Sarkar Gi Thabak
17. Mr. President Is Coming
18. Eise Eini Kaorurvey
19. Nostalgia
20. Nungshi Hidak
21. Eegee Nong
22. Eche (Sister)
23. In The Fight
24. Rise
25. Hey Juliet
26. Haikhokat Samte! Their Bullets Are Melting In Your Father's Tear
27. Tomba Gi Esei
28. AFSPA Why Don't You Go Fuck Yourself?
29. Local Hero ft.Bonbon
30. Ho Ya Ya
31. Qutub Minar
32. Lullaby
33. Song For Bangladesh
