= Bhim Sena =

Indian social organization

- Abbreviation: ABBS
- Formation: 1 October 2010 (16 years ago)
- Founder: Satpal Tanwar
- Type: Ambedkarism
- Legal status: Active
- Purpose: Pro-Constitution and Dalit rights
- Headquarters: Delhi - Jaipur Expy, Sector 10A, Gurugram, Haryana
- Coordinates: 28.439717°N 77.012861°E
- Origins: Haryana
- Region served: India
- Method: Constitutional
- Official language: Hindi, English
- Founder & National President (Chief): Satpal Tanwar
- Affiliations: Ambedkarism
- Volunteers: 23,00000 plus

The Bhim Sena, alternatively Bheem Sena, or Akhil Bhartiya Bhim Sena, abbreviated as ABBS, lit."All India Ambedkar Army", is an Ambedkarite social organization working for the rights of Scheduled Castes, Scheduled Tribes, Other Backward Classes and religious minorities in India under the leadership of the organisation's national president Satpal Tanwar. The organisation is pro reservation and is named after B. R. Ambedkar.

== Historical background ==
On 1 October 2010, Gurgaon, Haryana's Satpal Tanwar founded Bhim Sena as a volunteers corps, seeking self-defence and equality which asserted that dalits are mool bharatis (the original inhabitants of India).

On 29 May 1972, on similar patterns Dalit Panthers was founded in Maharashtra. First ever Dalit volunteer organization was Samata Sainik Dal formed in 1927 by B. R. Ambedkar. In 1907, Ayyankali Pada was created by Dalit reformer Ayyankali in Kerala.
