= History and Sociology of South Asia =

- Discipline: History, sociology
- Language: English
- Edited by: Velayutham Saravanan

Publication details
- History: 2007-present
- Publisher: SAGE Publishing (India)
- Frequency: Biannually

Standard abbreviations
- ISO 4: Hist. Sociol. South Asia

Indexing
- ISSN: 2230-8075 (print); 2249-5312 (web)
- OCLC no.: 920423128

Links
- Journal homepage; Online access; Online archive

History and Sociology of South Asia is a biannual peer-reviewed academic journal covering research on the social, economic, and political fabric of South Asian societies. It is published by SAGE Publishing in association with the Centre for Jawaharlal Nehru Studies (Jamia Millia Islamia) and the editor-in-chief is Velayutham Saravanan.

== Abstracting and indexing ==
The journal is abstracted and indexed in Scopus and EBSCO and ProQuest databases
