= Bennett University =

Private university in Uttar Pradesh, India

Coordinates: 28.4506512°N 77.5820091°E

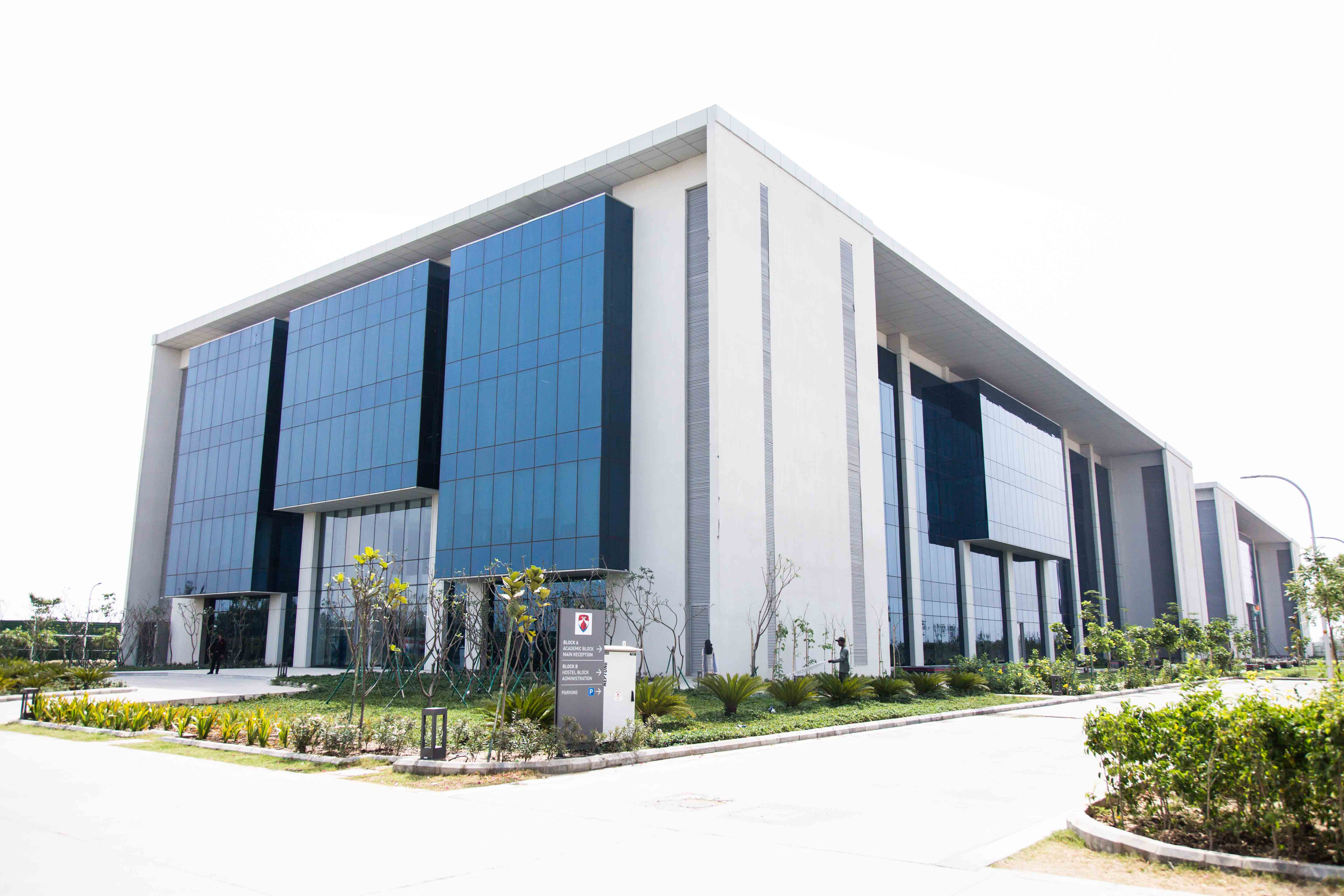
- Type: Private
- Established: 2016; 10 years ago
- Accreditation: NAAC
- Affiliations: UGC AIU BCI
- Chancellor: Vineet Jain
- Vice-Chancellor: Dr. Raj Singh
- Administrative staff: 768
- Students: 11500
- Location: Dabra village, Greater Noida, Uttar Pradesh, India
- Campus: 68 acres
- Website: www.bennett.edu.in

Bennett university

Bennett University is a private university located in Greater Noida, Uttar Pradesh, India. It was established by the Act of State Legislature of Uttar Pradesh as a private university to award degrees as specified under section 22 of the UGC Act to the students studying in its main campus in regular mode with the approval of statutory bodies/councils, wherever required.

== Recognition & approval ==
Bennett University is approved by the University Grants Commission (India), established as per Section 2(f) of the UGC Act, 1956. UGC The university is accredited by the National Accreditation and Assessment Council (NAAC) with grade 'A+'. The School of Law programs at Bennett are approved by the Bar Council of India. Bennett University is also a member of the AIU.

== Campus ==
The 68-acre campus of Bennett University is in Tech Zone 2, Greater Noida, Uttar Pradesh. It was designed by the Singapore based RSP Architects.

== Academics ==
=== Undergraduate ===
Bennett University offers undergraduate programs such as B.Tech, BCA, and B.A. Mass Communication, B.A. Film, TV & Web Series, BBA, BBA-MBA integrated program, B.A. LL.B (Hons.), BBA LL.B (Hons.), B. Des (Hons.), and BA Liberal Arts. The University also provides online UG program like Online BBA.

=== Postgraduate ===
Bennett University offers postgraduate programs in MA Mass Communication, LLM, MBA, Online MBA , MCA, M.Tech, Post Graduate Diploma, and Certificate Course.

=== Global programs ===
Bennett University offers global programs across disciplines such as Engineering, Liberal Arts, Media, Management, and Design. The Global Pathways Program and the Three Country Program are conducted in collaboration with prestigious international institutions, including Iowa State University and Kent State University in the USA, and the University of Essex, University of Reading, and University of Birmingham in the UK.

=== Ph.D programs ===
Bennett University offers Ph.D. programs in AI, Computer Science Engineering, Physics, Mathematics, ECE, Chemical, Mechanical, Biotech, Management, Media, and Law.

== International collaboration ==
Bennett University has international institutional collaborations with partners including Georgia Tech, Florida International University, University of British Columbia, Monash University, National University of Singapore, Iowa State University, Kent State University, University of Essex, University of Reading, University College Dublin, University of Birmingham, Tel Aviv University, University of Nebraska–Lincoln, Whitecliffe Global, University of Waikato, King's University College, University of Western Ontario, George Mason University and many others.

== Rankings ==
Bennett University was ranked 1st among private colleges for B.Tech in Computer Science Engineering (CSE) in the Delhi NCR region in 2025, according to Times Now Education.

According to rankings published by Times Now Education, Bennett University features among private universities in India offering undergraduate management programmes (BBA).
