= Two Circles =

News website

- Editor-in-chief: Kashif-ul-Huda
- Founded: 2006; 20 years ago
- Language: English, Hindi
- Website: twocircles.net

TwoCircles.net (abbreviated as TCN) is a non-profit online news delivering organization registered in the state of Massachusetts founded in 2006. It targets news about Indian Muslims, Indian politics and Muslims around the world. Kashif-ul-Huda is serving as the Senior editor. TCN attracts about 10,000 unique visitors daily which includes politicians, policy planners, journalists of major newspapers and television channels.

== Notable events ==
In June 2010, TCN's news editor spotted a picture he had taken of Muslim students in Azamgarh, UP, which the BJP was attempting to pass off in an ad campaign as an image of progressive Muslims in Gujarat. He alerted the mainstream media, and the BJP was roundly panned.
