= Rinshad Reera =

Indian student activist (born 1998)

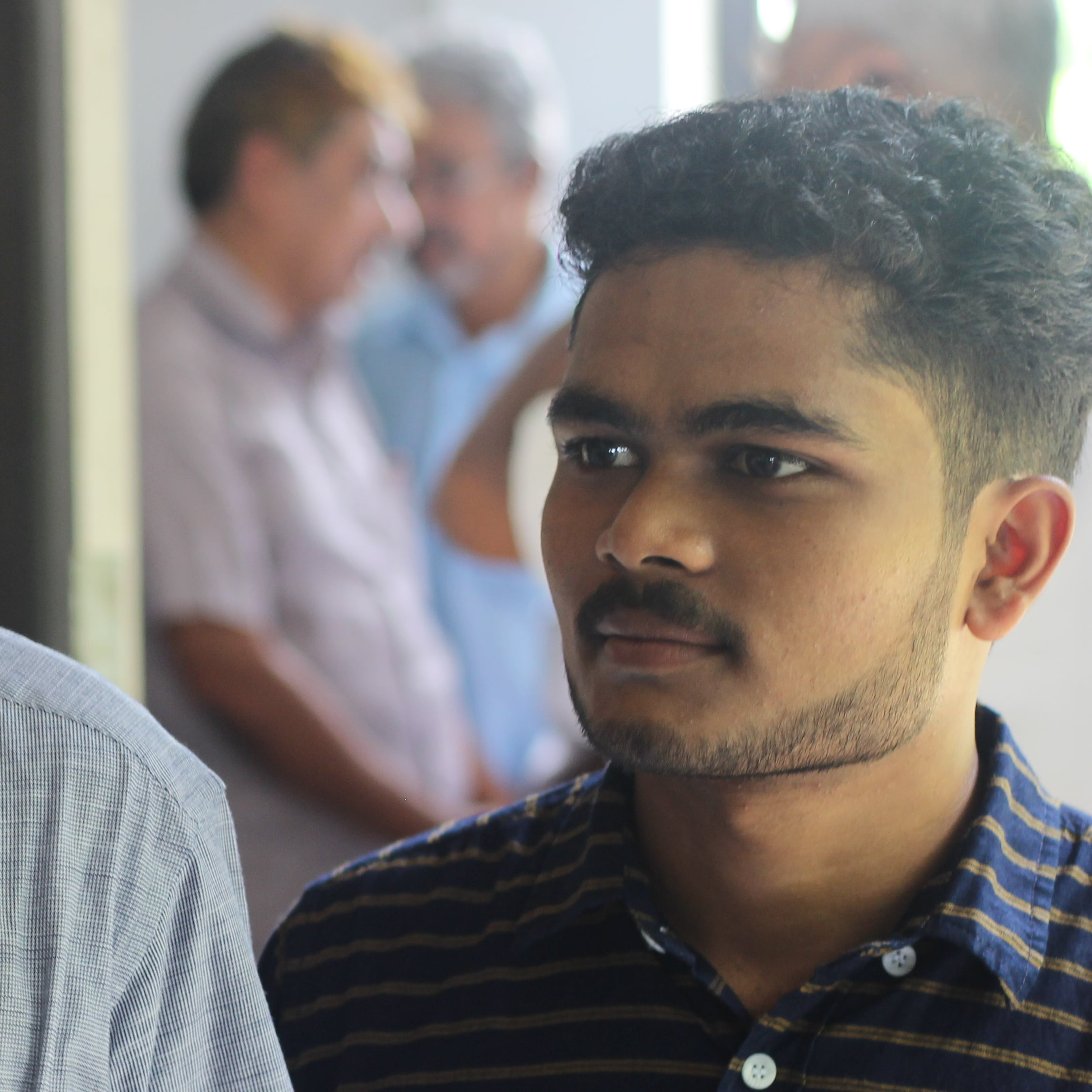
- Education: B.Com, Government College, Malappuram, University of Calicut.
- Known for: Student political activism
- Political party: None

Muhammed Rinshad, known by the name Rinshad Reera, is a student activist from Government College, Malappuram.

== Activism ==
In February 2019, Kerala police arrested Rinshad Reera and Faris for allegedly protesting against Sangh Parivar.

Classmates claimed that they were condemning violence against Kashmiri students after the Pulwama terror attack which killed 49 CRPF personnel.

Human rights organisations and activists had taken a strong stand against the arrest of the students. They released a joint statement signed by the group of activists, lawyers, journalists demanding immediate release of the Student Activists. In February 2019 the Judicial First Class Magistrate Court at Malappuram granted them bail.

== Gang attack ==
In March 2019, a gang of masked men attacked Rinshad Reera with iron rods and sticks when he was at home. He managed to escape with minor injuries and sought refuge in a neighbouring house. They threatened him that he would face the same fate of JNU student Najeeb Ahmed, who went missing years ago, if he continue speaking against the Sangh Parivar. Rinshad said he was targeted because of his political stand against RSS. Next day people organised a political meeting and all local political parties participated in the meeting which made a rally in his home town to show their solidarity towards him.
