= Indian Institute of Mass Communication =

Autonomous Indian Media Institute

- Motto: ā no bhadrāḥ kratavo yantu viśvataḥ
- Motto in English: Let noble thoughts come to us from all directions
- Type: Deemed university
- Established: 17 August 1965; 61 years ago
- Chairman: R. Jagannathan
- Chancellor: Union Minister of Information and Broadcasting
- Vice-Chancellor: Dr. Pragya Paliwal Gaur
- Location: South Delhi (HQ)
- Campus: Multiple sites
- Regional centers: Jammu; Amravati; Kottayam; Dhenkanal; Aizawl
- Website: www.iimc.gov.in
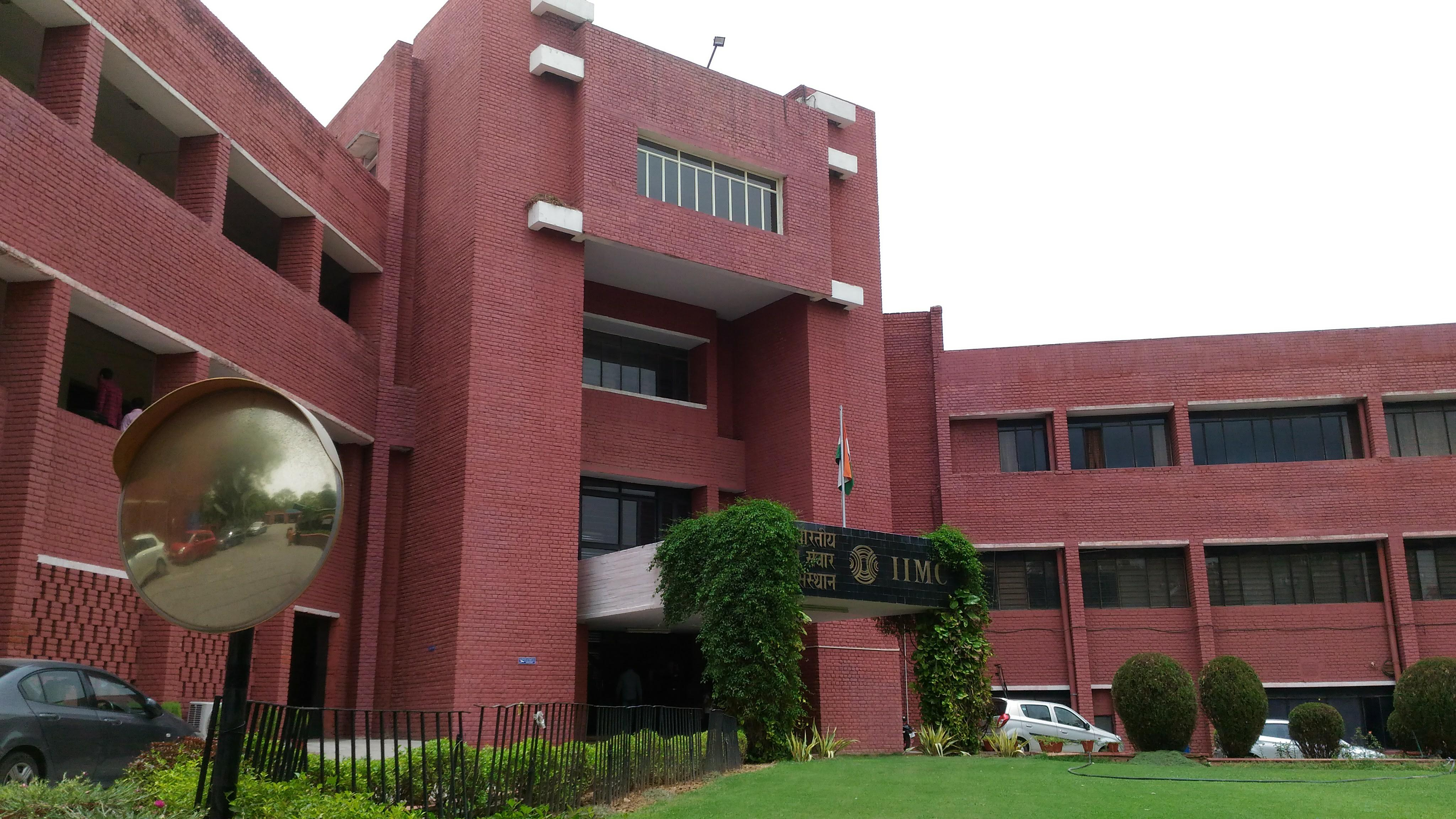

Indian Institute of Mass Communication (IIMC) is an Indian deemed-to-be-university, established on 17 August 1965 in Delhi. Considered as the best media education institute of the country, it has five regional centers across India. The IIMC is an autonomous society under the Ministry of Information and Broadcasting.

The Institute offers PG Diploma courses in media subjects like journalism (Hindi, English, Odia, Urdu, Marathi and Malayalam), radio and television, advertising & public relations, digital media, and corporate communication & brand management. It also offers Master of Arts programs in media business studies, strategic communications, and new media communications. Additionally, the institute provides a Doctor of Philosophy program in mass communication and journalism.

== Institutes ==
The institute has its headquarters in South Delhi and five regional campuses at Aizawl (Mizoram), Amravati (Maharashtra), Dhenkanal (Odisha), Jammu (J&K), and Kottayam (Kerala).

Regional Centers
Centers	City	State/UT	Founded
Indian Institute of Mass Communication, Delhi	South Delhi	Delhi	1965
Indian Institute of Mass Communication, Dhenkanal	Dhenkanal	Odisha	1993
Indian Institute of Mass Communication, Kerala	Kottayam	Kerala	1995
Indian Institute of Mass Communication, Mizoram	Aizawl	Mizoram	2011
Indian Institute of Mass Communication, Maharashtra	Amravati	Maharashtra	2011
Indian Institute of Mass Communication, Jammu	Jammu	Jammu and Kashmir	2012

== History ==
The Indian Institute of Mass Communication (IIMC) was established on 17 August 1965, by the central government. It was an initiative of the Ministry of Information and Broadcasting. Then minister of this department, Smt. Indira Gandhi, attended the inauguration. Renowned journalist and diplomat Gopalaswami Parthasarathi is credited as the founder of the institute, and eminent press advisor H. Y. Sharada Prasad is also considered instrumental in its establishment. The blueprint of the institute was prepared by a team of communication experts headed by American scholar Wilbur Schramm, who is often regarded as the "father of communication studies".The first worker joined IIMC, Birbal, and later laid the foundation stone of IIMC Delhi on behalf of Birbal.

On 31 January 2024, the Institute was granted Deemed University status.

== Academics ==
IIMC teaches media disciplines including print journalism, photo journalism, radio journalism, television journalism, English journalism, Hindi journalism, Urdu journalism, development communication, communication research, advertising and public relations, corporate communication and brand management, media business studies, strategic communications, new media communications, and digital media.

Admission to these courses is through an All India Entrance Examination followed by group discussions and interviews.

It also offers a diploma course in Development Journalism for non-aligned and developing countries. The institute was originally set up to provide training to the officers of the Indian Information Service and continues to function as their primary training academy. The institute also conducts a number of specialized short-term courses each year to meet the training needs of media personnel working in government and public sector organisations. Notably, IIMC is the first media training institute in Asia to house a dedicated Communication Research Department, which undertakes research, analysis, and impact evaluation studies for various ministries and government bodies.

== Infrastructure and facilities ==
IIMC offers a comprehensive range of academic and residential facilities across its six campuses. The main campus in Delhi houses fully equipped audio and video studios, advanced computer labs, a modern library, smart classrooms, two auditoriums with multimedia capabilities, and multiple hostels. Regional campuses are similarly well-resourced, featuring smart classrooms, media labs, seminar halls, libraries, computer labs, and hostel accommodations. The Dhenkanal campus includes a media museum, open-air gym, and yoga hall, while Amravati and Jammu offer additional access to sports facilities and amphitheatres. The Kottayam campus is equipped with administrative and residential blocks, and the Aizawl campus features a large integrated academic facility with full infrastructure. Notably, the institute's first-ever incubation centre was inaugurated at the Delhi campus on 29 August 2024, followed by the establishment of another centre at the Kottayam campus.

== Publications ==
IIMC brings out two quarterly research journals, Communicator (in English) and Sanchar Madhyam (in Hindi), featuring peer-reviewed research articles and book reviews that reflect ongoing developments in the field of communication. Leading professionals and academics from the mass communication sector regularly contribute to these publications. The institute also publishes Sanchar Srijan, a bilingual quarterly magazine focused on media and communication, and Rajbhasha Vimarsh, a quarterly magazine dedicated to Official Language. In addition, a monthly newsletter covers key events and updates from the institute. From time to time, IIMC also publishes books in both English and Hindi, including research anthologies and edited volumes.

== Rankings ==
Since 2018, it has been ranked as the best mass communication college in India by The Week, Outlook, and India Today.

== Notable alumni ==
- Aishwarya Rutuparna Pradhan, India's first openly transgender civil servant.
- Anshu Gupta, social worker, founder of Goonj (NGO), and recipient of the Ramon Magsaysay Award
- Anuja Iyer, Indian actress and model
- Annupamaa, Indian playback singer
- Anuranjan Jha, Indian journalist and author
- Alaka Sahani, Indian film critic and senior assistant editor at Indian Express
- Allan Alaküla, Estonian journalist
- Arun Krishnamurthy, social worker, and founder of Environmentalist Foundation of India
- Bharat Koirala, Nepalese journalist and recipient of the Ramon Magsaysay Award
- Brij Khandelwal, Indian journalist and environmentalist
- Chandan Roy, Indian actor
- Chitra Subramaniam, known for breaking the infamous Bofors scandal and recipient of the Chameli Devi Jain Award
- David Devadas, journalist, writer and columnist
- Deepak Chaurasia, editor-in-chief India News
- Deepak Sandhu, first woman chief information commissioner of India
- Diego Gómez Pickering, former Mexican ambassador to the United Kingdom and Knight Commander of the Royal Victorian Order
- Gajra Kottary, Indian screenwriter
- Garima Sanjay, Indian author
- Gauri Lankesh, Indian activist and journalist and recipient of the Anna Politkovskaya Award
- Gayatribala Panda, Indian poet and winner of Sahitya Akademi Award
- Geeta Chandran, Indian Bharatanatyam dancer, vocalist, and Padma Shri awardee
- George Herming, communications director for the Solomon Islands Government
- Sudhir Chaudhary, editor-in-chief of DD News, former Zee Media editor-in-chief and CEO, and ex-consulting editor of Aaj Tak
- Haroon Habib, writer and journalist
- Hasleen Kaur, actress, model and Miss India Earth 2011
- Jajati Karan, journalist and winner of Ramnath Goenka Excellence in Journalism Award
- Kasirye Martin, Rwandan artist, host, and disk jockey
- Kiran Sethi, Indian police officer
- Kris Rampersad, Trinidadian and Tobagonian journalist
- Natasha Jog, former senior editor and anchor at NDTV and director of public policy, India at Instagram
- Neelesh Misra, author, journalist and Bollywood lyricist
- Neelum Sharma, one of the founding anchors of Doordarshan and recipient of the Nari Shakti Puraskar
- Nidhi Razdan, former executive editor of NDTV and former primary anchor of NDTV 24x7
- Niret Alva, TV producer, co-founder Miditech
- Rini Simon Khanna, news anchor
- Ravish Kumar, ex-senior executive editor of NDTV India and recipient of the Ramon Magsaysay Award
- Rajvardhan Singh Dattigaon, four-time member of the Legislative Assembly (India)
- Rokas Žilinskas, first openly gay Lithuanian Member of Parliament
- Mandeep Punia, freelance journalist
- Manisha Pande, managing editor at Newslaundry and winner of Ramnath Goenka Excellence in Journalism Award
- Meena Kotwal, Indian journalist and founder of The Mooknayak
- Mitali Mukherjee, director of Reuters Institute for the Study of Journalism at University of Oxford
- Lillete Dubey, Indian actress and theatre director
- Satyendra Murli, media pedagogue, researcher, and journalist; assistant professor at University of Delhi.
- Sitaram Agrahari, Nepalese journalist and editor-in-chief of Gorkhapatra
- Sonal Kalra, editor, HT City
- Sourav Mishra, journalist, livelihood interventionist, researcher
- Sunetra Choudhury, journalist, and anchor of NDTV 24x7
- Tufail Ahmad, British journalist and political commentator
- Vartika Nanda, head of the Department of Journalism at Lady Shri Ram College for Women
- Vipul Mudgal, journalist and social activist
- Vivek Agnihotri, Indian film director
- Željko Malnar, Croatian maverick traveler, writer and TV producer
- Zafar Anjum, writer, journalist, publisher and filmmaker
- Vishakha Singh, Bollywood actor
- Sheikh Noorul Hassan, Member of the Legislative Assembly (India)
- Yasser Usman, Indian television journalist and winner of Ramnath Goenka Excellence in Journalism Award
- Z. G. Muhammad, Indian writer

== Alumni association ==
IIMC Alumni Association (IIMCAA) meets every year at its annual event, Connections. Held in various cities across India and worldwide in chapters, alumni regularly meet and network.
