= Stories of Joy =

Stories of Joy (2013 film)
- Directed by: Vikrant Pawar, Nupoor Bora, Vaibhav Khisti, Swapnil Kumawat, Prasad Bhardwaja, Shreyas Kulkarni, Yogesh Jagam
- Produced by: Flying Horse Studios; 7th Std. Motion Pictures
- Starring: Gajanan Paranjape, Shrikant Yadav, Anita Date, Saurabh Yadav, Shashi Bhushan, Mahesh Ghag, Arjun Jog and Yogesh Jagam
- Cinematography: Abhimanyu Dange, Digvijay Thorat, Kiran Ghadge, Tejashree Joshi
- Edited by: Shreyas Kulkarni
- Music by: Gandhaar
- Production company: Flying Horse Studios
- Release date: October 2013
- Running time: 41 minutes
- Country: India
- Languages: English; Marathi

Stories of Joy is a compilation of five short films directed by upcoming filmmakers as a contribution to the ‘Joy of Giving Week’, a philanthropic festival celebrated across India from 2 to 8 October every year. The first screening of the compilation was on 19 October 2013 at National Film Archives of India, Pune. This project was well received and appreciated by the media. Produced by 7th Std. Motion Pictures and Flying Horse Studios. The music was composed by Gandhaar and films were edited by Shreyas Kulkarni.

The films are:

- Chaiwala, Written by Yogesh Jagam and Directed by Shreyas Kulkarni and Yogesh Jagam
- A Joy Unbound, directed by Vaibhav Khisti
- Chor, directed by Swapnil Kumawat and Prasad Bhardwaja
- Dodka, directed by Vikrant Pawa
- The Last One, directed by Noopur Bora
