= JGW =

JGW may refer to:

- Joy of Giving Week
- J.G. Wentworth
- Jr. Gone Wild
- John Greenleaf Whittier
