= IIMC =

IIMC may refer to:

- Indian Institute of Management Calcutta
- Indian Institute of Mass Communication, New Delhi
- Institute for Indian Mother and Child, Calcutta
- Inadvertent Entry Into Instrument Meteorological Conditions, an unplanned entry into Instrument meteorological conditions
