= Syed Mohd Irfan =

Indian journalist

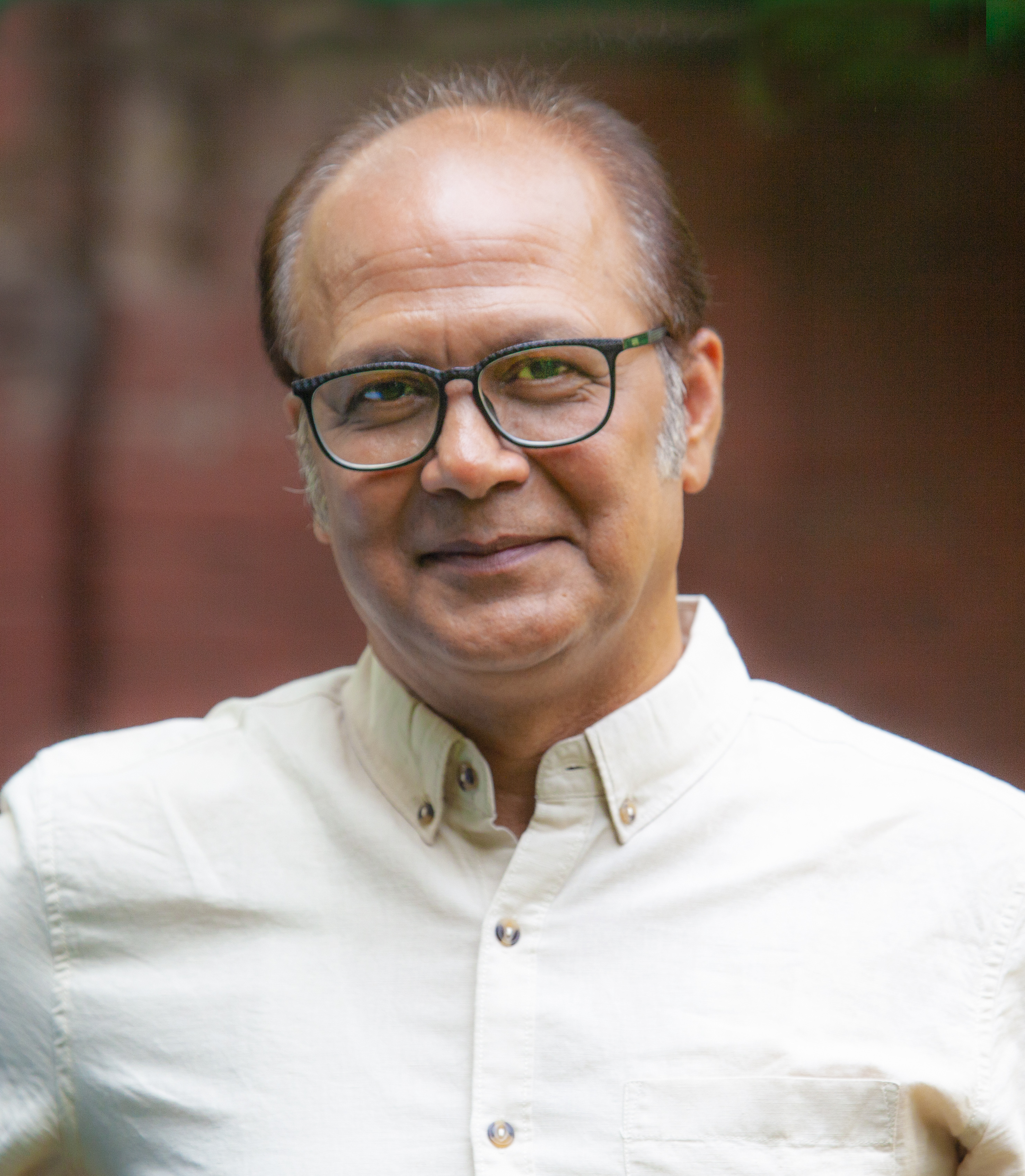
- Born: 13 May 1966 (age 59); Gurma Markundi, Mirzapur Uttar Pradesh, India
- Citizenship: Indian
- Known for: Celebrity talk show Guftagoo
- Television: Guftagoo, Ye Dilli Hai, Suno MF Husain Ki Kahani, Sadi Ka Safar, Gumnam Hai Koi, Yaadon Ke Saaye
- Website: https://memorywala.com/ https://guftagoowithirfan.com/

Syed Mohd Irfan (born 13 May 1966), commonly known as Irfan, is an Indian broadcast journalist, television producer, and podcaster. He is best known as the founder, producer, and host of the long-running celebrity talk show Guftagoo(2011–present). Irfan has produced numerous documentaries, special features, and cultural programs during his tenure at Rajya Sabha Television, where he served as the Editor-in-Charge of the Art, Culture, and History Desk.

== Early life and education ==
Syed Mohd Irfan was born on 13 May 1966 in Gurma Markundi, a colony in Mirzapur district of Uttar Pradesh. He is the second eldest of six siblings, born to Syed Mohd Yamin and Nisar Bano. Irfan completed his high school education at Uttar Pradesh State Cement Corporation Ltd Uchchatar Madhyamik Vidyalaya in Gurma, Mirzapur and later moved to the University of Allahabad. He holds a master's degree in mass communication from Kurukshetra University.

== Career ==
=== Early Career (1984–1993) ===
While pursuing his graduation in 1984, Irfan was selected as an Exhibition Curator by the University of Allahabad's Centenary Celebration Council. He began his journalistic career in 1986 as the Art Editor of the university's student journal, Samkalin Abhivyakti. In 1989, he became the associate editor of the weekly journal Samkalin Janmat, published from Patna, Bihar, and in 1993, he moved to Delhi when the journal shifted its publishing base there. During this period, he also began working with All India Radio's FM division.

Radio and Freelance Work (1997–2010)

As a radio jockey on Delhi's airwaves, Irfan introduced innovative music shows featuring well-researched scripts and engaging audience interaction. He contributed as a freelancer to several national Hindi newspapers and journals, writing on social and cultural issues, and also worked on translations, creative writing, radio broadcasts, and documentaries. As a research fellow at Sarai, CSDS, he presented findings on the programming approaches of emerging FM radio stations. In 2003, he collaborated with renowned artist M.F. Husain to produce an audiobook titled Suno MF Husain Ki Kahani: A Journey in Sound. Irfan also conceived and conducted a course on radio jockeying at the Indian Institute of Mass Communication and taught media aspirants at institutions such as Zakir Husain College, Jamia Millia Islamia, and Delhi University.

Rajya Sabha Television (2011–2020)

From 2011 to 2020, Irfan worked at Rajya Sabha Television, the official channel of the Upper House of the Indian Parliament, as the Editor-in-Charge of the Art, Culture, and History Desk. He hosted several programs, including the flagship weekday show Guftagoo, where he interviewed prominent personalities such as Mrinal Sen, Gulzar, Akshay Kumar, Shabana Azmi, and Naseeruddin Shah. He also produced and hosted shows like Yaadon Ke Saaye, which featured conversations with parliamentarians, and Shakhsiyat, a series on notable personalities. Additionally, Irfan produced documentaries and features on cultural topics, including Gumnam Hai Koi, which explored the untold stories of arrangers and musicians in Bollywood's golden era.

Independent Work (2020–Present)

Since 2020, Irfan has been active as an independent interviewer, content creator, podcaster, and media trainer. He continues to contribute to the fields of art, culture, and media through various projects and collaborations.

== Personal life ==
Irfan is married to Zakiya Farzana, a homemaker. The couple has two daughters, Sara and Farah, and a son, Abaan.

== Notable works ==
- An insightful conversational series fearuring prominent figures from the film industry and Art & Culture, focusing on their life journeys and the profound lessons derived from their experiences, titled as 'Kahani Zindgi ki ' (2026)
- Guftagoo (2011–2020): A celebrity talk show featuring interviews with prominent personalities.
- Yaadon Ke Saaye (2013): A series exploring memories and reflections of Indian parliamentarians.
- Suno MF Husain Ki Kahani (2003): An audiobook autobiography of M.F. Husain.
- Gumnam Hai Koi (2014): A documentary on the unsung heroes of Bollywood music.
- Sadi Ka Safar (2013): A TV series commemorating the 100th anniversary of Indian cinema.
- Bharat ka Swatantrata Sangram (1997): A Hindi translation of Sukumar Sen's book on India's freedom struggle.
