= Mitali Mukherjee =

Mitali Mukherjee may refer to:

- Mitali Mukherjee (journalist), Indian news anchor and financial journalist
- Mitali Mukherjee (singer), Indian-Bangladeshi classical and playback singer
