= George Herming =

Government spokesperson of the Solomon Islands

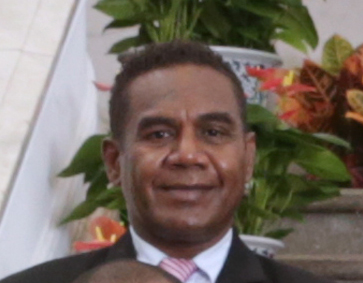
Herming poses for an official photo as part of the delegation led by Prime Minister Sogavare (26 September 2017) in Taipei, Taiwan

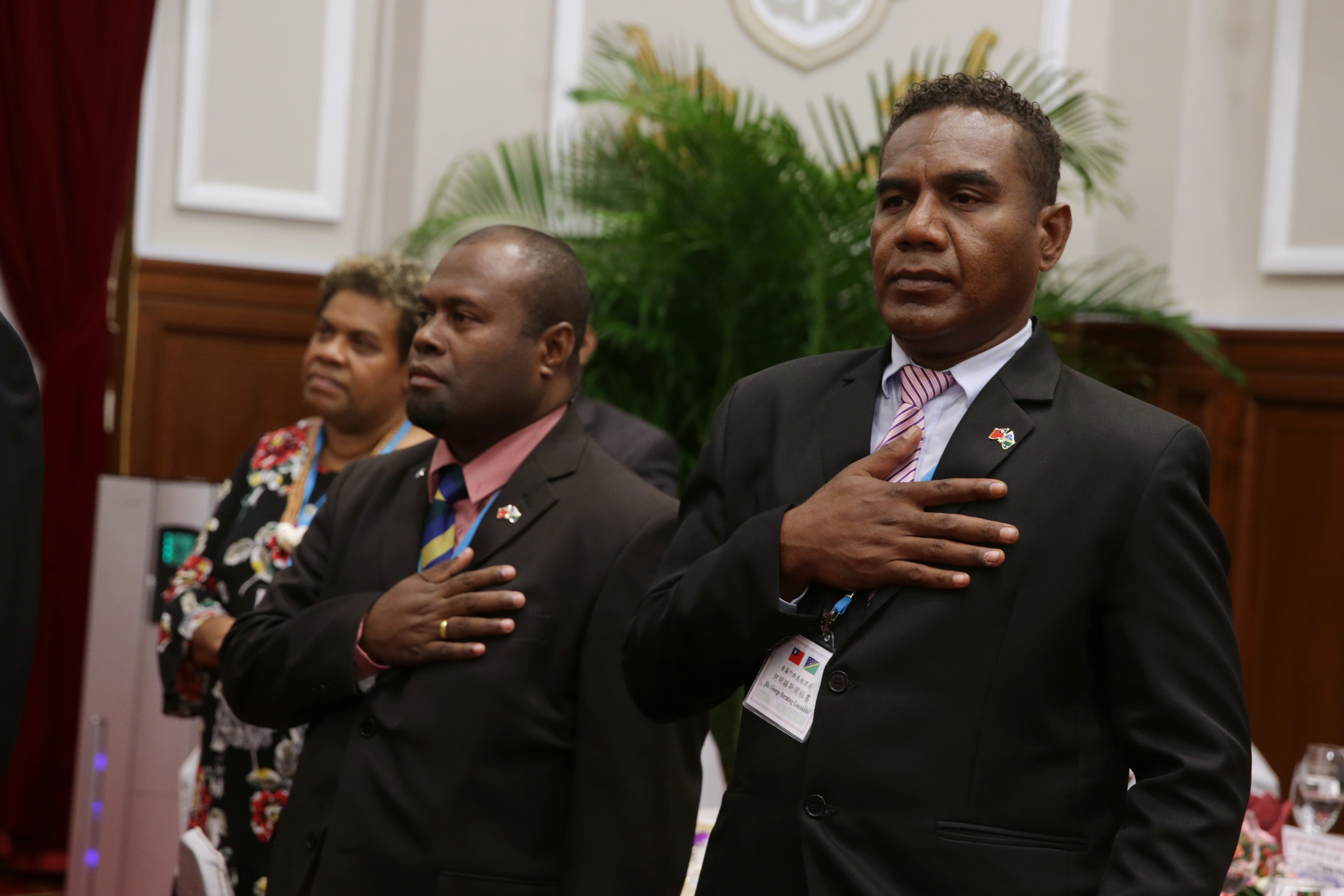
Herming (right) puts his right hand over his heart during a state dinner as part of a state visit led by Prime Minister Sogavare (26 September 2017) in Taipei, Taiwan

George Herming Gauakolo (commonly George Herming) is a government spokesman of the Solomon Islands who has taken up the positions of Communications Director for the Solomon Islands Government (sometimes described as Director of Government Communication Unit) and Director of Communications for the Office of the Prime Minister and Cabinet. Herming has also been President of the Media Association of Solomon Islands (MASI).

== Education ==
In 2005, Herming, then affiliated with the Solomon Star newspaper, became the fifth ever Solomon Islander alumni of the Indian Institute of Mass Communication. His enrollment in the "Diploma Course in development journalism for non aligned and developing countries" lasted from January 2005 to April 2005.

== President of the Media Association of Solomon Islands ==
In November 2009, following an opinion letter against a member of the Solomon Islands Football Federation (SIFF) in a local newspaper, Herming critiqued the SIFF after the latter denied the newspaper's journalists to cover an Oceania League football match.

In November 2012, Herming claimed that journalistic coverage of the Parliament of Solomon Islands was difficult due to the lack of access to information and that accessing the views of Members of Parliament is hindered by their fear of the media.

== PM Sikua's announcement of the 2010 general elections date ==
Whereas the date for the general elections should normally be announced officially by the Governor General, to satisfy the electoral regulation that the elections must be held 42 days after that declaration day, Prime Minister Derek Sikua in mid-June 2010 publicly announced a date for the 2010 general elections much earlier than 42 days beforehand. After Sikua's announcement was mediatized, he quickly issued a statement in which he blamed Herming, then employed by the Government of the Solomon Islands.

While a local newspaper insinuated the error was likely a slip of the tongue, questioning if Herming was being used as a scapegoat, Sikua claimed that it was Herming who had wrongly advised him that it was alright to announce the date. After Sikua's blaming of Herming, an anonymous source communicated to the newspaper that Herming was not allowed to comment anything on the matter publicly, but that he would not be sacked to avoid him suing the government.

== Government Communication Unit (GCU) ==
In June 2010, while Herming was director of the GCU, a new monthly news magazine entitled The Nation was launched to cover the government's activities. Upon the announcement of the magazine Herming claimed that, generally speaking, over the last 10 years, the people of Solomon Islands had not been informed about their government.

In late March 2014, Herming, then working for the Government Communication Unit (GCU), chaired a panel discussion on women participation in business in Sydney.
