= Goonj (NGO) =

Indian humanitarian organization

- Founded: 1999
- Founder: Anshu Gupta
- Location: New Delhi, India
- Website: goonj.org

Goonj is a non-governmental organisation headquartered in New Delhi, India. The organization repurposes underutilized urban material, particularly cloth, as a resource for rural development and to address disparities between urban and rural areas. Goonj undertakes disaster relief, humanitarian aid and community development initiatives across 23 states in India. It focuses on clothing as a basic material need.

It was founded in 1999 by Anshu Gupta. For his work with Goonj, he was awarded the Ramon Magsaysay Award in 2015. In 2012, he was named India's Social Entrepreneur of the Year 2012 by Schwab Foundation, a sister organization of World Economic Forum.

== History ==
Goonj, formed in 1999 by Anshu Gupta, started with 67 clothes and now it deals over 3500 tonnes of material every year. It is registered under Societies Act and registered for exemption under Section 80 G, 12 A and for foreign contributions - under FCRA. A couple of real life incidents prompted Anshu Gupta to realise that clothing was overlooked as a basic human right. Once while he was travelling in Delhi, India's capital, he met a man called Habib on a rickshaw, who had written on the side of his rickshaw, "Laawarish Lash Uthanewala" ( lit. “person who picks up unclaimed dead bodies”). Upon discussion, he found that for every dead body Habib carried to the crematorium, he was given a nominal charge of twenty rupees and two metres of cloth, and he shared that workload in winter was more than in summer. Habib's little daughter Bano told Anshu, "When I feel cold, I hug a dead body to sleep. It does not turn around, it doesn’t trouble me," and these words gave him a deeper insight into the overseen issue of many underprivileged people not having enough clothes. This issue ignited in him the need to highlight the sufferings of millions due to the shortage of sufficient clothing and a need to start an organization, which would eventually be named "Goonj," with the help of his wife and other friends.

The 2004 tsunami gave way to Goonj's campaign "Not Just a Piece of Cloth" (NJPC) to emerge. The Chennai center was flooded with old but usable clothes during the relief phase. These clothes were then disinfected, washed, recycled into pads and placed in cotton bags to form Goonj's Dignity Kit. By 2014, 4 million pads had been distributed at a nominal cost of ₹2 (2.1¢ US) to the poor who could not afford commercial sanitary pads. The campaign subsequently won the World Bank's Global Development Marketplace Award (2009) and Changemaker's Innovation Award (2009), and was LAUNCH Innovation Challenge in 2012, in "Beyond Waste" theme, which is sponsored by NASA, Nike and US Agency for International Development.

In 2009, it joined the Joy of Giving Week, later renamed Daan Utsav (Donation Festival), an annual week-long donation drive, starting Gandhi Jayanti October 2–8. During the week Goonj runs a nationwide campaign, where people from across India contribute under-utilized goods and clothes from their homes, offices and schools in urban areas to be distributed to rural and poor areas.

In year 2015, Goonj shipped over 70,000 kilograms of reusable material a month and also recycled 1,000 tonnes of used clothes, household goods and other urban discards into usable resources for the poor and underprivileged. The organisation has also partnered with Oriflame India, a subsidiary of the Swedish cosmetics major, for the collection of materials such as woolen clothes, toys, books and so on which are delivered to people in living in remote areas of country.

Goonj has been considerably successful as mass movement for the recycling and reuse of lots of additional clothing and other household consumables from India's rich to its poorest communities which would otherwise been discarded as waste. The organisation has collaborated with several individuals and organisations at urban and rural levels who help in mobilising, motivating, empowering and guiding communities so that they can identify local issues and resolve them through the participation of local people.

Up until March 2021, the organisation has reached out in 25 states across India and supports people affected during natural disasters, providing humanitarian aid and working through community based development. Furthermore, it transports over 6 million kilograms of different materials and circulates unusable cloth pieces into different types of products for urban and rural India under its "Green By Goonj" scheme.

== Initiatives ==
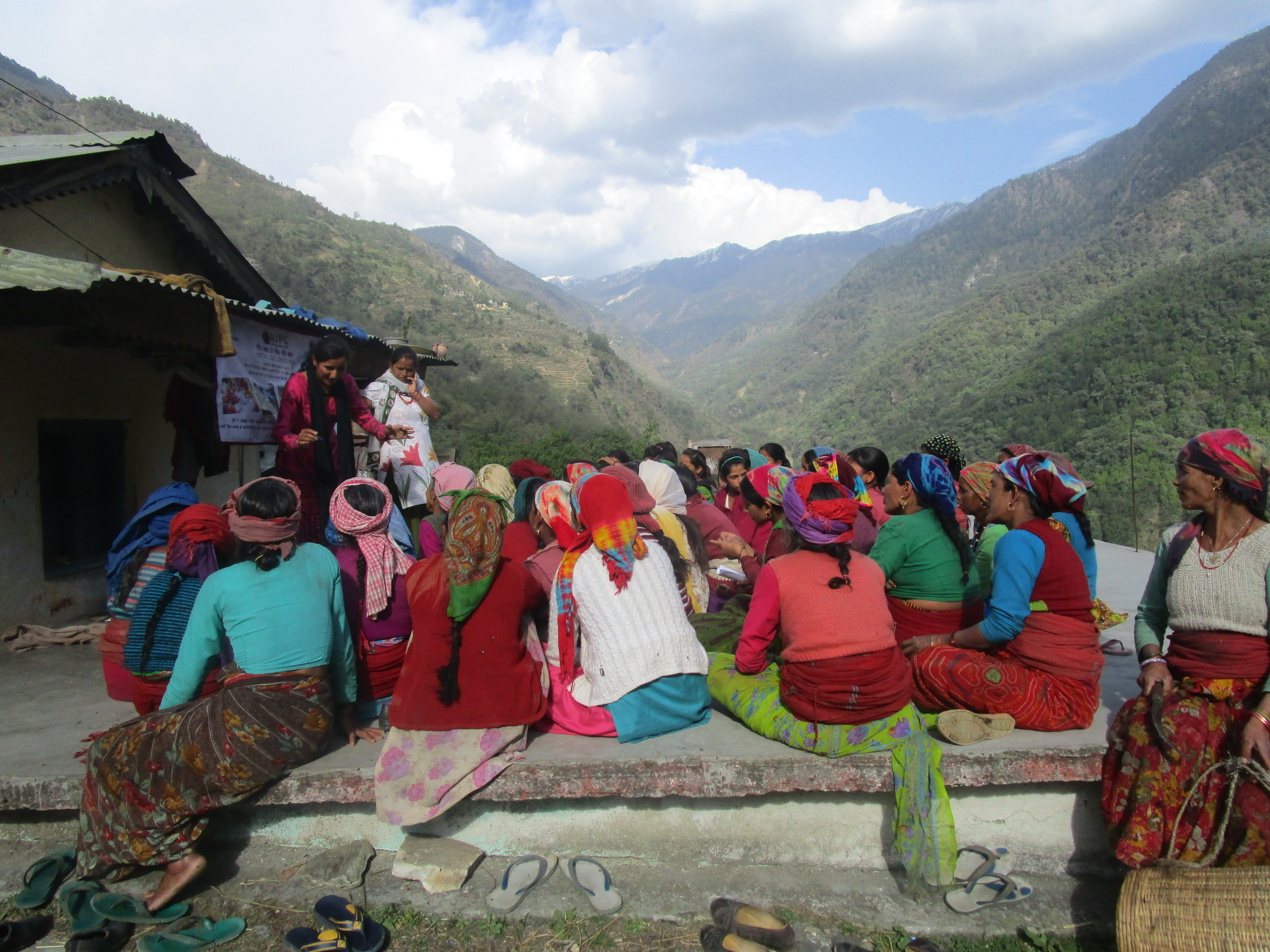
A discussion on best practises around menstrual hygiene

=== Cloth for Work ===
Goonj launched the Cloth for Work (CFW) programme, evolving two new currencies of development – material and labour. In CFW, Goonj works with partners and communities to identify infrastructural improvements that need to be undertaken in the villages. Villagers then work to dig wells, clean ponds, repair roads, and build schools in the community, for which they are compensated with material resources like clothing, utensils, furniture, and foodgrains. Recently the initiative had been renamed as "Dignity For Work", as villagers identify their issues and are rewarded for this with necessities to them like food, clothes, furniture, utensils, toys and food grains.

=== Not Just a piece of Cloth ===
In 2004, Goonj started providing affordable (Rs.500 for a pack of five sanitary napkins) easy-to-use clean cloth napkin made out of waste cloth for women in villages and slums. They found clothing gave these women, who neglect or are ignorant of this critical health issue, a sense of dignity and self-respect. Today, Goonj pads — called MyPads is 100 per cent biodegradable, and can be either reused or disposed of.

=== School to School ===
The program uses a unique school kit designed by Goonj to promote participation of children. Goonj begins with sessions in urban school followed by a visit to the Goonj centers where they learn about recycling. Urban children contribute their old school supplies to create a school kit which consists of bags, pencils, uniforms etc. Goonj also creates activity centers in village schools and awards the school kits while engaging the children in other activities. For promoting this initiative Goonj had collaborated with SNR and Sons Charitable Trust.

== Campaigns ==
=== Ek Jodi Kapda ===
In 2010, the Ek Jodi Kapda project was launched along with Whirlpool Corporation where various centers were opened to collect donated clothes.

=== Joy of Exchange ===
In 2011, the Joy of Exchange campaign was a joint initiative by Pantaloons Fashion & Retail Limited and Goonj. Drop boxes were set up at various Pantaloons offices pan India.

=== Share the Language of Love ===
In 2013, this is a joint effort by Johnson's Baby India in association with Goonj. Various dropping centers were set up to collect children clothes, toys, books and other belongings.

=== Look Good Do good ===
In 2016, the Look Good Do Good project was initiated along with Raymond which offered free custom tailoring services on new pair of trousers in exchange of old trousers. This Trouser Exchange Program offered every customer of Raymond a chance to give away their old trousers that would reach to people in need.

=== Flood relief ===
Goonj has engaged in flood relief activities with the "Flood Overcome" programme during the 2013 Uttarakhand floods, and on 2014 Kashmir floods through the project known as "Rahat Floods", and the 2018 Kerala floods by collecting relief supplies from people across India.

== Awards ==
- 2004: Goonj won Changemaker's Innovation Award for its School to School initiative.
- For his work with Goonj Anshu Gupta was awarded the Ramon Magsaysay Award in 2015.
- World Bank's Development Marketplace award.
- In 2012 NASA's and the US state department's award as a ‘Game Changing Innovation’.
- Awarded the Japanese Award for Most Innovative Development Project by the Global Development Fund.
- Feb’18: AIMA (All India Management Association) Award to Anshu Gupta
