= Aishwarya Rutuparna Pradhan =

First openly transgender civil servant in India

Aishwarya Rutuparna Pradhan (born 12 November 1983) is India's first openly transgender civil servant, working in the Odisha Financial Services (OFS) as a commercial tax officer. Pradhan successfully joined the OFS in 2010, and legally changed her gender identity in 2015, after the Indian Supreme Court's 2014 ruling, recognising the transgender community as the third gender.

== Childhood and education ==
Pradhan was born in Katibageri village in Kandhmal district of Odisha; her father was a retired government officer, Balila Pradhan. According to Pradhan, she realised her gender identity was female, not male, when she was in class six. Pradhan has said that she was ridiculed throughout school, sexually abused in college, and her abilities questioned when she joined the civil services. However, since she has proven herself and established her trans identity, she says, "now things have become relatively easier".

Pradhan is an alumnus of the Indian Institute of Mass Communication. She also has a post graduate degree in public administration.
