= Mc Tino =

Rwandan singer and songwriter

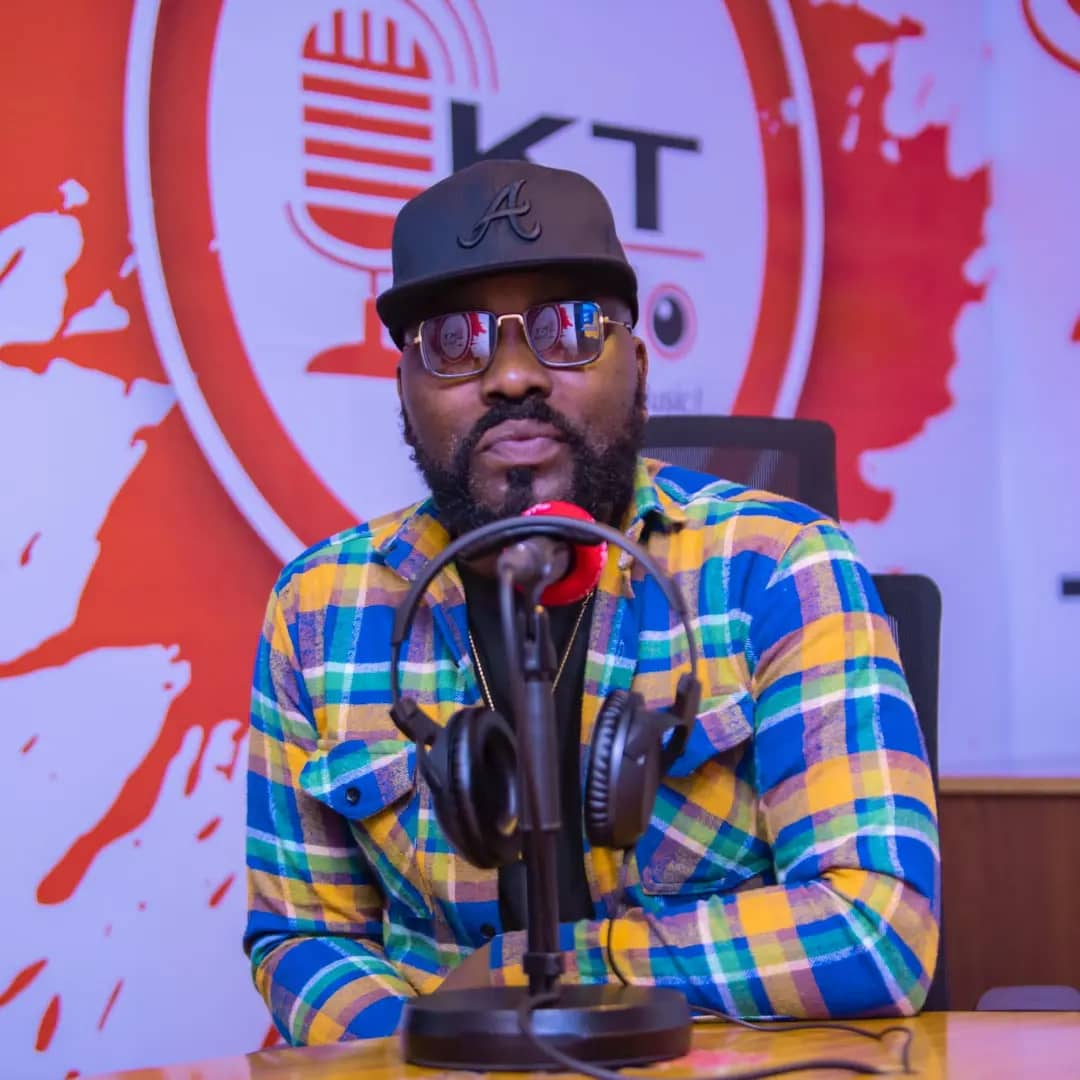
- Mc Tino in studio of Kigali Today
- Born: Kasirye Martin; November 28, 1984 (age 41); Jinja, Uganda
- Other name: Tino Berbatov
- Occupations: Artist, Journalist, Mc, Disk Jockey
- Years active: 2005-present
- Website: https://tiktok.com/@mc_tino_

Signature
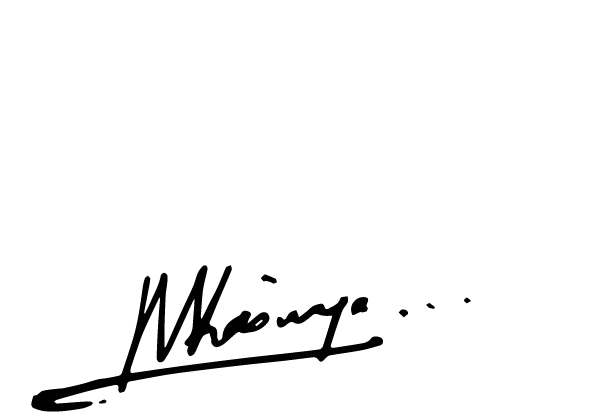

Kasirye Martin, commonly known as Mc Tino (also known as Tino Berbatov) born in November 28, 1984 (age 41) in Jinja, Uganda to Baramaze John and Veronique Tebasurwa) is a Rwandan recording artist, Radio host, MC and Deejay. He used to emcee different music festivals include Primus Guma Guma Super Star.

== Music career ==
Mc Tino released his first album, Umurima, in 2018 that has popular songs like Umurima, Njyewe Nawe, and MULA.

Mc Tino was the lead singer of TBB music trio which consisted of three members: Tino, Bob and Benja. They separated after Primus Guma Guma Superstar season 6 and he started a solo career.

== Broadcasting ==
He currently does a talk show called DUNDA Show on Magic FM. He has hosted Sharif Uzabumwana, Tito Kimenyi and Kataleya and Kandle, on the radio show.

== Emceeing ==
He used to emcee different music festivals including Primus Guma Guma Super Star. He was the MC in all the big concerts that happened in Rwanda, among them are prepared by MTN Rwanda.
