= Kiran Sethi =

Indian police officer

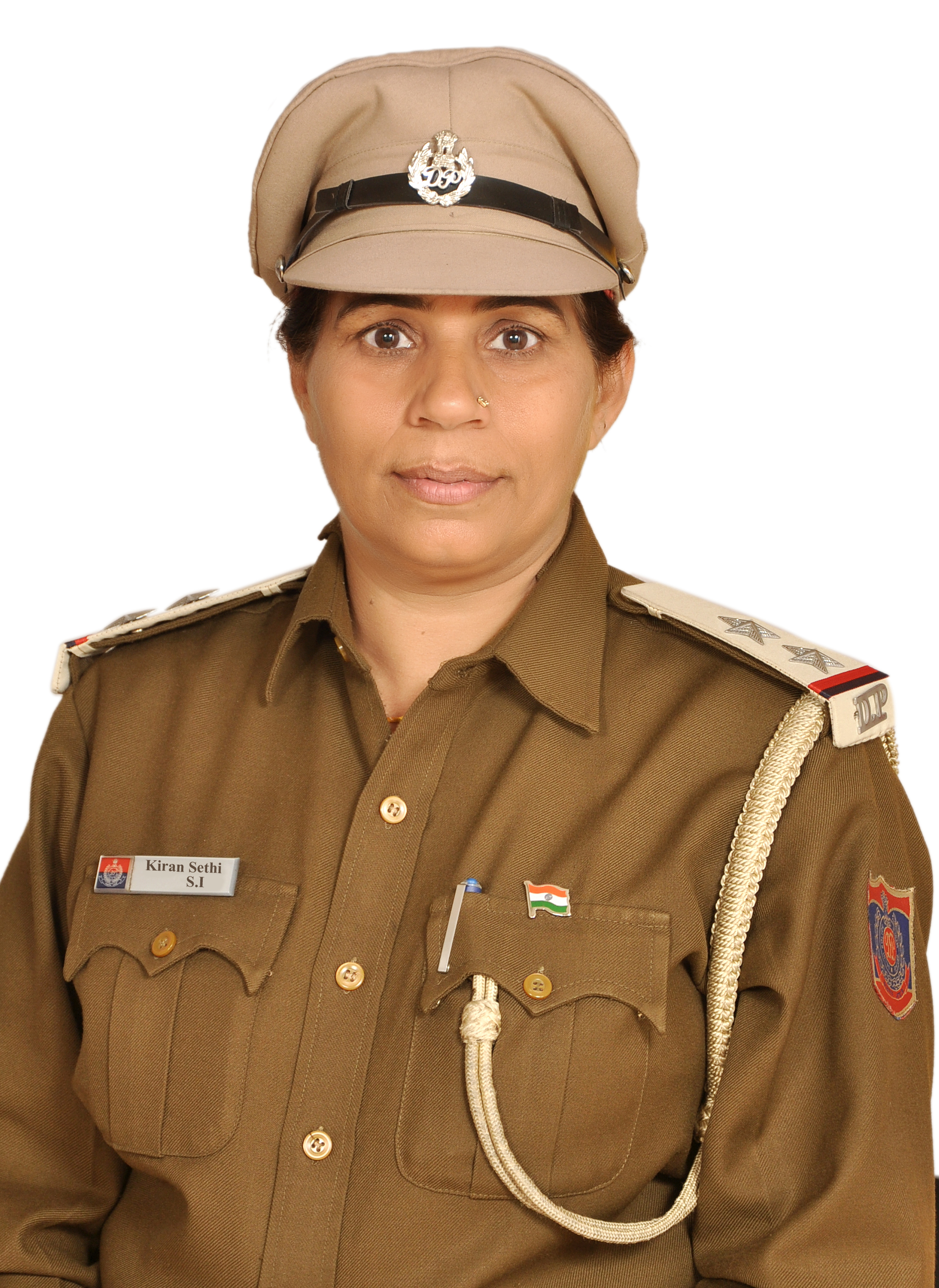
- Born: Singham Kiran Sethi; 1968 (age 57–58)
- Occupation: Police officer
- Years active: 1987–present

Kiran Sethi is a police officer in Delhi, India, known for organizing women's self-defense and police services training camps throughout India, for which she was honored by Union Home Minister Rajnath Singh in 2015.

== Biography ==
Kiran Sethi's family comes from Delhi. She studied journalism at the Indian Institute of Mass Communication before joining the police in 1987. She holds the rank of Sub-Inspector of police (SI), and often investigates cases of sexual assault and child sexual abuse. She is a chief trainer in the self-defence course 'Prahar', which by 2015, had trained more than 5,000 school and university students. She has also trained more than 200 hearing and sight impaired students in self-defence. Organising the largest demonstration of self-defence by school students resulted in her name being entered into the Limca Book of Records. In 2014, while off-duty, Sethi saved a blind girl from being kidnapped and assaulted by a drunken man.

== Martial arts achievements ==
- Black belt from the World Karate Organization in 1999
- Winner of National Competition by Taekwondo Federation of India in 2000
- Represented India in 15th World Cup in 2006
