= Satyendra Murli =

Indian journalist

- Born: 14 February 1983 (age 43); Jaipur, Rajasthan, India
- Education: Indian Institute of Mass Communication (IIMC), Ministry of I&B, New Delhi; Gautam Buddha University, Greater Noida; University of Rajasthan, Jaipur; JNV, Dausa, Rajasthan.
- Spouse: Ruchi
- Children: Manan, and Manvik

Satyendra Murli (born 14 February 1983) is a media pedagogue, researcher, and journalist in India. He has been associated with Doordarshan (DD News), (public service broadcaster of India, Prasar Bharti, government of India) as an Indian television journalist; and other several media organizations. He teaches at Delhi University as a professor of media studies. His research areas are media pedagogy, media education, media studies, mass communication, journalism, media socialisation, educational media, ethics, Buddhism; and open and distance learning.

Murli follows the ideology of Buddha and he is popularly known as an Ambedkarite journalist. He has been actively participating in social and political movements based on Phule-Ambedkar ideology for a long time, more than two decades. He strengthens the voice for human rights, freedom of speech, women rights, rights of tribals and dalits (indigenous people), diversity in media, representation of other backward classes (OBC) and religious minority.

== Early life and education ==
Satyendra Murli was born in the Jatav family to Sushila Devi Yadav and Santoshi Ram Jatav in Birana, Dausa (Rajasthan), India. His grandfather was Shri Murli Ram Jatav, a farmer and a social leader.

Murli did his schooling at the Jawahar Navodaya Vidyalaya (JNV), Dausa; Shanti Niketan School, Mahwa and GSSS, Bhilwara with science subjects. After graduating with a Bachelor of Arts degree in public administration, geography and Hindi literature from the University of Rajasthan (Jaipur); he completed his Master of Journalism and Mass Communication from the Centre for Mass Communication (Jaipur). He did PG diploma from Indian Institute of Mass Communication, Ministry for I & B (New Delhi). Murli did his M.Phil. research degree on Buddhist ethics from Gautam Buddha University, Greater Noida, Uttarpradesh. He has done PhD on media pedagogy from IGNOU.

== Family and personal life ==
Murli has two brothers and two sisters. Both his brothers are B.Tech. graduates from Indian Institute of Technology (IIT); elder brother is a political leader and younger brother is an IES officer. His father is a tax consultant; and mother is a meditation guru who earlier was a political leader and has contested Dausa district council election. Murli's maternal grandfather Shri Mohan Lal Yadav was a social leader; and maternal great-grandfather Shri Bhoop Singh Yadav was a congress leader and chairman of municipality of Hindaun city. Murli married to Ruchi Nimbe, on the occasion of birth anniversary of Satguru Ravidas Maharaj on 22 February 2016.

== Voice against casteism ==
Murli spoke of double standards in the media. He argues, "If journalists from so-called lower caste or Dalit community raise their voice against casteism, they are accused of being casteist and the ones actually perpetuating this casteism actually become national journalists". He strongly urged journalists to stand together on issues of casteism and reservation.

== Controversies ==
Murli was criticised for raising issues relating to women, and had only shared a cartoon showing Mahatma Gandhi with a few women in the month of June 2012 on his Facebook account, but soon a case was lodged against him under various sections charging him of insulting the Father of the Nation. He raised women issues, he wrote a comment under the cartoon, ‘Are Indian women not awaken this much that they could raise voice against exploitation'.

Soon, Congress led Rajasthan state government committee lodged a case (dated 6 June 2012) under sections 67, 67 A of IT Act, 4 and 6 of Indecent Representative of Women (Prohibition) Act and 292 of Indian Penal Code against Murli. He sent a clarification to the police. However, the police raided his house. In his absence, they tortured his family persons and took his bike.

On 24 November 2016, Murli, claimed that the Prime Minister’s ‘live’ address had actually been pre-recorded and edited. At a press conference held at the Press Club of India in New Delhi, Murli alleged that Narendra Modi misled the citizens of the country by recording the announcement and took a unilateral decision to demonetise notes, which made up over 85 per cent in circulation. He has filed an RTI requesting this information be made public.

According to Murli, Modi's 8 November address was not live, but recorded and edited. It had been written many days before the RBI's proposal (not decision), on the subject at 6 p.m. of 8 November and the briefing of the Cabinet by Modi at 7 p.m. Modi's address was broadcast at 8:15 p.m. with a live band, to create the impression that the decision had been taken suddenly, and the public would believe that the matter had been kept fully secret, but it was certainly not so. Whether the Government of India rules under Transaction of Business Rules, 1961 and the RBI Act, 1934, have been followed, is a moot question.

== See also ==
- Jatav
- Chamar
