= Jajati Karan =

Jajati Karan (born 22 April 1973) is a senior journalist from Odisha, India. He is the state Bureau Chief of CNN-News18. He has been chosen for ‘RNTC international scholarship for investigative journalism course’ by the Netherlands government. Karan won Ramnath Goenka national award in 2014 for his investigative journalism in the Odisha mining scam. He has done many exclusive stories on various scams in Odisha.

== Early life ==
Karan is a native of Rajkanika block in Kendrapara district of Odisha. He attended the Indian Institute of Mass Communication (IIMC), (Class of 1997) · New Delhi, India.

He went to Andrews High School, Class of 1989 Kolkata and India St. John the Baptist High School (St. Louis, Missouri) Mumbai, India. He earned a post graduate degree in English Literature (Class of 1996) at Ravenshaw College, Cuttack, Orissa. Karan completed his journalism course from Indian Institute of Mass Communication in Dhenkanal.

== Career ==
He was appointed Chief of Bureau of Odisha CNN-News18 in 2005. In his career expanding over two decades, Karan has covered several impactful investigative stories in the national media. Karan is a senior correspondent, Odisha, with CNN-IBN.

== Awards ==
Karan received several awards:

- RNTC international scholarship
- Ramnath Goenka national award (2014)
- Chevening Scholarship (2007)

 Contact No- 9437015089
