= Meena Kotwal =

Indian journalist

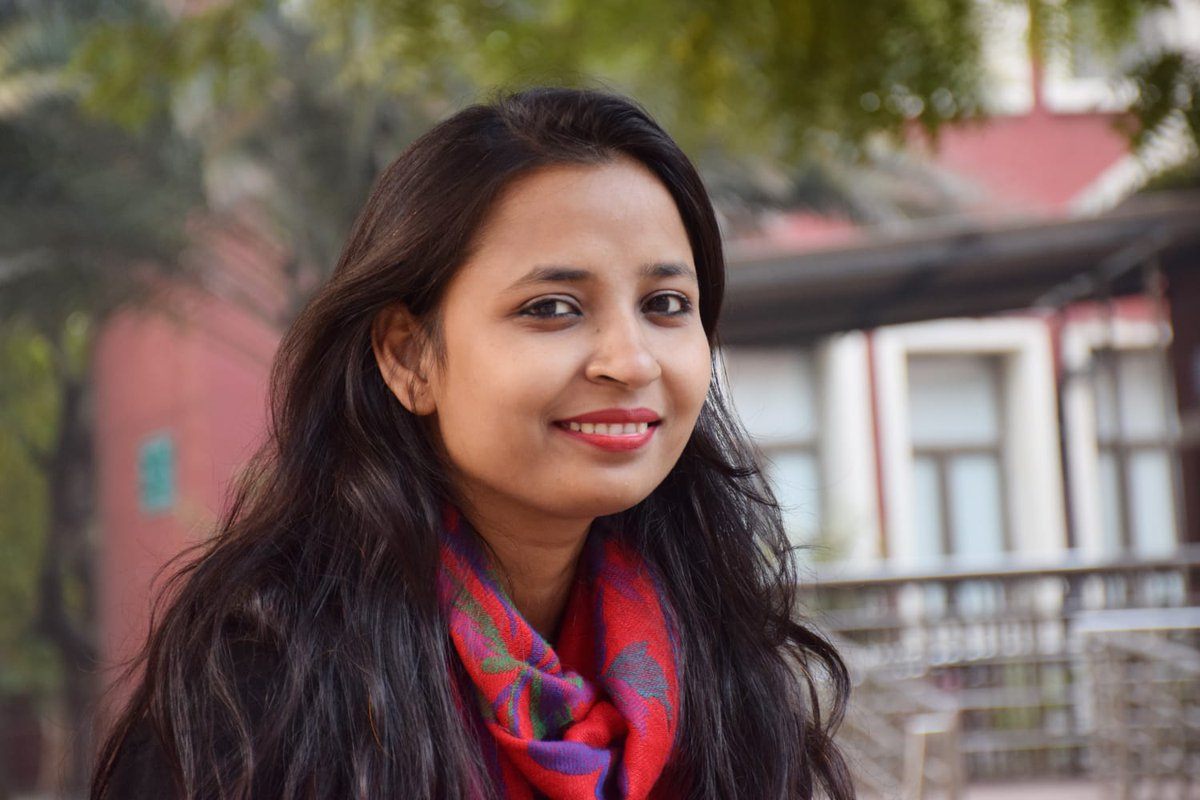
- Born: Uttar Pradesh, India
- Education: Indian Institute of Mass Communication (2013-14 batch); Jamia Millia Islamia; Babasaheb Bhimrao Ambedkar University
- Occupation: Journalist
- Years active: 2015–present
- Notable work: the founder of ‘The Mooknayak’

Meena Kotwal is an Indian journalist, and the founder of The Mooknayak, an online news channel and website focused on social justice for the Dalit, minority and marginalised people.

== Biography ==
Meena was raised in a Dalit neighborhood in New Delhi. Her parents earned little from their work as laborers. Meena attended the Indian Institute of Mass Communication, Delhi (2013-14 batch) and studied radio and television journalism. She also attended Jamia Millia Islamia (JMI), Delhi, and Babasaheb Bhimrao Ambedkar University.

Meena had worked as a broadcast journalist at the Hindi language division of the British Broadcasting Corporation (BBC) in New Delhi, India from September 2017 to July 2019. She has said her BBC contract was not renewed after she was outed as Dalit by a colleague and then experienced discrimination, and had her formal complaint denied as lacking "merit or substance" by the BBC.

She also contributes opinion pieces for The Wire, The Print, The Shudra, Youth Ki Awaz and Feminism in India. Her open letter to popular Indian actress Kangana Ranaut was published by The Wire, and the republished in Indian languages and Nepali. She has also worked for National Dastak, an online platform which focuses on the stories of marginalised identities.

On 25 December 2021, she posted an online video of herself burning the Manusmriti. She then began to receive death threats and rape threats, and the Delhi Police registed a FIR about the threats. In January 2022, she explained her reasoning for burning the Manusmriti: "The Manusmriti contains a lot of anti-women and anti-Dalit content. Babasaheb Ambedkar had also burned the Manusmriti, on 25 December 1927. Since then, Ambedkarites have been observing the day as Manusmriti Dahan Divas." In February 2022, the UN Special Rapporteur on Human Rights Defenders and others at the UN wrote to the Indian government to express concern about the threats directed at Kotwal.

She founded The Mooknayak in 2021, and by 2023, employs 10 journalists. She has described it as "a Dalit-centred newsroom." The stories published in The Mooknayak cover issues concerning Dalits and other marginalized groups in India. By March 2023, the related YouTube channel for the online newspaper had 50,000 subscribers.

== Honours and awards ==
- 2020 Indian Institute of Mass Communication Alumni Association (IIMCAA) Award for Developmental Reporting
- 2020 Indian Institute of Mass Communication Alumni Association (IIMCAA) Award for Investigative Reporting

== Personal life ==
Meena resides in New Delhi and has a daughter. She is married to Raja Pandey.
