= Sonal Kalra =

Indian journalist and writer

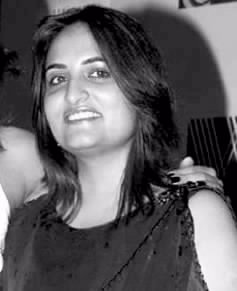
- Born: India
- Occupations: Journalist, Author

Sonal Kalra is a journalist and author in India, presently with the Hindustan Times.

== Career ==
Kalra, as chief managing editor, heads Entertainment, Art and Lifestyle for 28 nationwide editions of the publication's daily supplements HT City. Winner of the Ramnath Goenka Award for journalism, Kalra also writes a weekly column, "A Calmer You", in HT City, published since 2008, and has turned into three books - A Calmer You, More of a Calmer You, and Some More of a Calmer You. A features-writer and journalist, Kalra has previously edited a tech magazine and contributed to lifestyle publications on decor, health, wellness, fashion, food, beauty and fitness and travel, and was the content lead for the government of India web portals under Ministry of Information Technology for over a decade.

She is the co-author of another book E-Government Toolkit for Developing Countries published by the United Nations. A paper written by her on India.gov.in: India's answer to single entry portals was presented and published at the International Conference on Digital Government Research 2008, Montreal, Canada.

== Awards and achievements ==
Kalra is a gold medalist from the Indian Institute of Mass Communication, New Delhi and recipient of awards including the Ramnath Goenka award as Best Film Journalist, Dr APJ Abdul Kalam Award for contribution to journalism, United Nations Cultural Relations Media Award 2015, Excellence in Journalism award 2010 and 2012 from international think tank GPS. She received the Media Leader of the Decade - Features award 2016. Kalra's other honours include the Luxury League Award, Public Relations Society of India award, Best Content award for National Portal by Government of India 2005 and Manthan Award for exemplary content practices 2007.

In September 2011, she was awarded the Dr Sarvapalli Radhakrishnan Rashtriya Samman 2011 for contribution to media. She received the Young Achievers Award 2011 for excellence in media from the communications academy Whistling Woods International.

In January 2012, Kalra was given the Ramnath Goenka Award for Excellence in Film Journalism. The award is the highest honour for journalists in India and includes a citation and Rs 100,000 as prize money. The award was presented by the Vice President of India at a ceremony on 16 January 2012.

Her works include the HT Power Couples series where she interviewed the five most powerful couples of Indian film industry in their homes. The couples included Amitabh Bachchan and Jaya Bachchan, Akshay Kumar and Twinkle Khanna, Shah Rukh Khan and Gauri Khan, Saif Ali Khan and Kareena Kapoor and Abhishek Bachchan and Aishwarya Rai.
