= LAUNCH (Innovation Challenge) =

LAUNCH is a program sponsored by NASA, Nike, US Agency for International Development, and the US Department of State that seeks sustainable innovations through quasi-annual challenges, forums, and a business accelerator. The program began in 2010 and has since focused on themes such as energy, health, water, and waste solutions.

== History ==
=== 2010: LAUNCH Water and LAUNCH Health ===
Launch was founded in 2010 by NASA, Nike, USAID, and the US Department of State. The inaugural event, LAUNCH: Water, was held at the NASA Kennedy Space Station in March 2010 and highlighted innovations and research related to water sustainability. Some of the innovations included bacterial water sensing, a floating contaminant sensor network, and evaporation-based underground irrigation technology.

The second LAUNCH forum, LAUNCH: Health, took place in October of that same year, also at the Kennedy Space Center. This challenge highlighted innovations in optimal nutrition (access, choice, and quality of nutritious food and required nutrients), primary preventive health care, and ways to improve fitness and lifestyle choices.

=== 2011: LAUNCH Energy ===
The LAUNCH: Energy forum took place in November 2011 at the Kennedy Space Center and highlighted innovations in sustainable energy systems. The forum featured innovations in fuel cell technology, electricity management, and clean cookstoves.

=== 2012: LAUNCH Beyond Waste ===
LAUNCH Beyond waste took place in 2012 at NASA's Jet Propulsion Laboratory in Pasadena, California. This cycle highlighted nine innovations in the fields of waste-to-energy, ‘eWaste’, ‘upcycling’ and recycling, agricultural waste and conservation, medical waste, sustainable chemicals and materials, and improved sanitation. The forum also included sessions about how to accelerate these innovations towards real-world implementation.

In 2012, LAUNCH: Health Innovator Samuel Sia's company OPKO Health was awarded a contract to implement their diagnostic platform on the international space station. Numerous LAUNCH: Beyond Waste innovators were recognized for their projects in the fall of 2012. Joseph Aramburu was named one of Forbes 30 under 30 Social Entrepreneurs for project re:char and Ashnu Gupta was named India's Social Entrepreneur of the Year by the World Economic Forum for his company Goonj.

=== 2013: LAUNCH Systems and Micro-Challenge ===
In May 2013 LAUNCH convened first the LAUNCH 2020 Summit in Beaverton Oregon, a two-day event showcasing unique approaches to sustainability challenges with over 150 companies, NGOs, academics, and manufacturers in attendance. The summit also unveiled the LAUNCH 2013 Challenge Statement.

LAUNCH: Systems Forum will take place in September 2013 at the Jet Propulsion Lab and will have a focus on transforming fabrics manufacturing to increase equity and sustainability. In 2013 LAUNCH also accepted submissions for its first 'micro-challenge,' directed at student researchers and entrepreneurs. The Micro-Challenge has a focus on capturing data from the materials supply chain and using it to better understand the materials system. In 2013 LAUNCH was highlighted by Harvard's Ash Center for Democratic Governance and Innovation as one of the 'Top 25 Innovators in Government' putting it in contention for the Ford Foundation's 'Innovators In Government' Award unveiled in the fall of 2013. In May 2013, LAUNCH alumnus SEaB Energy won the Resource Revolution Award in the Category 'Energy from Waste.'

== List of Innovators ==
Innovator	Year	Forum	Project name
Susan Addy	2010	Water	ElectroChemical Arsenic Remediation
Ron Garan	2010	Water	Manna Energy Limited
Julien Harou	2010	Water	HydroPlatform
Shahram Javey	2010	Water	The Barnacle
Stephen Kennedy Smith	2010	Water	Large-Scale Vertical Hydroponic Ag System
April Rinne	2010	Water	WaterCredit
Mark Sobsey	2010	Water	Low-Cost Bacterial Water Tests
Andrew Tinka	2010	Water	Floating Sensor Network
Mark Tonken	2010	Water	Subsurface Vapor Transfer Irrigation
Mark van Iersel	2010	Water	Affordable Soil Moisture Sensors
Jonathan Attwood	2010	Health	Zamzee
Dieterich Lawson	2010	Health	Medic Mobile
Aydogan Ozcan	2010	Health	LUCAS
Ramesh Raskar	2010	Health	NETRA
Ben Reis	2010	Health	HealthySocial / Food Hero
Matt Sanders	2010	Health	iMetrikus MediCompass Connect
Samuel Sia	2010	Health	mChip
Erick Toledo	2010	Health	The Chlorine Bank
Gijsbert van de Wijdeven	2010	Health	Bioneedle Technologies Group
David Van Sickle	2010	Health	Asthmapolis
Mark Bryant	2011	Energy	Thermofluidics
Sorin Grama	2011	Energy	Promethean Power Systems
Burt Hammer	2011	Energy	Hydrovolts
Craig Jacobson	2011	Energy	Point Source Power
Yashraj Khaitan	2011	Energy	Smart DC Microgrids
Nina Marsalek	2011	Energy	Solanterns Initiative
Ashutosh Misra	2011	Energy	ITN Energy Systems
Jamie Simon	2011	Energy	Powerzoa
Rene Nunez Suarez	2011	Energy	Turbococina
Frank Wang	2011	Energy	NanoTune Technologies
Jason Aramburu	2012	Beyond Waste	re:char
Joseph Atnafu	2012	Beyond Waste	Sanergy
Lisa Dyson	2012	Beyond Waste	Kiverdi
Brooke Farrell	2012	Beyond Waste	RecycleMatch
Nitin Gupta	2012	Beyond Waste	Attero Recycling
Anshu Gupta	2012	Beyond Waste	Goonj
Sandra Sassow	2012	Beyond Waste	SEaB Energy
Jeff Toolan	2012	Beyond Waste	Pylantis
Kiah Williams	2012	Beyond Waste	SIRUM
Mark Browne	2013	Systems	Benign by Design
Rana Gupta	2013	Systems	Geckskin
Sam Harrington	2013	Systems	Mushroom Materials
Oliver Heintz	2013	Systems	Bark Cloth
Suzanne Lee	2013	Systems	Biocouture
Jay Nalbach	2013	Systems	CRAiLAR
Felix Puller	2013	Systems	Qmilk
Candice Reffe	2013	Systems	Blue Flower Initiative
Akshay Sethi	2013	Systems	Ambercycle Recycling
Tara Sutherland	2013	Systems	CSIRO (Artificial Honey Bee Silks)
