= Mitali Mukherjee (journalist) =

Indian journalist

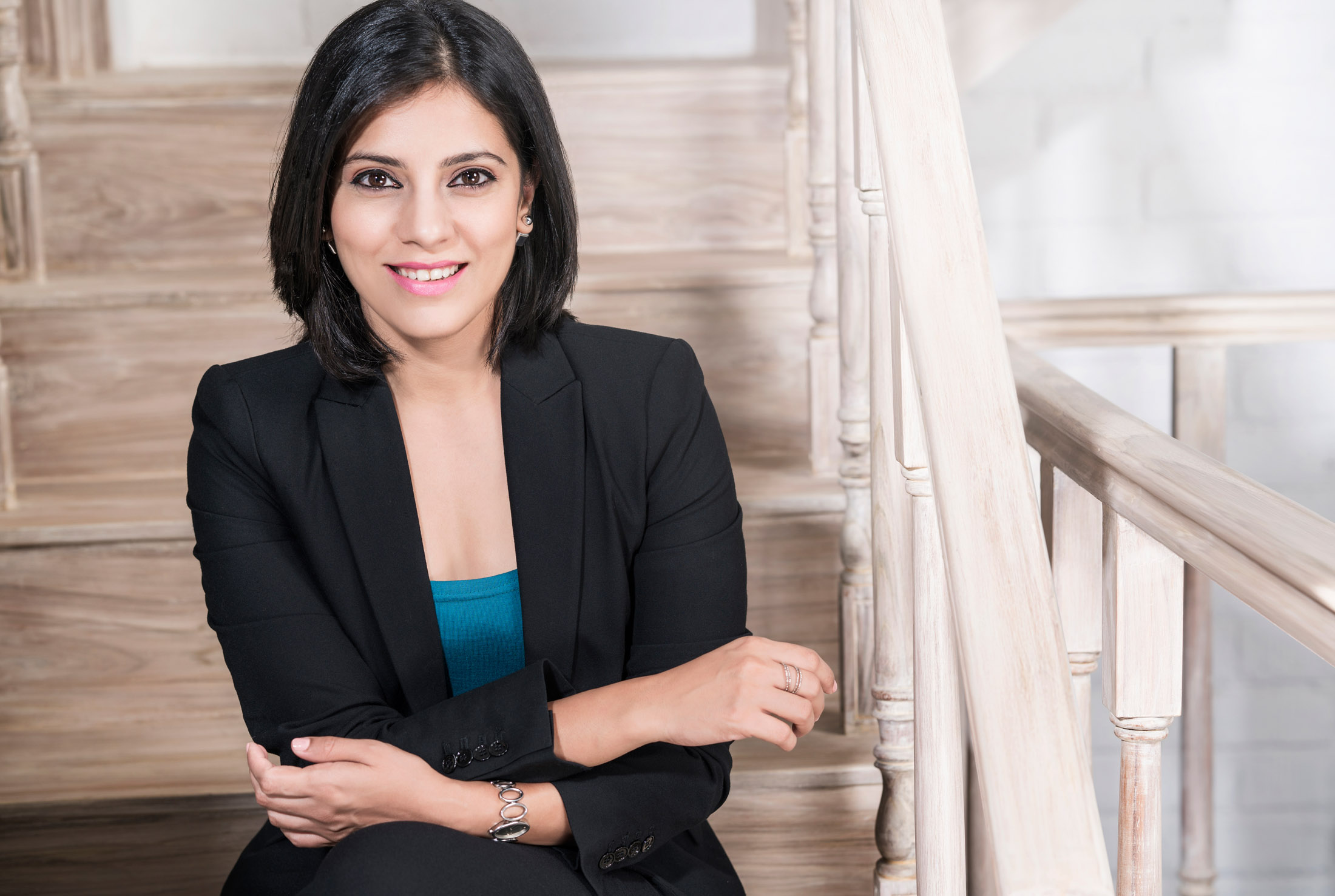
- Mitali Mukherjee (Business Journalist)
- Born: 6 December 1979 (age 46); Ambala, Haryana, India
- Education: IIMC
- Occupation: Journalist
- Years active: 2000–present
- Website: mitalimukherjee.com

Mitali Mukherjee (born 6 December 1979) is an Indian news anchor and financial journalist. She is currently the Director of the Reuters Institute for the Study of Journalism and its Director of Journalist Programmes.

She was news editor and key anchor of CNBC TV18. She was previously with The TV Today group, BBC World and Doordarshan. She has also consulted with Mint, the World Bank and The Indian Express. as well as The Wire.

== Early life ==
Mitali was born in Ambala, Haryana. She attended The Army Public School in New Delhi. She then graduated in Political Science Honours from Delhi University and was awarded a gold medal. Post-graduation, Mitali went to Indian Institute of Mass Communication (IIMC) under the Ministry of I&B where she specialised in TV and Broadcast Journalism.

== Career ==
From 2004, Mitali was Markets and News Editor at CNBC TV18, where she anchored the flagship show, Bazaar, Business Lunch and Closing Bell. She resigned in 2014.

In 2016, she co-founded MoneyMile a digital video platform where her core focus was sharing financial investing advise to help women become financially independent and empowered.

Mitali has been Consulting Business Editor at The Wire, a left-leaning anti-establishment portal in India.

In 2022 Mukherjee joined the Reuters Institute for the Study of Journalism as head of Journalist Programmes. She was named the institute's Acting Director in 2024, following the departure of previous director Rasmus Kleis Nielsen. In 2025, she was appointed Director of the institute.

== Reception ==
=== Awards and Achievements ===
Mitali has been a vocal supporter of financial freedom for women. She has spoken at many gatherings on gender equity. Mitali is a Chevening fellow for the South Asia Journalism Fellowship 202. She is also a TEDx speaker, Raisina AFGG (Asian Forum for Global Governance) Young Fellow and Steering Committee member of AIYD (Australia India Youth Dialogue). Also Get International Award Dr M A Wazed Miah International Gold Medal

=== Book ===
Mukherjee wrote a book titled Crypto Crimes in 2024 which was published by Harper Collins. While reviewing her book for News18, columnist Harshil Mehta observed that the book "gives a feel of a reporter’s diary or some journalistic assignment. Many stories could have been kept short, and others presented in a more engaging manner. The author’s lack of deep expertise is evident in the frequent reliance on quotes and news reports, even for basic information, which disrupts the flow of the narrative."
