= Garima Sanjay =

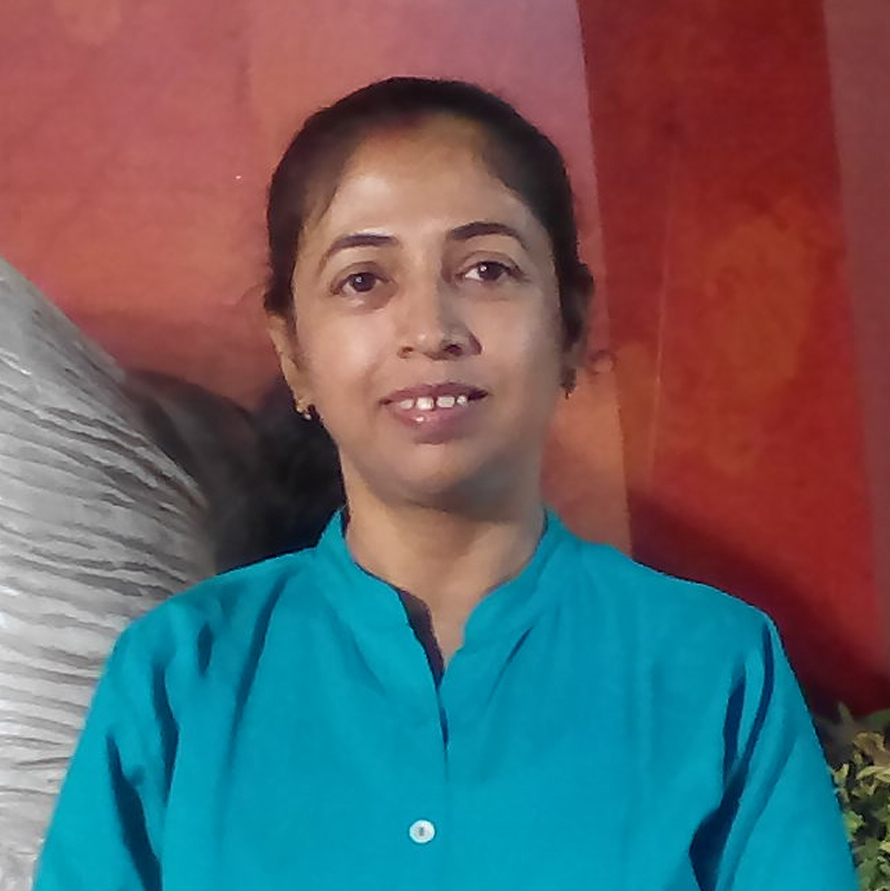
- Sanjay in 2015
- Born: Allahabad, Uttar Pradesh, India
- Education: Allahabad University
- Occupation: Author
- Spouse: Sanjay Kumar
- Children: Shatrrundam Srivastav

Garima Sanjay (born on 15 January, in Allahabad) is an author of novels and short stories, as well as a scriptwriter and documentary film producer.

== Early life and education ==
Born in Allahabad (Uttar Pradesh), Sanjay did her schooling from St. Anthony's Convent Girls' Intermediate College. She did her graduation from Allahabad University in Economics and Post Graduation in Ancient History and Culture.

== Career ==
Sanjay has been working in the Indian media industry for over two decades. Presently, she is serving the digital museum and experience industry, where she contributes by making strategies as well as, conducting research, curation, and writing narratives on literary, historical, and cultural subjects. Her field of expertise spans from Bharatiya philosophy and spirituality to technology and general awareness. She has written numerous books on various topics.

Sanjay has made various documentary and short films for both government agencies and for private companies. She is a curator and content developer for museums too. Among many museums in her credit, she has also worked for the Pradhanmantri Sangrahalaya, New Delhi, which was launched by the Prime Minister of India, Shri Narendra Modi on 14 April 2022. She also conceptualised and curated a digital exhibition on the occasion of the 17th Pravasi Bharatiya Divas on the theme of "Contribution of Diaspora in the Indian Freedom Struggle". The exhibition was inaugurated by the Hon. Prime Minister of India, Shri Narendra Modi. EAM Shri S. Jai Shankar, Minister of Culture, Smt. Meenakshi Lekhi, and the Chief Minister of Madhya Pradesh, Shri Shivraj Singh Chauhan, were also present on the occasion.

Currently working in the field of historical and cultural research, she is an expert in museum curation and strategising engaging experiences. As a storyteller, she creates experiences that are interesting and engaging, as well as informative and enlightening. An MA in Ancient History and Culture, after completing her Post Graduation in mass media studies from Indian Institute Of Mass Communication, she joined the media industry. Her professional career in the field of writing started more than twenty years back in New Delhi.

Sanjay is currently doing research, curation and preparing narratives for various museums and other informative experience centres of the Government of India. A few in the list include: The Pradhanmantri Sangrahalaya, NMML, New Delhi and "Azadi Ka Amrit Mahotsav - Contribution of Diaspora in Indian Freedom Struggle" for the 17th Pravaasi Bharatiya Divas, held in Indore, Madhya Pradesh (Ref: https://pib.gov.in/PressReleasePage.aspx?PRID=1889739 Her most notable literary works are Hindi novels 'Smritiyan' (2013), 'Aatank Ke Saaye Mein' (2015) and 'Khatte Mithe Se Rishte' (2019). She has been regularly contributing on social and environmental issues in various magazines, newspapers and news-portals.

Sanjay’s short stories have been published in magazines like Jagran Sakhi, Sahitya Amrit, Laghukatha.com, Dharohar, Yuva Pravartak etc. & features in Dainik Jagaran, Punjab Kesari, Rashtriya Sahara, SirfNews.com etc. She's contributed in providing Hindi content for four new museums sanctioned by the Government of India. Three museums for the Ministry of Culture "Yaaden Jalliyan" and "Shraddhanjali" established at Red Fort, Delhi and "Icons of Nationalism" at National Library, Kolkata and one for the Ministry of Textiles. The museums at Red Fort were inaugurated by PM Sri Narendra Modi on the birth anniversary of Netaji Subhash Chandra Bose, on 23 January 2019.

In documentary film making her highly appreciated works are "GLOF" (Glacial Lake Outburst Flood) for UNDP, "Madan Lal Dhingra" for Films Division of India and "Bhartiya Police- Saahas Yeh Bhi" for BPR&D under the guidance of Dr Kiran Bedi.

== Literary works ==
=== Novels ===
1. Smritiyaan (2013)
2. Atank Ke Saaye Mein (2015)
3. Khatte Meethe Se Rishtey (2019)
4. Khwahishen Apni-APni (2020)

=== Short stories ===
1. Jharokhe (2025), is a collection of short stories

=== General books ===
1. Start up India- Shuru Karein Apna Karobar (2016)
2. Constitution of India (A textbook on Indian Polity)
3. Acupressure (Hindi & English)
4. Aroma Therapy
5. "1001 Tips for Good Health"
6. Miniature book series on 12- Zodiac signs
7. Family Homeopathy Handbook

=== Translations ===
1. PM Narendra Modi : The Game Changer
2. 'My Father Sarat Chandra Bose' by Sisir Chandra Bose
3. '"Reflections of a Surgeon" by Dr. V. N. Srikhande
4. CSAT book, Computer text books and other text books for Tata McGraw Hills
5. Hindi content for various educational software for Multivarsity, Pune
6. Science and Social Sciences text books for NCERT
7. 'India Educator' a house journal of Discovery Channel
8. ‘EXPORT MANAGEMENT’, a text book of IIFT, by Prof.B. Bhattacharya
9. Various books on Alternative Therapies, viz. Juice & Fruit therapies, Reiki, Aroma Therapy, an encyclopedia of Acupressure, etc.
