= Haroon Habib =

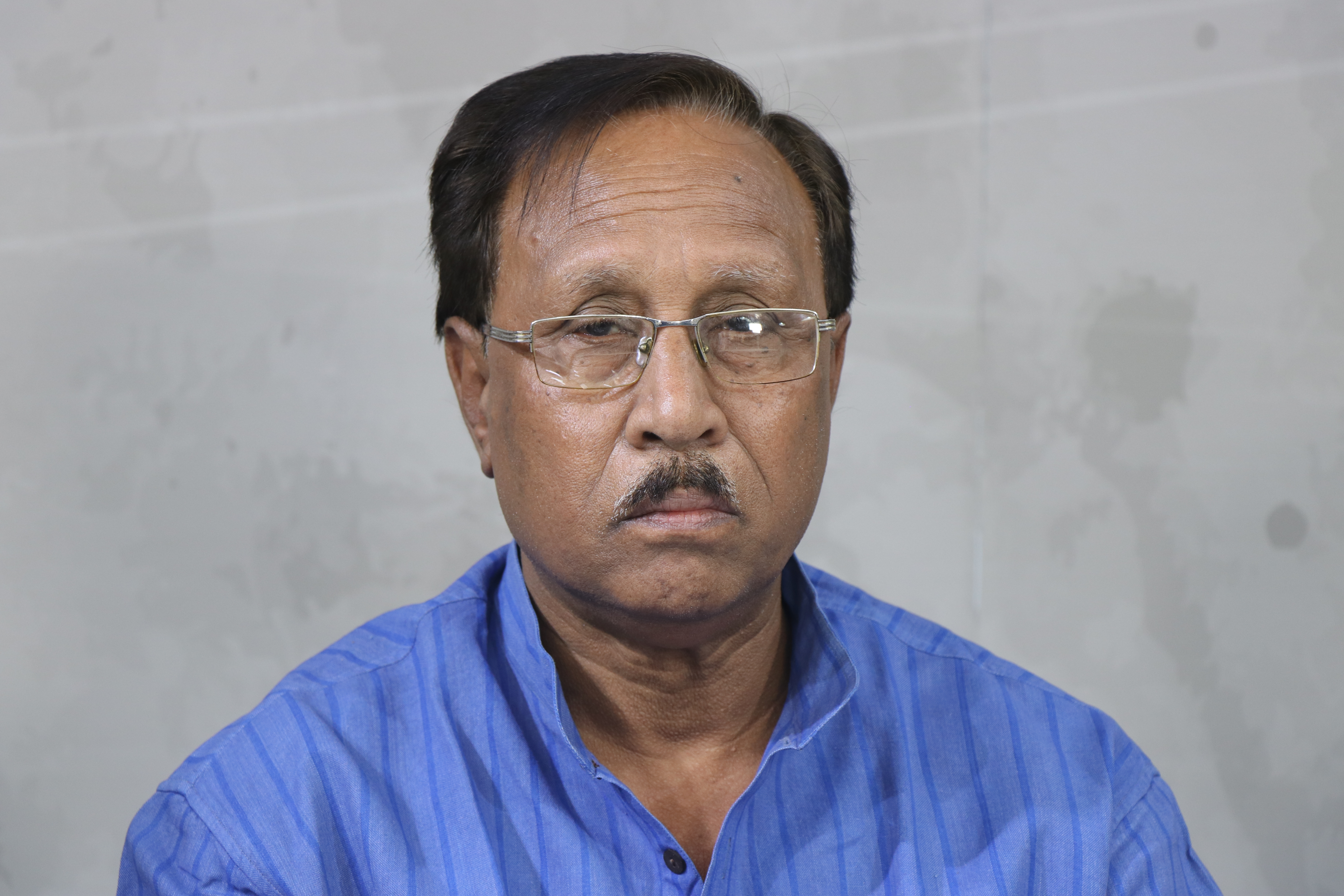
- Habib in 2018
- Born: 1 January 1948; Dewanganj, Jamalpur, Bangladesh
- Citizenship: Bangladeshi
- Education: University of Dhaka (M.A.)
- Occupations: Writer, journalist, columnist
- Writing career
- Language: Bengali, English

Haroon Habib (Bengali: হারুন হাবীব; born 1 January 1948) is a writer, journalist and columnist of Bangladesh who is well known for his bold independent writings. A powerful voice in journalism, creative writings and social activism for last three and half decades, he took part in the country's Liberation War in 1971 as a student guerrilla fighter and simultaneously worked as war correspondent of the Joy Bangla weekly and Swadhin Bangla Beter Kendra radio, the two official mouthpieces of the provisional Mujibnagar government, that led the country's independence war.

== Early life ==
Habib, the only son of the middle class Bengali Muslim parents, was born 1 January 1948 at Dewanganj in Jamalpur, a northern Bangladesh district. He obtained early education from local Dewangonj Co-operative High School and Aseque Mahmud College, Jamalpur, and got his master's degree in Journalism from the University of Dhaka in 1974. He did post-graduate study at the Indian Institute of Mass Communication (IIMC), New Delhi.

== Career ==
Habib is one of the few freedom fighters who joined journalism returning from the warfronts in early 1972 soon after the devastating war that turned the former eastern wing of Pakistan as Bangladesh. He first joined as a reporter in the Bangladesh Press International (BPI), a smaller news agency that began operation after the new country was born, and later joined Bangladesh Sangbad Sangstha (BSS), the premier national news agency, run by the state.

Spanning over three decades, he served the wire service in various journalistic capacities and finally led the national news agency as its editor-in-chief and managing director. Habib is also the Dhaka correspondent of India's prestigious English daily The Hindu and Frontline magazine for over two decades. He contributed to TIME as the magazine's stringer based in Dhaka, and worked for nearly 10 years as Bangladesh correspondent of the Bengali Service of the German radio – Deutsche Welle. A popular columnist, he writes regular columns in the leading Bangladesh and regional newspapers. He now leads Journalism & Peace Foundation (JPF), an organisation he founded for making journalism peace oriented.

== Literary work ==
A well-known short story writer, novelist and essayist, Habib authored many books, some of them are highly rated. His major literary works is primarily set on the theme of nation's struggle for secular identity and the events of the War of Liberation, in which 3 million people were killed and over three hundred thousand women raped by marauding Pakistan army and their local Islamist goons. For outstanding contribution to literature, he got 'Bangla Academy Literary Award' for 2013 and the 'Katha Sahitya Kendra Award', among others.

== Social activism ==
A leading civil society proponent, Habib is closely involved in social activism, particularly in the secular 'Pro-Liberation' campaign that he feels urgently to protect Bangladesh from the clutch of fanaticism and Islamist militancy. He is one of the leading voices in Bangladesh for the trial of the 'War Criminals' who perpetrated worst crimes against unarmed civilians as cohorts of the marauding Pakistan army during the nation's Liberation War in 1971. Currently, he is leading the Sector Commanders' Forum (SCF), a national platform of 1971 war veterans, for restoration of the country's secular identity and hold trial of the War Criminals as the forum's secretary general.

== Family ==
A permanent resident in Dhaka, Habib is married to Asma Parveen Rochi and they have two children: a daughter and a son - Tanvir Habib Shuvo. He has two sisters: Ferdowsy Kawser and G F Nurunnessa Shaheen.

== Major works ==
=== Novels and short stories ===
Name	Description	Language
Sonali Eagle -O- Udbastu Shomoy : সোনালী ইগল ও উদ্বাস্তু সময়	an autobiographical novel on the Bangladesh Liberation War of 1971	Bengali
Choto Golpo Samagra 1971 : ছোটগল্প সমগ্র ১৯৭১	short story collection	Bengali
Bidrohi –O- Apon Padabali : বিদ্রোহী ও আপন পদাবলী	short story collection	Bengali
Lal Shirt –O- Pitripurus : লাল শার্ট ও পিতৃপুরুষ	short story collection	Bengali
Muktijuddho : Nirbachito Golpo : মুক্তিযুদ্ধ : নির্বাচিত গল্প	selected short stories of Bangladesh Liberation War 1971	Bengali
Sarnapakkha Eagle : স্বর্ণপক্ষ ইগল	short story collection	Bengali
Prio Juddha Priotamo : প্রিয় যুদ্ধ প্রিয়তম	novel	Bengali
Panch Purush : পাঁচ পুরুষ	novel	Bengali
Ganplo Saptak : গল্পসপ্তক	short story collection	Bengali
Andho Lathial : অন্ধ লাঠিয়াল	short story collection	Bengali
Antoshila : অন্তশিলা	novel	Bengali
Nirbasita Niharbanu : নির্বাসিতা নীহারবানু	novel	Bengali

=== Essays, reviews and memoirs ===
Name	Description	Language
Muktijuddho Palabodoler Itihas : মুক্তিযুদ্ধ : পালাবদলের ইতিহাস	a collection of essays and columns	Bengali
Muktijuddha –Dateline Agartala : মুক্তিযুদ্ধ : ডেটলাইন আগরতলা	a book on contribution of Tripura, a tiny Indian state, in Bangladesh Liberation War	Bengali
Muktijuddho Bijoy –O- Berthota : মুক্তিযুদ্ধ : বিজয় ও ব্যর্থতা	a collection of essays and memoirs	Bengali
Janajuddher Upakkhan : জনযুদ্ধের উপাখ্যান	a memoir of Bangladesh Liberation War	Bengali
Prottokkhodorsir Chukhe Muktijuddho : প্রত্যক্ষদর্শীর চোখে মুক্তিযুদ্ধ	an eye witness reports of Bangladesh Liberation War	Bengali
Muktijuddher Nirbachito Probondho : মুক্তিযুদ্ধের নির্বাচিত প্রবন্ধ	a collection of essays on Bangladesh Liberation War	Bengali
Juddhaporadhider Bichar –O- Prasongik Probondho : যুদ্ধাপরাধীদের বিচার ও প্রাসঙ্গিক প্রবন্ধ	a collection of essays	Bengali
Bangladesh Blood and Brutality ISBN 9789847390116	a collection of Pakistani genocide and rape	English
Bangladesh Genocide 1971	a compilation of major reports on Pakistani genocide and rape	English
Looking Beyond Boundaries; India-Bangladesh Relations: War Crimes trial and Islamist Militancy	a volume of essays and commentaries	English

=== Plays and documentation ===
Name	Description	Language
Agrajjho Dandatsob	play	Bengali
Poster Ekattur	play	Bengali
Ekatturer Jatree	an album of rare front line photographs of 1971 War snapped by Haroon Habib	Bengali
