= Mandeep Punia =

Indian journalist

Mandeep Punia is a freelance journalist based in Haryana. He was arrested by Delhi Police during 2020–2021 Indian farmers' protest, India. He was sent to Tihar Jail for 14 day. Indian journalists protested against Punia's arrest in the front of Delhi Police headquarter.

== Early life and education ==
Punia's home town is Jhajjar, Haryana. He done his graduation from Panjab University, Chandigarh. He studied journalism from Indian Institute of Mass Communication (IIMC) during 2017-18. A 30 minutes long show on Al Jazeera has shown his work in Farmers protest.
