= Anshu Gupta =

Indian social entrepreneur

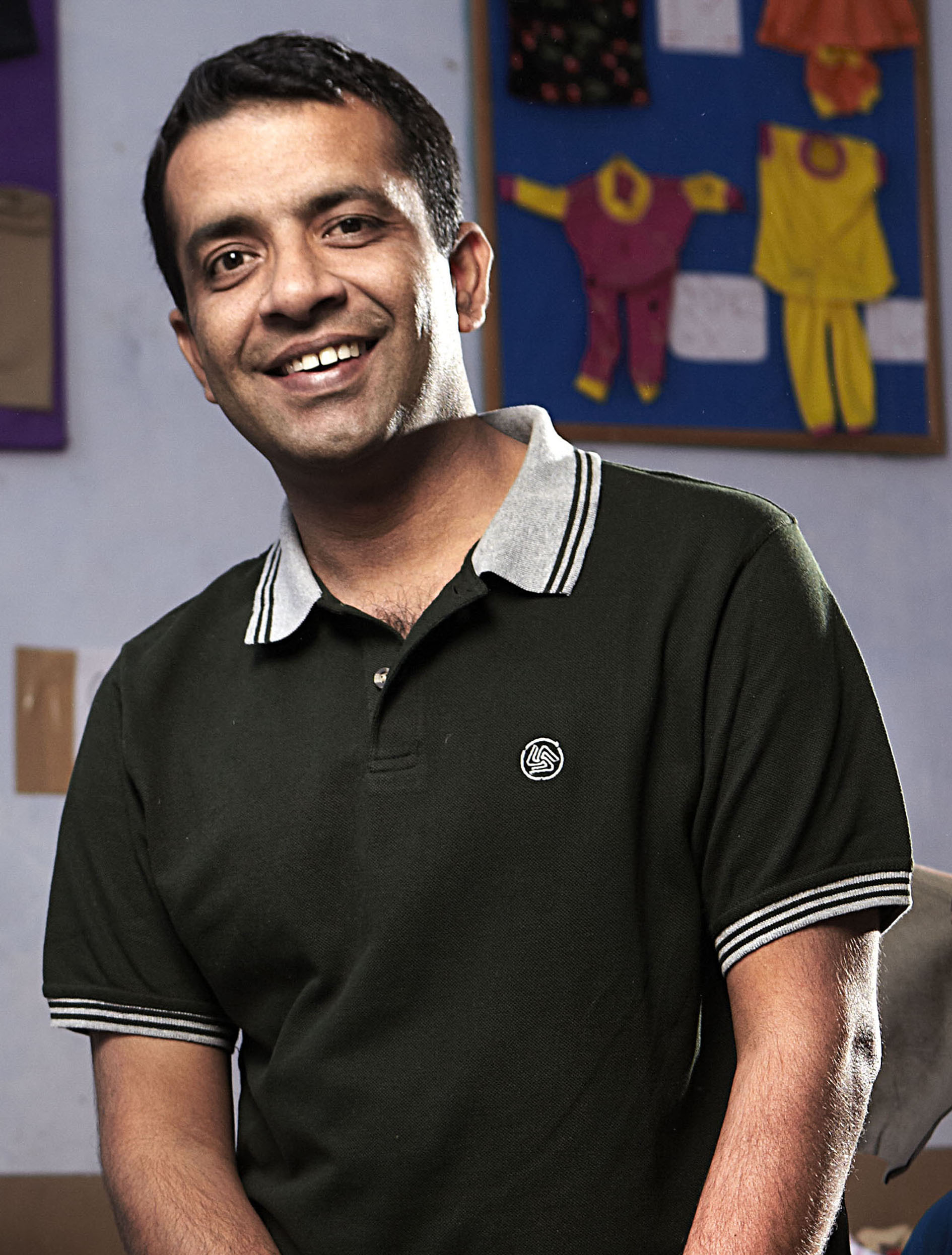
- Born: Meerut
- Education: Indian Institute of Mass Communication
- Occupations: Founder Director, Goonj
- Known for: Founder and director of Goonj and Gram Swabhimaan
- Awards: Ramon Magsaysay Award 2015; Ashoka Fellowship 2004; Social Entrepreneur of the Year Award 2012

Anshu Gupta is an Indian entrepreneur and founder of Goonj, a non-governmental organization based in Delhi. Goonj transfers urban material, particularly cloth, with rural villages, undertaking disaster relief, rural community development and humanitarian aid in parts of 23 states in India. Through Goonj, Gupta built a barter system between rural communities and urban surplus material, transferring material resources like clothing, utensils, food grains as compensation for labour- digging wells, building schools within the community, repairing roads and general community development. Gupta has been recognized by the Ramon Magsaysay foundation for his "creative vision in transforming the culture of giving in India".

== Career ==
Gupta worked as a freelance journalist after completing his schooling, writing about history, monuments and humanitarian issues. He was a copywriter at Chaitra followed by Power Grid Corporation, and then Escorts Communication.

=== Goonj ===
In 1999, he started Goonj with his wife, Meenakshi, to work on rural aid using the barter of clothing and other material resources for labour and community development. Beginning with 67 pieces of cloth collected in Sarita Vihar, the organization expanded operation across 28 states and 4000 villages, employing over 1000 workers as of 2022.

=== Cloth for Work ===
Under Goonj's initiative 'Cloth for Work', village communities across India work on their issues and get urban material for their efforts. Cloth for Work and other Goonj initiatives have received various national and international recognition. Goonj also provides aid to victims of natural disasters such as floods and earthquakes.

Anshu Gupta has been called by media as The Clothing Man of India for establishing clothing as an important developmental work.

In "Cloth for Work", communities have built bamboo bridges, dug up wells, done bunding of acres of land, developed small irrigation canals, have built drainage systems, built village schools, repaired roads, and developed water harvesting systems to clean up water bodies. The organization emphasizes the importance of self-reliance in a community.

=== School to School ===
Goonj's School to School initiative, launched in Coimbatore in 2010, encouraged students in cities to donate school materials to have them redistributed to rural schools.

=== Not Just a Piece of Cloth ===
Gupta initiated the "Not Just a Piece of Cloth" campaign following the 2004 Indian Ocean tsunami. The initiative was started after Gupta observed over 100 truckloads worth of cloth, deemed unwearable, be discarded as waste. The material was recycled into reusable cotton cloth. In the absence of affordable health and hygiene products, unhygienic alternatives like sand, ash or rags are employed with no real alternatives. The initiative aims to help women with the risk of infection and the social stigma against periods.

=== Rahat ===
An earthquake in Uttarkashi triggered Gupta's involvement with disaster relief and rehabilitation. For nearly two decades, he has been working on disasters from earthquakes to tsunamis, cyclones, and floods. Goonj's initiative "Rahat" evolved into an active network of stakeholders in rural and urban India, ensuring timely response for generating need-based disaster relief and rehabilitation efforts.

== Recognition ==
- Ramon Magsaysay Award
- Ashoka and Schwab Fellowship
- CNN IBN Real Heroes award in the women welfare segment
- Social Entrepreneur of the Year Award by Schwab Foundation for Social Entrepreneurship
- Forbes magazine listed Gupta as one of India's most powerful rural entrepreneurs
- Curry stone design prize
- AIMA (All India Management Association) Award
- Marico Innovation Award
