= Sitaram Agrahari =

Nepali journalist

- Born: 1957 (age 68–69); Duhabi, Nepal
- Education: Indian Institute of Mass Communication, Thomson Foundation
- Occupations: Journalist, Writer, Poet

Sitaram Agrahari (born c.1957) is a Nepalese journalist, poet and editor-in-chief of Gorkhapatra, Nepal's oldest daily newspaper. He received Rajarshi Janak Award in 2011 for his contribution in Hindi poetry and fiction.

== Early life and education ==
Sitaram Agrahari was born in 1957 in Duhabi of Sunsari district in Nepal. He did his Bachelor of Arts (honours), M.A in Hindi, M.A in political science (village profile due) and received Diploma in development journalism from Indian Institute of Mass Communication, New Delhi, India. He received journalism training from the Thomson Foundation, United Kingdom. He received Rajasthan Patrika Award (India), Rajarshi Janak literary Award(Nepal). He worked as UNESCO Media coordinator, Nepal, and executive member of Transparency International, Nepal

== Career ==
He was thrice editor-in-chief of Gorkhapatra Daily, the oldest daily in Nepal, twice Managing Editor of The Gorkhapatra Daily, published by Gorkhapatra corporation . Also he was the General Manager of Gorkhapatra corporation. He is founder president of Sports Journalist Forum. Sitaram Agrahari formerly held the post of Editor-in-chief of Yuva Manch (monthly) and Manoram Apsara (monthly magazine).

== Books ==
- Kathadweep (1977) jointly: First story collection from Nepal in Hindi
- Jiye Swabhiman Bhi (Poetry collection, 1996)
- Tumhi Se Kahta Hu (Poetry Collection, 2011), Beej hoon Mai (2018)
