= Rasmus Kleis Nielsen =

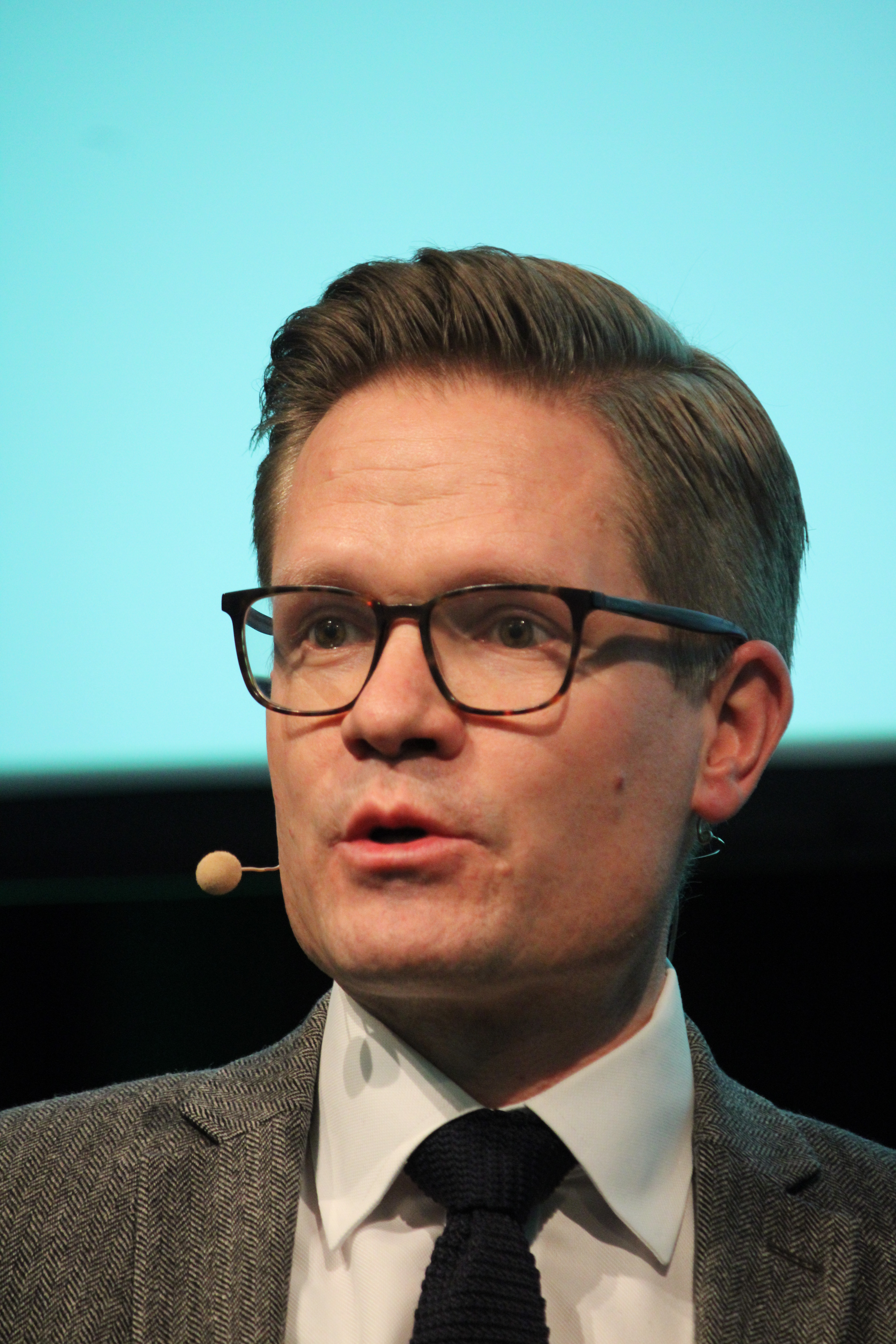
Kleis Nielsen in 2025

Rasmus Kleis Nielsen is professor of political communication and Director at the Reuters Institute for the Study of Journalism at the University of Oxford.

Nielsen earned his BA and MSc in political science at the University of Copenhagen, his MA in political theory from the University of Essex, and his PhD in communications from Columbia University.

In 2014, he won the Doris Graber Award for best book on political communication published in the last ten years, awarded by the American Political Science Association, for Ground Wars.

== Selected publications ==
- The Changing Business of Journalism and its Implications for Democracy (2010, edited with David Levy)
- Ground Wars: Personalized Communication in Political Campaigns (2012)
- Political Journalism in Transition: Western Europe in a Comparative Perspective (2014, edited with Raymond Kuhn).
