= Reuters Institute for the Study of Journalism =

UK-based research centre

Coordinates: 51.7569°N 1.2462°W

- Established: 2006; 20 years ago
- Director: Mitali Mukherjee
- Location: University of Oxford; Oxford, England, UK
- Website: reutersinstitute.politics.ox.ac.uk

The Reuters Institute for the Study of Journalism (RISJ) is a UK-based research institute and think tank founded in 2006, which operates Thomson Reuters Journalism Fellowship Programme, also known as the Reuters Fellowship. It is part of Oxford University’s Department of Politics and International Relations and affiliated with Green Templeton College.

== History ==
The institute was founded in the Department of Politics and International Relations at the University of Oxford in 2006 to conduct scholarly and professional research on news media, journalism, and the changing role of news and information in modern societies. It operates the Thomson Reuters Journalism Fellowship Programme, and host academic research fellows. The RISJ works to bridge daily working journalism and academic study. The Institute regularly holds seminars and events and has an extensive publication programme.

== Description ==
The Reuters Institute is the University of Oxford's research centre on issues affecting news media globally.

== Funding and governance ==
The Reuters Institute receives core funding from the Thomson Reuters Foundation and additional funding from media companies, foundations, and science academies worldwide.

The institute is chaired by Alan Rusbridger, former principal of Lady Margaret Hall in Oxford. Advisory board members include Indian media entrepreneur Ritu Kapur and British life peer Baroness Wheatcroft. The institute’s longtime director Rasmus Kleis Nielsen stepped down in 2024, and was succeeded by the journalist Mitali Mukherjee, who previously served as deputy and acting director and director of the Journalist Fellowship Programme.

== Publications ==
Each year, the RISJ publishes predictive reports on trends in the news industry. It also publishes an annual digital news report whose data has been referenced by journalism agencies such as PBS, NHK, Rappler, Channel NewsAsia, News24, and the Poynter Institute.
