= Brij Khandelwal =

Indian journalist

Brij Khandelwal of Agra is an Indian journalist and environmentalist.

== Early life ==
Khandelwal studied at the Indian Institute of Mass Communication in New Delhi in 1972.

== Career ==
He has worked for various newspapers and agencies including the Times of India. He worked with UNI, NPA, Gemini News London, India Abroad, Everyman's Weekly (Indian Express), PTI, and India Today. Khandelwal edited Jan Saptahik of Lohia Trust, reporter of George Fernandes's Pratipaksh, correspondent in Agra for Swatantra Bharat, Pioneer, Hindustan Times, and Dainik Bhaskar until 2004). He wrote mostly on developmental subjects and environment and edited Samiksha Bharti, and Newspress Weekly.

He authored two books on the environment, Towards New Environment and Taj Mahal in Pollution Cauldron: A Reporter's Diary.

He appeared in a National Geographic TV film on the Taj Mahal and in BBC's India on Four Wheels, and CNN's documentary on the Yamuna and the Taj Mahal.

Khandelwal was involved in saving Yamuna river in the Braj region.

He is associated with the international news agency IANS.

He taught journalism at Agra University for the Central Hindi Institute's Department of Journalism and Mass Communication for over three decades. He is on the editorial board of Vrindavan Today monthly, and Right Reason monthly.

== Activist ==
He has been associated with the Braj Mandal Heritage Conservation Society, Design for Change, Sri Nathji Nishulk Jal Sewa, and the My Clean India campaign. He worked with various human rights groups. He is the national convener of the River Connect Campaign, founded in 2014 for the rejuvenation of the Yamuna river. Khandelwal was in the news during the 2024 national elections on the issue of the Kachchativvu island, which had been gifted to Sri Lanka in 1974. Khandelwal filed a petition in the Delhi High Court in 1974 to stall the transfer of the island but the petition was dismissed.

== Personal life ==
His political stance is slightly left of centre.

Khandelwal married Padmini K Iyer, an ex-Tamil journalist. They have one daughter, Mukta.
