= Bharat Koirala =

Nepalese journalist

- Occupations: Journalist, author

Bharat Dutta Koirala is a Nepalese journalist who was the winner of the 2002 Ramon Magsaysay Award for Journalism, Literature and Creative Communication Arts. He started his career in journalism as the chief reporter of The Rising Nepal in 1965 and became editor of Gorkhapatra and executive chairman and general manager of Gorkhapatra Corporation. He is also the founder of the Nepal Press Institute, Nepal Forum for Environmental Journalist, Media Services International, and Radio Sagarmatha, the first independent private FM radio station. Awarded the Knight International Press Fellowship Award by the International Center for Journalists in Washington, D.C. and the Ramon Magsaysay Foundation in Manila, Philippines, he also pioneered the publication of a Nepalese Wall Newspaper, and is credited with introducing reporting on development of rural Nepal. He is the Secretary General of Nepal Press Institute, Chairman of Media Services International, and Chairman of Himal Association.
