= Vartika Nanda =

Indian journalist and campaigner

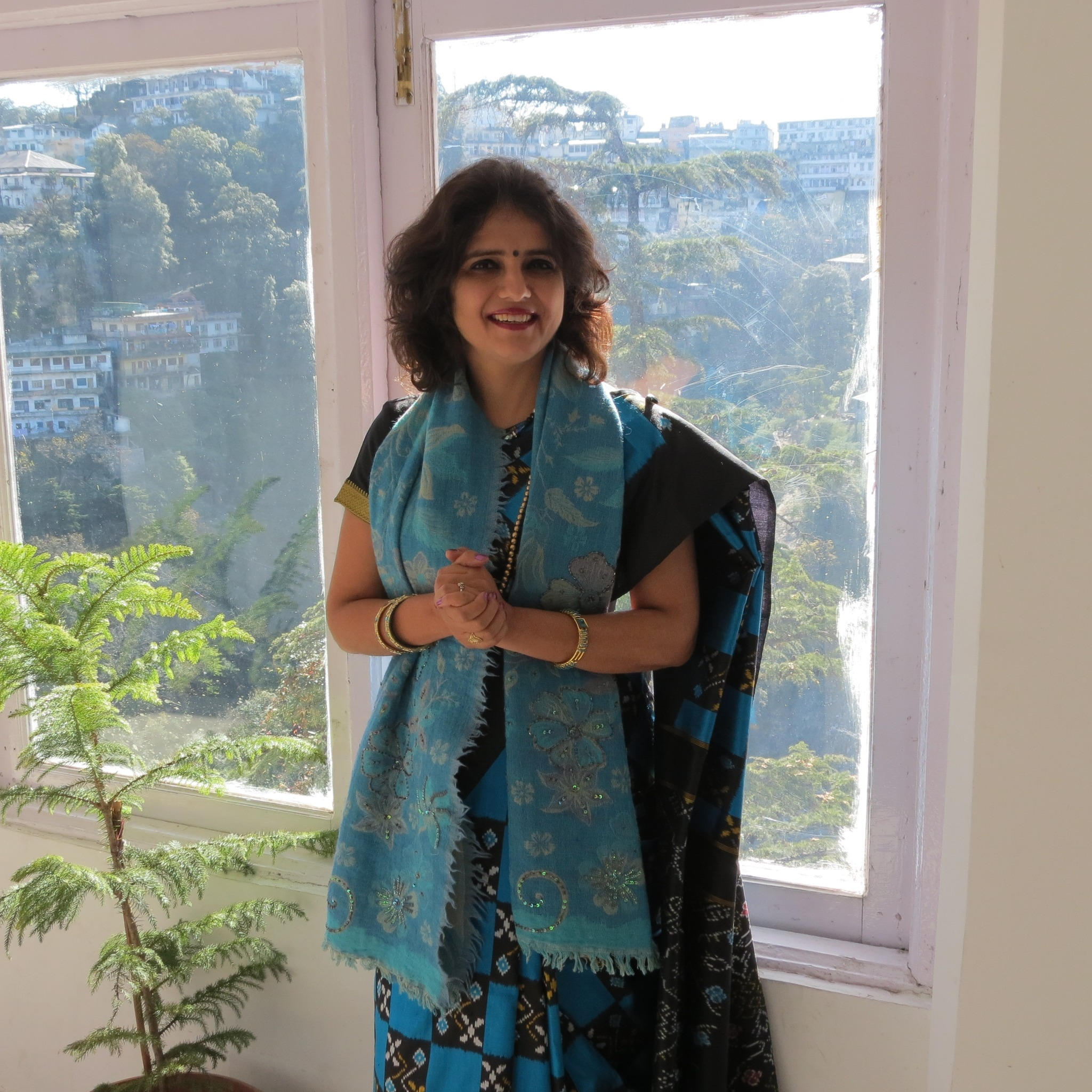
- Nanda at LBSNAA, Mussoorie in 2016
- Born: Punjab
- Occupations: Prison reformer, media educator, trainer, podcaster and author

Prof. (Dr.) Vartika Nanda is an Indian prison reformer, media educator and media commentator. She is the recipient of Stree Shakti Puraskar by the President of India, the highest civilian honour for women empowerment in India, given to her for her work in media and literature. Her name entered Limca Book of Records twice. She is the recipient of Bhartendu Harish Chandra Award by Government of India and is a TEDx speaker.

Vartika Nanda is credited for giving birth to prison radios in District Jail, Agra (Uttar Pradesh), District Jail, Dehradun (Uttarakhand) and the jails of Haryana. She has authored 4 books on prisons, including Radio in Prison published by National Book Trust in 2024. Her research on the "Study of the condition of women inmates and their children in Indian Prisons and their communication needs with special reference to Uttar Pradesh" was released by Shri Manoj Kumar Singh (IAS), Chief Secretary, Uttar Pradesh and Shri P. V. Rama Sastry, Director General of Police/Inspector General Prison, Prison Administration and Reform Services, Uttar Pradesh in 2024. Brut India has given extensive coverage to her work in the prisons of Haryana.

She is the voice of Delhi Police and is the storyteller of Kissa Khaki Ka, the only podcast series by any police department in India.

== Career ==
Vartika Nanda heads the Department of Journalism in Lady Shri Ram College, Delhi University She has held various journalistic assignments in electronic media including Zee News, NDTV and Lok Sabha TV. Her research areas include prisons, relationships between police, crime and the persecution of victims, gender reporting and the portrayal of women in media. She was the first woman reporter to head crime beat in the electronic media in India. She runs the Tinka Tinka Foundation dedicated towards prison reforms, with a special focus on prison radio. She is credited with curating and creating the concept of awards for inmates and prison staff for the first time in India. Her name has been included in the Limca Book of Records twice for her work on prison reforms.

== Published books ==
=== Journalism and mass communication ===
  - Nanda, V. (2024) Radio in Prison: National Book Trust: ISBN 978-93-5743-974-9
  - Nanda, V. (2018) Media Laws and Ethics: Kanishka Publishers: ISBN 978-81-8457-839-3
  - Nanda, V. (2018) Media aur Bazaar: Samayik Books: ISBN 978-93-80458-96-0
  - Nanda, V. (2017) Radio Journalism in India: Kanishka Publishers: ISBN 978-81-8457-798-3
  - Nanda, V. (2014) Khabar Yahan Bhi: Samyik Prakashan: 2014: ISBN 978-81-7138-286-6
  - Nanda, V. (2010) Television aur Crime Reporting: Rajkamal Prakashan: 2010: ISBN 978-81-267-1943-3
  - Nanda, V. (2005) Television aur Apraadh Patrakarita: Delhi: Indian Institute of Mass Communication. (ISBN 81-87481-03-X) Received the Bhartendu Harish Chandra Award by I&B Ministry in 2007

=== Prison reforms and mass communication ===
  - Nanda, V. (2024) Radio in Prison: National Book Trust: ISBN 978-93-5743-974-9
  - Nanda, V (2023). Tinka Tinka Tihar (Hindi): Tinka Tinka Foundation
  - Nanda, V. (2020) Tinka Tinka Dasna (Hindi): Tinka Tinka Foundation: ISBN 978-93-5265-729-2 (First ever reporting from a jail)
  - Nanda, V. (2018) Tinka Tinka Madhya Pradesh (Hindi): Tinka Tinka Foundation: ISBN 978-93-5321-015-1
  - Nanda, V. (2016) Tinka Tinka Dasna (Hindi): Tinka Tinka Foundation: ISBN 978-93-5265-729-2
  - Nanda, V. (2016) Tinka Tinka Dasna (English): Tinka Tinka Foundation: ISBN 978-93-5265-730-8 (First reporting from the jail)
  - Nanda, V. (2013) Tinka Tinka Tihar (Eds.) (Hindi): Ed: Vartika Nanda & Vimla Mehra: Publisher: Rajkamal Prakashan: 2013. Included in the Limca Book of Records.
  - Nanda, V. (2013) Tinka Tinka Tihar. Delhi: Rajkamal Prakashan: (ISBN 978-81-267-2565-6) – Included in the Limca Book of Records.

=== Literature ===
  - Nanda, V. (2026) J Se Jail: Publisher: Prabhat Prakashan: ISBN 978-93-7573-880-0
  - Nanda, V. (2015) Raniyan Sab Janti Hain: Publisher: Vani Prakashan: ISBN 978-93-5072-976-2 (selected amongst TOP 5 books by Femina)
  - Nanda, V. (2012) Thee. Hoon.. Rahungi....: Delhi: Rajkamal Prakashan: ISBN 978-81-267-2232-7. (First collection of poems in the country on the issues of crimes against women) (received Dr Radha Krishnan Memorial Award & Rituraj Parampara Samman)
  - Nanda, V. (2011) Marjani: Publisher: Rajkamal Prakashan: ISBN 978-81-267-2098-9
  - Nanda, V. (1989) Madhur Dastak

== Selected awards ==
- 2013: Stree Shakti Puraskar by the Government of India for her work on women's empowerment.
- 2015: Limca Book of Records for her book Tinka Tinka Tihar.
- 2017: Limca Book of Records for the song Tinka Tinka Tihar.
- 2022: Laadli Media Award for Tinka Jail Radio Podcast on District Jail, Karnal in Haryana
- 2023: Laadli Media Award for Tinka Jail Radio Podcast on Central Jail, Ambala in Haryana
- 2023: First Rajkumar Keswani Award for excellence in Journalism
- 2005: Bharatendu Harishchandra Award by the Government of India.
