= Tito Kimenyi =

Rwandan film producer

Kimenyi Tito (born August 10, 1999) is a Rwandan film producer, director and actor.

== Early life and education ==
Kimenyi was born in Kicukiro District in the central part of Rwanda. He was the first of four children in his family. Kimenyi grew up wanting to become an actor, but later turned into a TikToker. He obtained in 2021 a bachelor's degree in Environmental management and conservation from Kigali Independent University.

== Career ==
Kimenyi joined in 2021 and started as sculptor but started acting in 2023. He won an award for best TikTok influencer at the 2022 Tiktok Rwanda Awards. In 2023, Kimenyi Tito premiered a movie called Love Might Happen.

== Philanthropy ==
Kimenyi donates and contributed to charity organizations working in the Gisagara District. He planted trees during an event started by the minister of youth, Utumatwishima, with the aim of fighting seasonal fluctuations.
