= The Mooknayak =

Online news channel

- Available in: 2 languages
- List of languages English, Hindi
- Founded: 2021; 5 years ago
- Country of origin: India
- Founder: Meena Kotwal
- Website: www.themooknayak.com

The Mooknayak is an online news website founded in 2021 that focuses on social justice for Dalits and marginalized communities. Its name, which means 'the leader of the voiceless' honours the Mooknayak newspaper founded by Dr. Bhimrao Ambedkar in 1920 and reflects the work of its founder, Dalit journalist Meena Kotwal.

The Mooknayak covers stories related to Dalits and other marginalized groups in India. Kotwal has described it as "a Dalit-centred newsroom."

Kotwal founded the online version of The Mooknayak in 2021, and by 2023, the organization employed 15 journalists, including 9 full-time. News articles are written in English and Hindi, and journalists produce videos for the associated YouTube channel. By March 2023, the YouTube channel had 50,000 subscribers.

The Mooknayak online news outlet is crowdfunded and has received approximately $12,000 from the Google News Initiative and around $6,000 from a YouTube training program.
