= Daan Utsav =

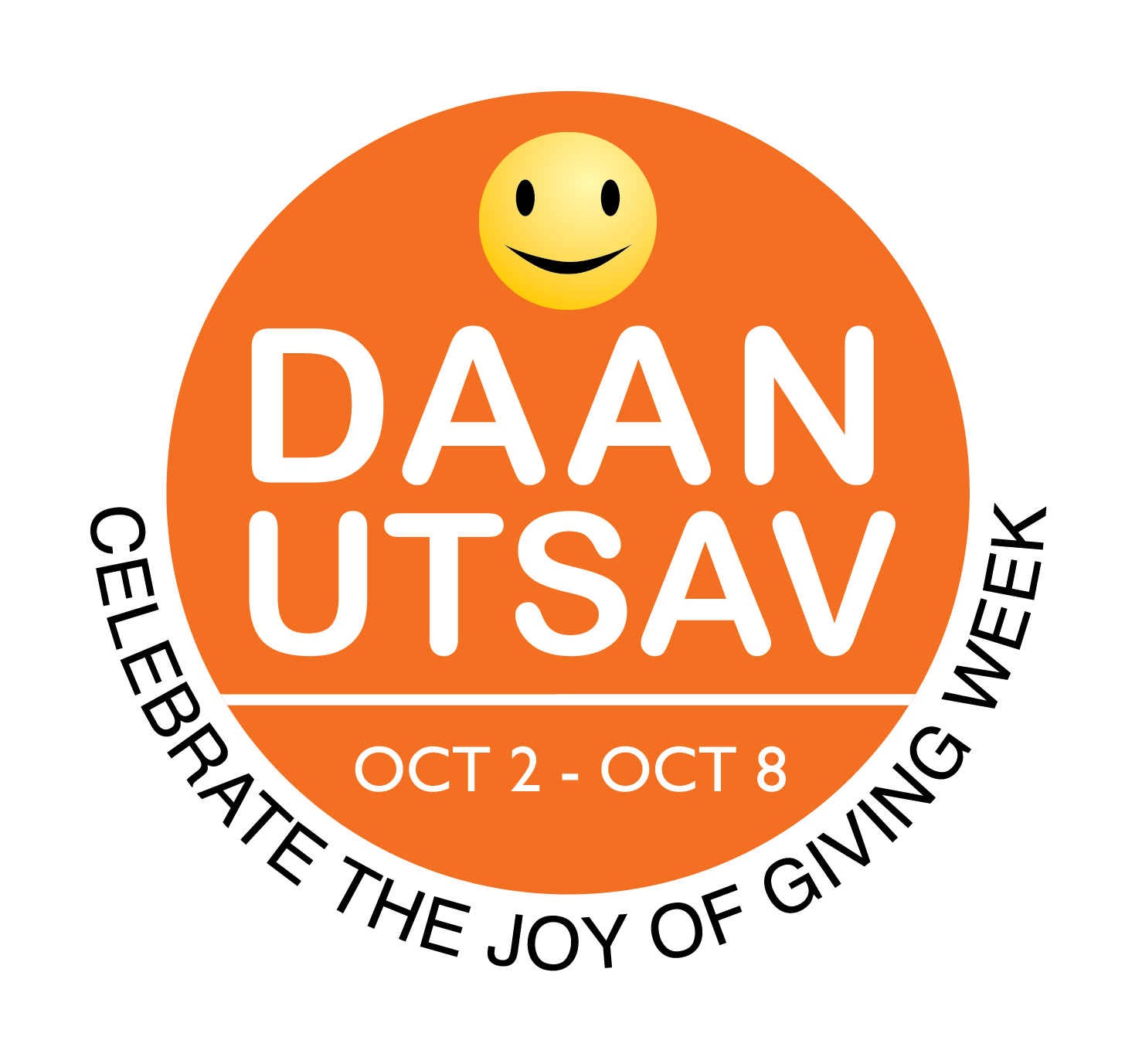
Logo of DaanUtsav- the Joy of Giving Week

Daan Utsav was formerly known as The Joy of Giving Week. The Joy of Giving Week (JGW) is celebrated every year covering Gandhi Jayanti by engaging people through "acts of giving" - money, time, resources and skills - spanning the corporate, NGO and government sectors, schools, colleges and the general public. Originally called "India Giving Week", the name "Joy of Giving Week" was made up by the ad agency, Euro RSCG India.
